= Kemecse District =

Kemecse District Kemecsei járás
- Districts of Hungary
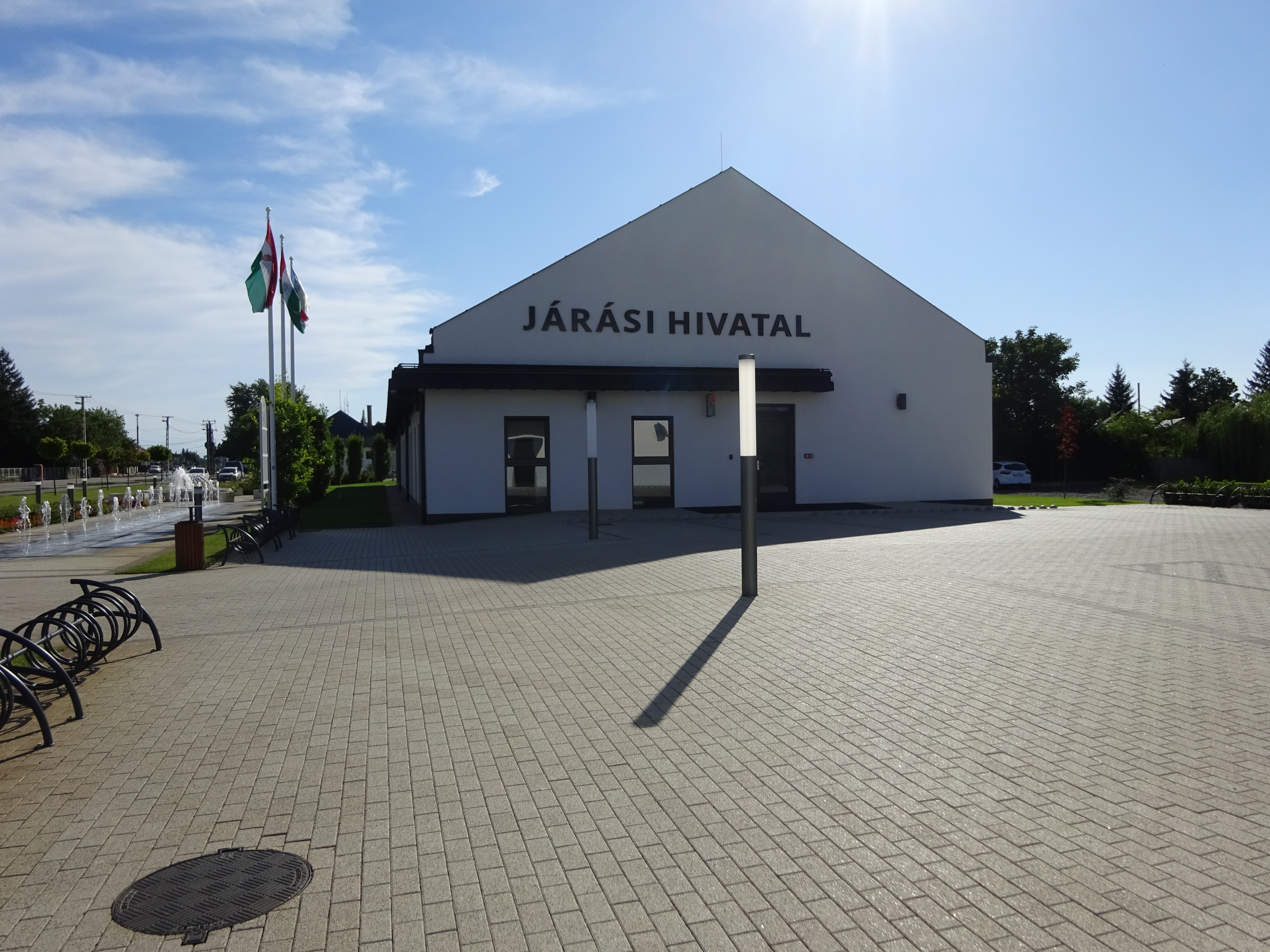

- Coat of arms

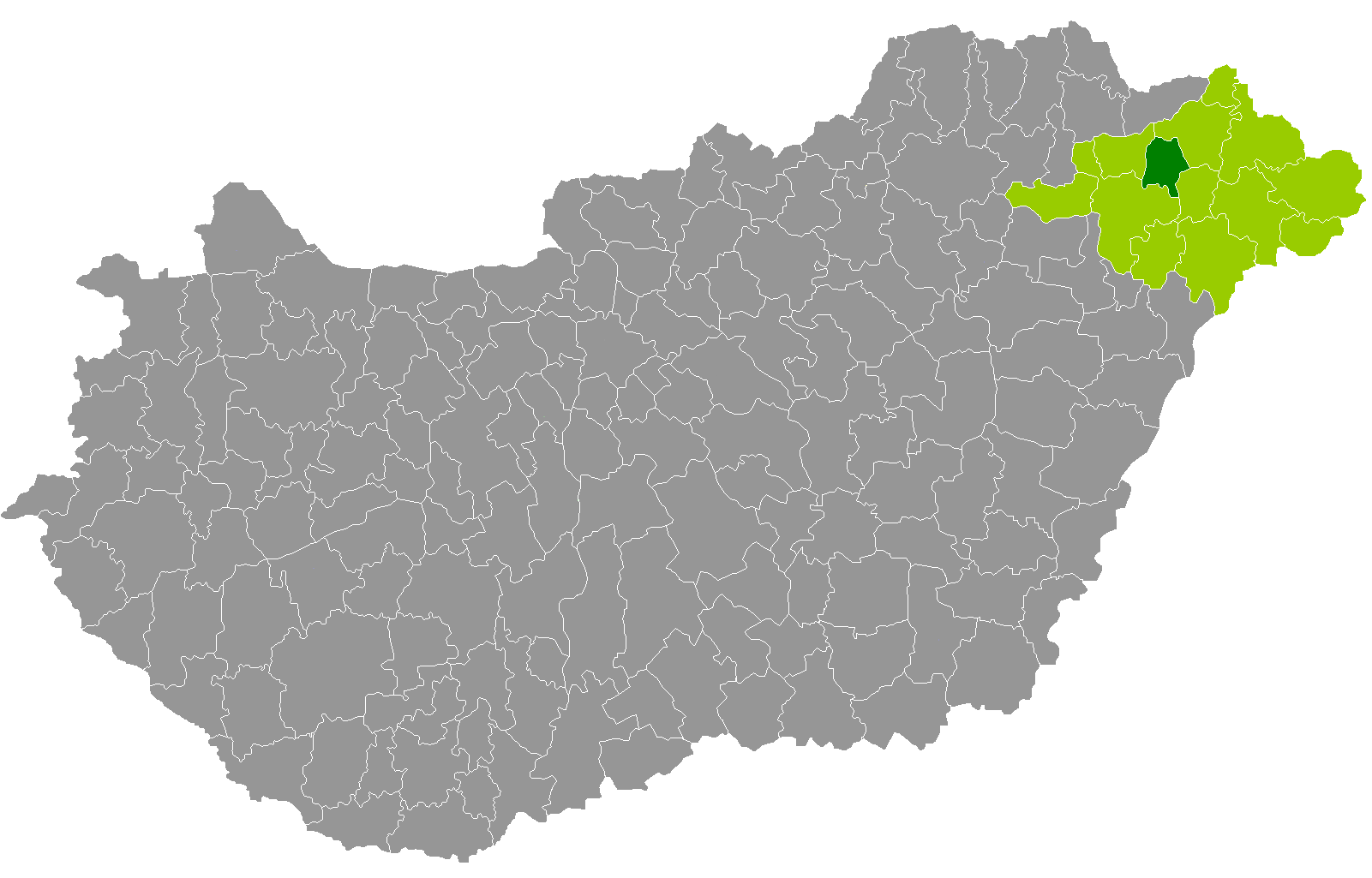
- Kemecse District within Hungary and Szabolcs-Szatmár-Bereg County.
- Coordinates: 48.07°N 21.80°E
- Country: Hungary
- County: Szabolcs-Szatmár-Bereg
- District seat: Kemecse

Area
  - Total: 246.41 km^{2} (95.14 sq mi)
  - Rank: 12th in Szabolcs-Szatmár-Bereg

Population (2011 census)
  - Total: 22,066
  - Rank: 10th in Szabolcs-Szatmár-Bereg
  - Density: 90/km^{2} (230/sq mi)

Kemecse (Hungarian: Kemecsei járás) is a district in central part of Szabolcs-Szatmár-Bereg County. Kemecse is also the name of the town where the district seat is found. The district is located in the Northern Great Plain Statistical Region. This district is a part of Rétköz geographical region.

== Geography ==
Kemecse District borders with Kisvárda District to the northeast, Baktalórántháza District to the southeast, Nyíregyháza District to the south, Ibrány District to the west. The number of the inhabited places in Kemecse District is 11.

== Municipalities ==
The district has 2 towns and 9 villages. (ordered by population, as of 1 January 2013)

- Berkesz (855)
- Beszterec (1,086)
- **Demecser** (4,284)
- Gégény (1,975)
- Kék (1,966)
- **Kemecse** (4,792) – district seat
- Nyírbogdány (2,861)
- Nyírtét (1,088)
- Székely (1,046)
- Tiszarád (568)
- Vasmegyer (1,664)

The bolded municipalities are cities.

== Demographics ==
Religion in Kemecse District (2011 census)
1. Calvinism (37.9%)
2. Lutheranism (0.40%)
3. Catholic Church (24.7%)
4. Greek Catholicism (8.10%)
5. Other religions (1.60%)
6. Non-religious (5.30%)
7. Atheists (0.20%)
8. Undeclared (21.8%)

In 2011, it had a population of 22,066 and the population density was 90/km².

Year	County population	Change
2011	22,066	n/a

=== Ethnicity ===
Besides the Hungarian majority, the main minority is the Roma (approx. 2,000).

Total population (2011 census): 22,066
Ethnic groups (2011 census): Identified themselves: 21,663 persons:

- Hungarians: 19,597 (90.46%)
- Gypsies: 1,900 (8.77%)
- Others and indefinable: 166 (0.77%)

Approx. 500 persons in Kemecse District did not declare their ethnic group at the 2011 census.

=== Religion ===
Religious adherence in the county according to 2011 census:

- Reformed – 8,356;
- Catholic – 7,241 (Roman Catholic – 5,443; Greek Catholic – 1,798);
- Evangelical – 92;
- other religions – 360;
- Non-religious – 1,175;
- Atheism – 55;
- Undeclared – 4,787.

== Gallery ==
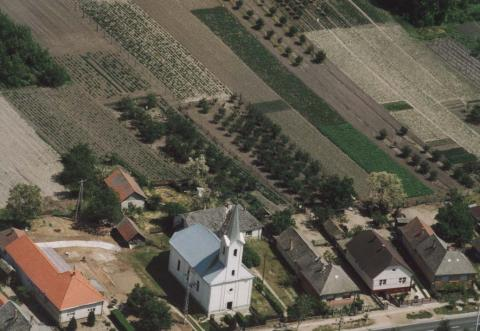
Aerial view of Berkesz

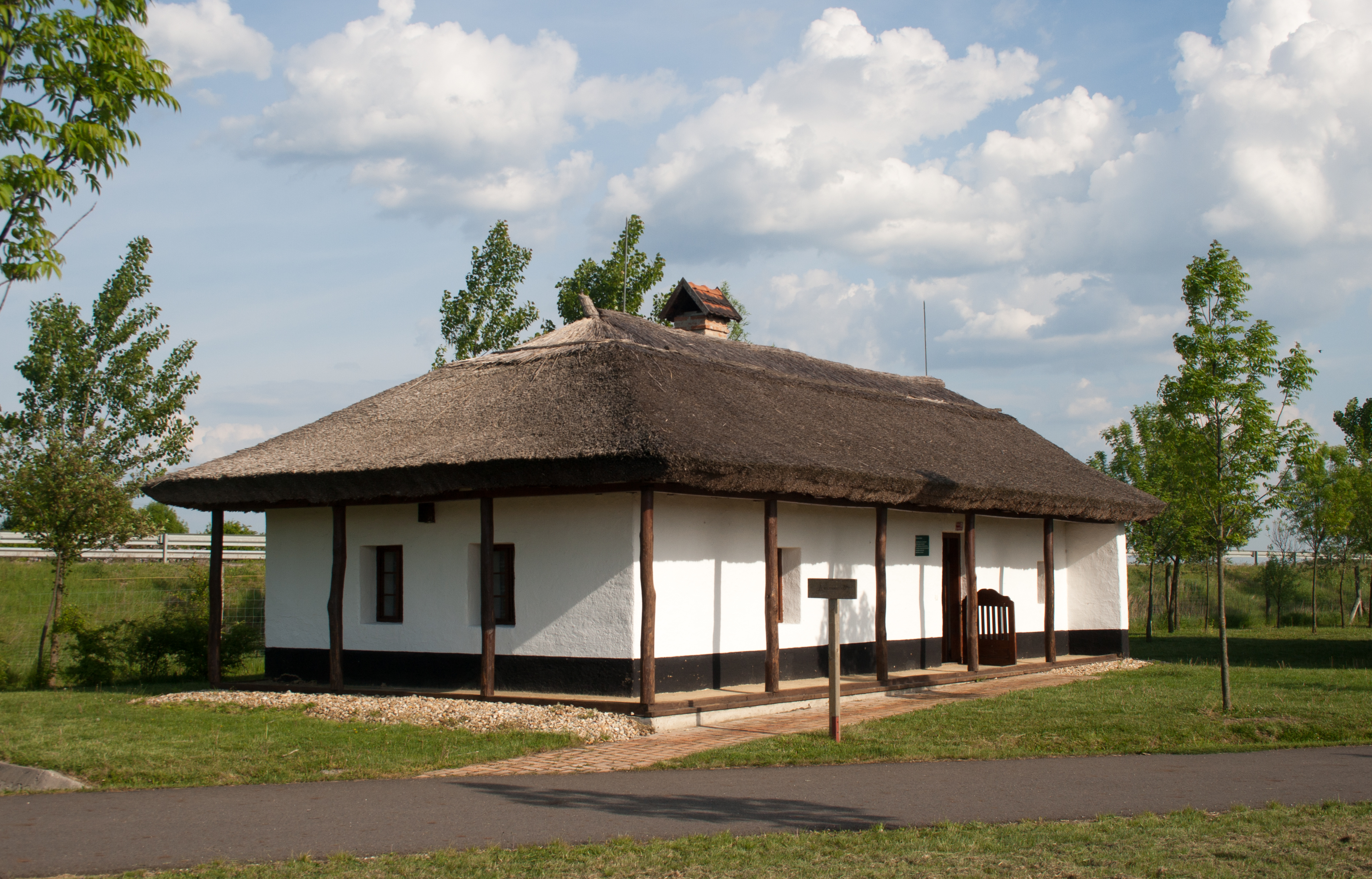
Traditional house from Beszterec

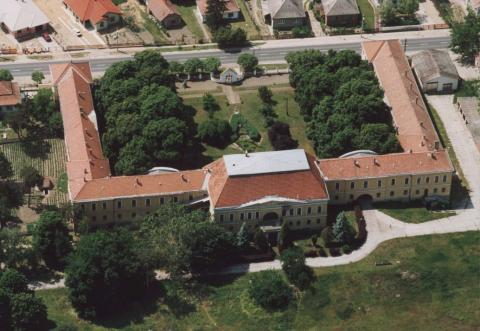
Vay Mansion in Berkesz

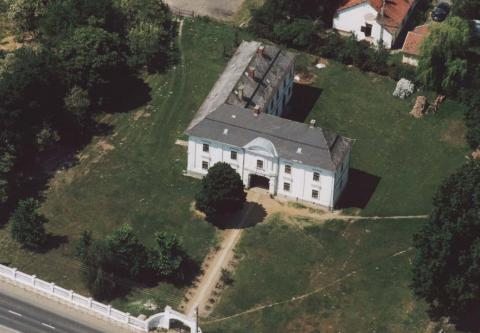
Aerial view of Székely

== See also ==
- List of cities and towns of Hungary
