= Kisvárda District =

Coordinates: 48.2500°N 22.1000°E

Kisvárda District Kisvárdai járás
- Districts of Hungary
- Coat of arms

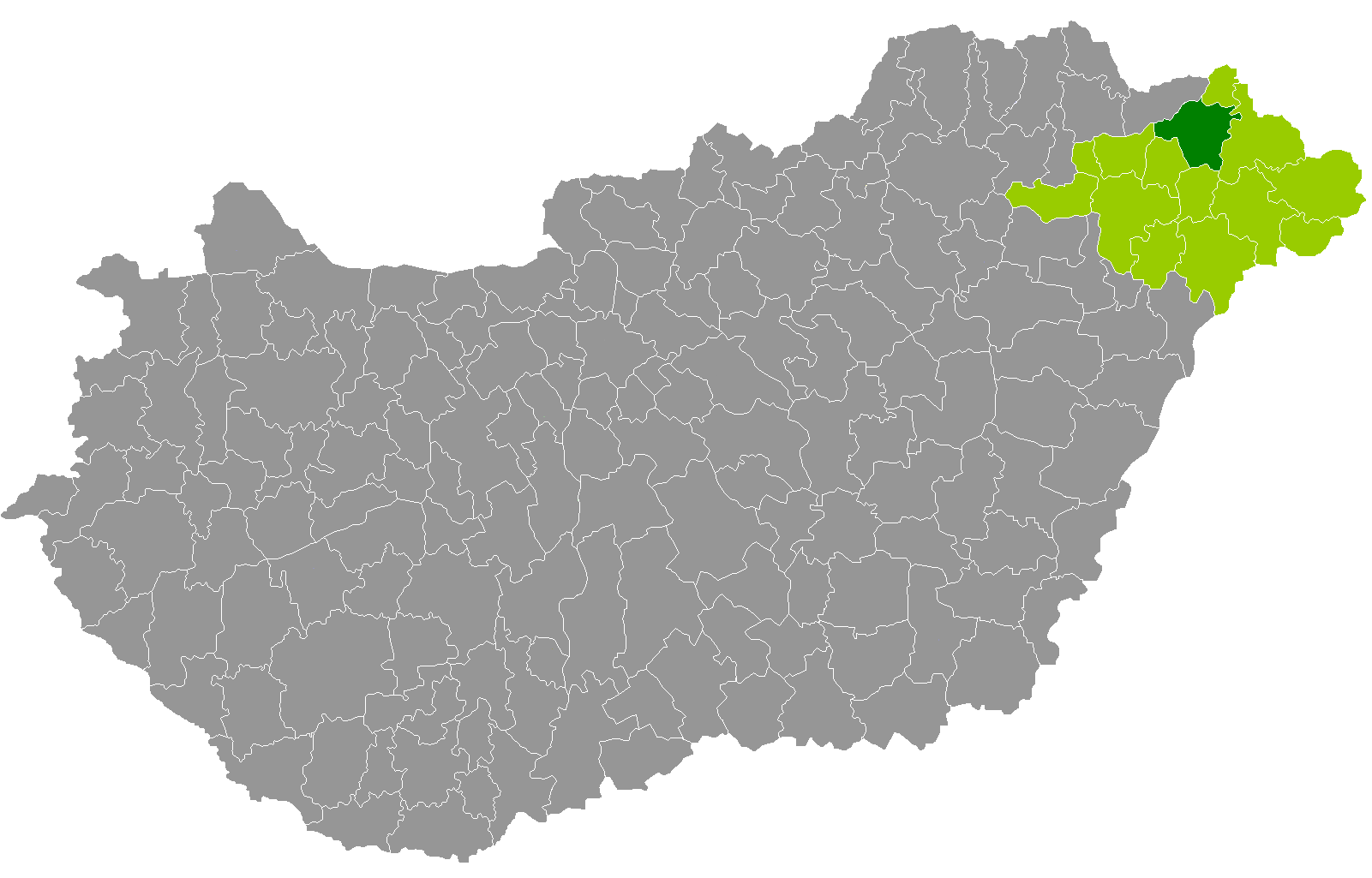
- Kisvárda District within Hungary and Szabolcs-Szatmár-Bereg County.
- Country: Hungary
- County: Szabolcs-Szatmár-Bereg
- District seat: Kisvárda

Area
  - Total: 523.09 km^{2} (201.97 sq mi)
  - Rank: 6th in Szabolcs-Szatmár-Bereg

Population (2011 census)
  - Total: 56,114
  - Rank: 3rd in Szabolcs-Szatmár-Bereg
  - Density: 107/km^{2} (280/sq mi)

Kisvárda (Hungarian: Kisvárdai járás) is a district in northern part of Szabolcs-Szatmár-Bereg County. Kisvárda is also the name of the town where the district seat is found. The district is located in the Northern Great Plain Statistical Region. This district is a part of Rétköz and Nyírség geographical region.

== Geography ==
Kisvárda District borders with Záhony District to the north, Vásárosnamény District to the east, Baktalórántháza District to the south, Kemecse District and Ibrány District to the west, Cigánd District (Borsod-Abaúj-Zemplén County) to the northwest. The number of the inhabited places in Kisvárda District is 23.

== Municipalities ==
The district has 3 towns and 20 villages. (ordered by population, as of 1 January 2013)

- **Ajak** (3,785)
- Anarcs (1,910)
- Döge (2,206)
- **Dombrád** (4,070)
- Fényeslitke (2,516)
- Gyulaháza (1,939)
- Jéke (729)
- Kékcse (1,546)
- **Kisvárda** (16,888) – district seat
- Lövőpetri (467)
- Mezőladány (1,086)
- Nyírkarász (2,371)
- Nyírlövő (676)
- Nyírtass (2,063)
- Pap (1,839)
- Pátroha (2,905)
- Rétközberencs (1,105)
- Szabolcsbáka (1,199)
- Szabolcsveresmart (1,728)
- Tiszakanyár (1,599)
- Tornyospálca (2,655)
- Újdombrád (742)
- Újkenéz (1,026)

The bolded municipalities are cities.

== Demographics ==
Religion in Kisvárda District (2011 census)
1. Calvinism (42.6%)
2. Lutheranism (0.10%)
3. Catholic Church (24.5%)
4. Greek Catholicism (12.6%)
5. Other religions (1.50%)
6. Non-religious (3.40%)
7. Atheists (0.20%)
8. Undeclared (15.1%)

In 2011, it had a population of 56,114 and the population density was 107/km².

Year	County population	Change
2011	56,114	n/a

=== Ethnicity ===
Besides the Hungarian majority, the main minorities are the Roma (approx. 3,500), Ukrainian (200), Russian and German (100).

Total population (2011 census): 56,114
Ethnic groups (2011 census): Identified themselves: 54,880 persons:

- Hungarians: 50,963 (92.86%)
- Gypsies: 3,250 (5.92%)
- Others and indefinable: 667 (1.22%)

Approx. 1,500 persons in Kisvárda District did not declare their ethnic group at the 2011 census.

=== Religion ===
Religious adherence in the county according to 2011 census:

- Reformed – 23,908;
- Catholic – 20,817 (Roman Catholic – 13,770; Greek Catholic – 7,046);
- Evangelical – 77;
- other religions – 844;
- Non-religious – 1,888;
- Atheism – 117;
- Undeclared – 8,463.

== Gallery ==
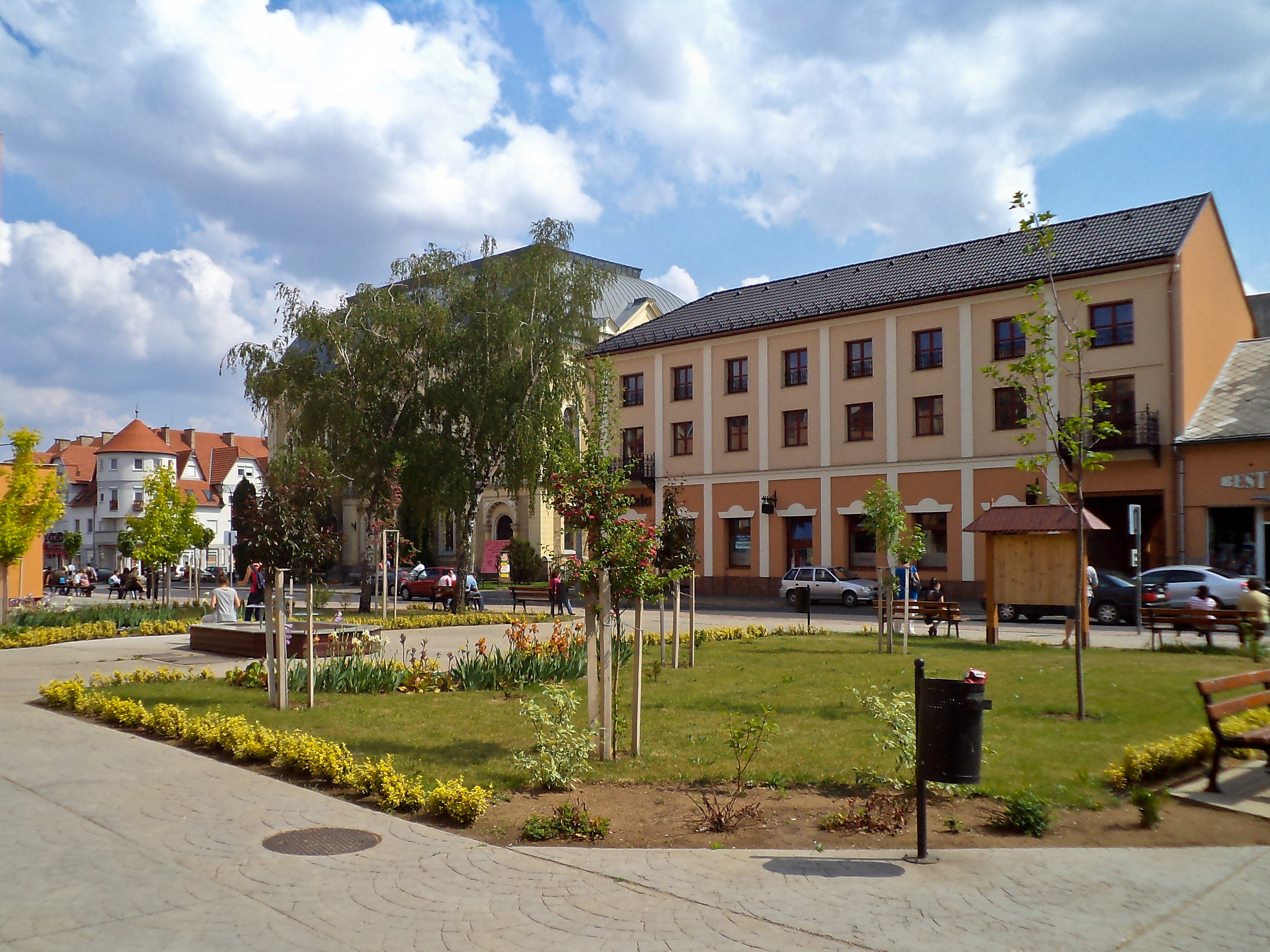
Kisvárda, the district seat

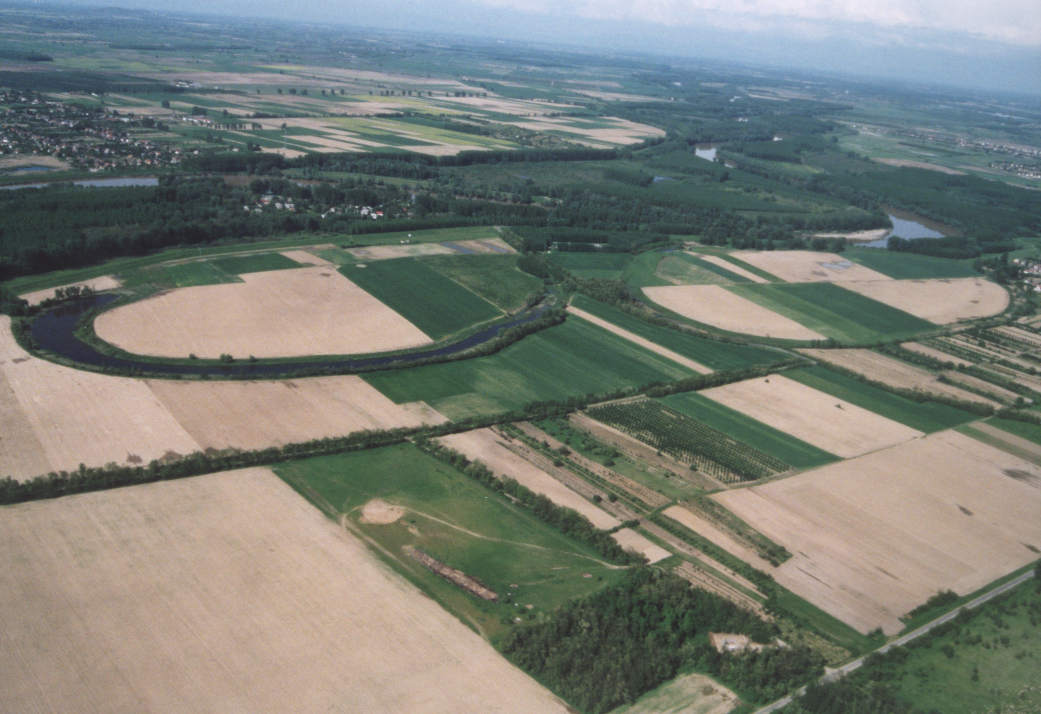
Aerial view of Dombrád

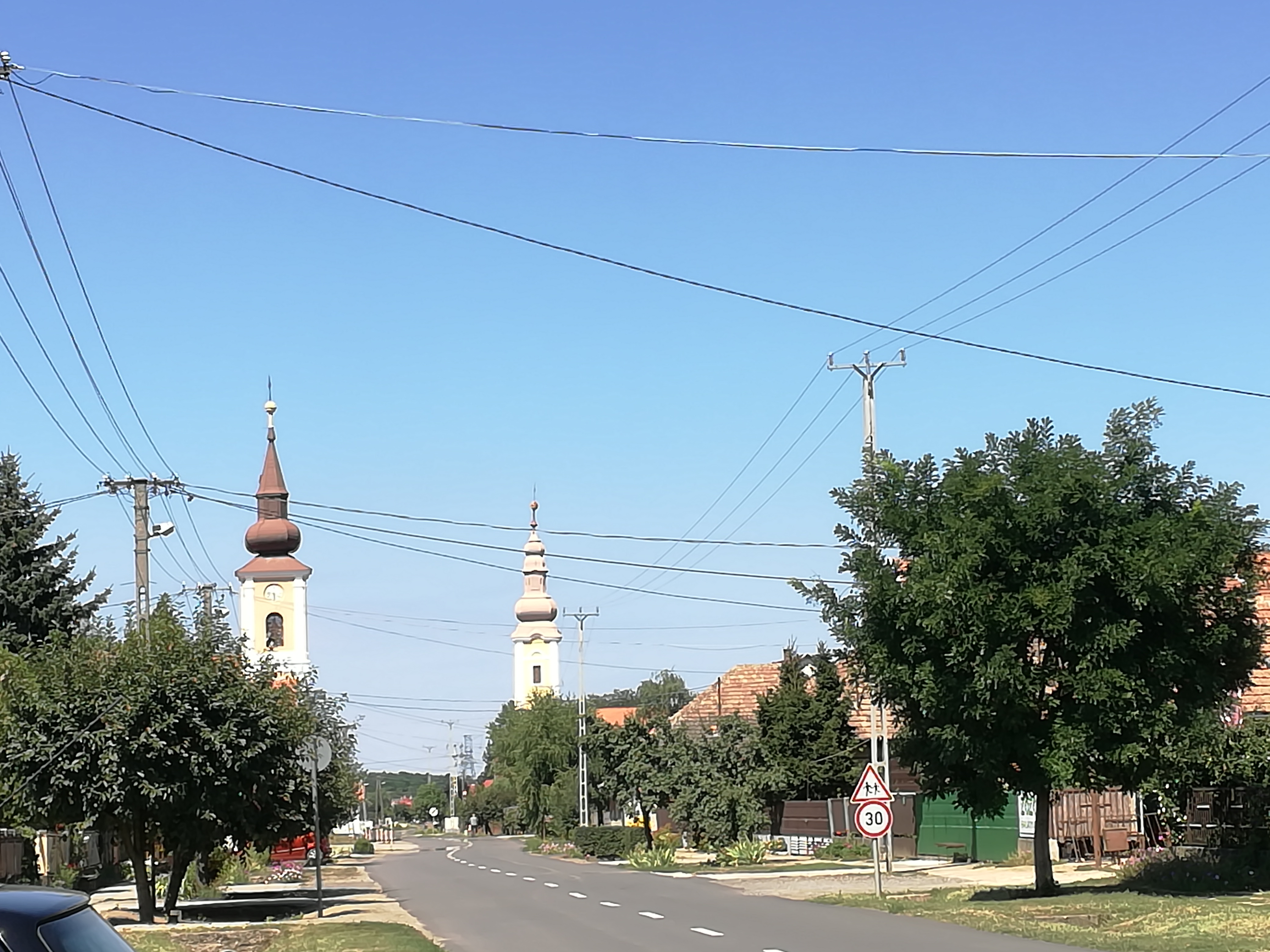
View of Nyírkarász

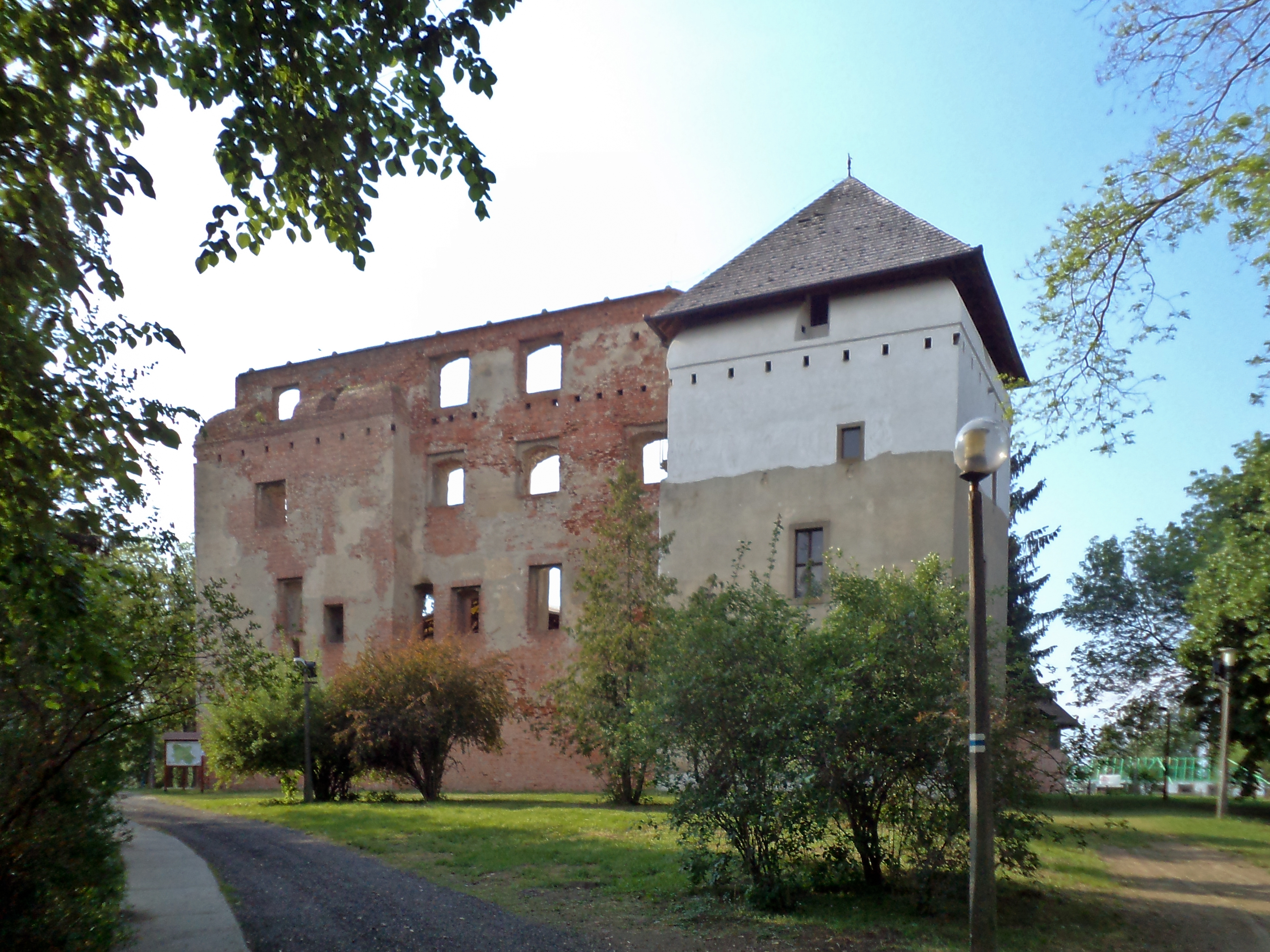
Kisvárda Castle

== See also ==
- List of cities and towns of Hungary
