= Döge =

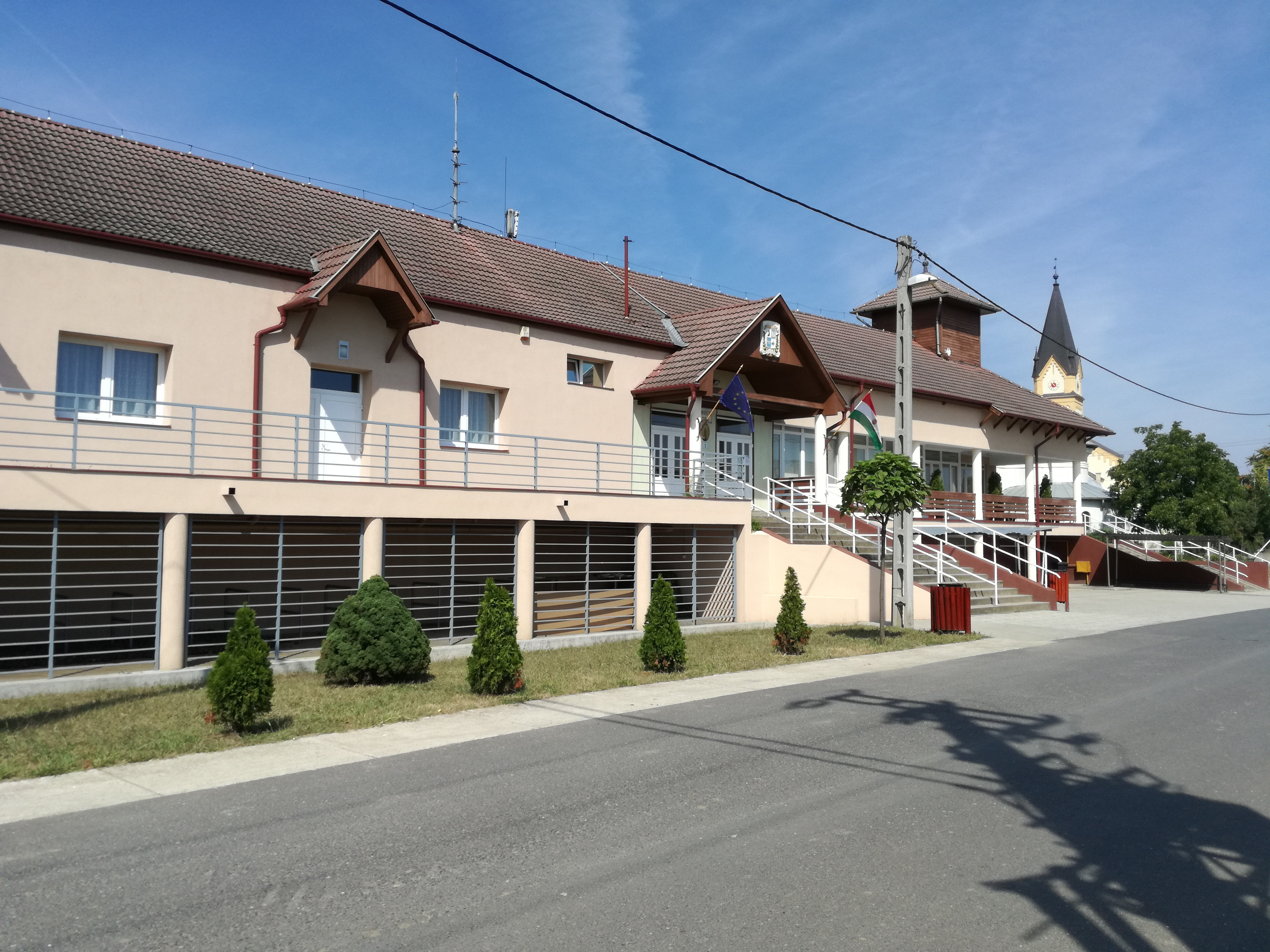

- Coat of arms

- Location of Döge in Hungary
- Coordinates: 48.27°N 22.08°E
- Country: Hungary
- Region: Northern Great Plain
- County: Szabolcs-Szatmár-Bereg

Area
  - Total: 16.54 km^{2} (6.39 sq mi)

Population (2013)
  - Total: 2,206
  - Density: 133.4/km^{2} (345.4/sq mi)
- Time zone: UTC+1 (CET)
  - Summer (DST): UTC+2 (CEST)
- Postal code: 4495
- Area code: +36 45
- Website: http://www.doge.hu

Döge is a village in Szabolcs-Szatmár-Bereg county, in the Northern Great Plain region of eastern Hungary.

== Geography ==
Döge is located in the northwestern part of the county, in the Rétköz region, on the left bank of the Tisza river. It covers an area of 16.54 km^{2} (6 sq mi) and has a population of 2,206 people (2013 estimate).

=== Population ===
Year	1980	1990	2001	2010	2011	2013
Population	2,080 (census)	1,938 (census)	2,178 (census)	2,124 (estimate)	2,107 (census)	2,206 (estimate)

In 2001, 96% of the population identified as Hungarian, and 4% identified as Roma ethnicity.

During the 2011 census, 89.4% of the residents identified as Hungarian, 8.1% as Roma, and 0.5% as Ukrainian (10.4% did not declare their ethnicity; the total sum may be higher than 100% due to dual identities). The religious distribution was as follows: Roman Catholic 15.3%, Reformed 59.4%, Greek Catholic 7.2%, Lutheran 0.2%, non-denominational 2.7% (14.3% did not respond).

=== Neighboring settlements ===
Neighboring settlements are: Fényeslitke to the northeast, Kisvárda to the south, Kékcse to the southwest, and Szabolcsveresmart to the northwest.

Among the important nearby settlements, Kisvárda is 2 kilometers away, Szabolcsveresmart is 11 kilometers away, Komoró is 7.5 kilometers away, Fényeslitke is 5 kilometers away, and Tuzsér is 12 kilometers away.

=== Access ===
The town is crossed by main road 4, making it the most important road access route from other parts of the country. However, the main road bypasses the inhabited areas, and only the road 3832, which runs between Kisvárda and Szabolcsveresmart, passes through the town center. It is also connected to Fényeslitke by road 3839 and intersects with road 4145.

Among the domestic railway lines, the town is located on the (Budapest–)Szolnok–Debrecen–Nyíregyháza–Záhony railway line on its eastern border. However, there is no railway station in the town; the nearest railway connections are the Kisvárda-Hármasút stop and Fényeslitke railway station, both located approximately 3-4 kilometers away from the center of Döge.

== History ==
Döge is a settlement from the era of the Kingdom of Hungary. Its name was first mentioned in documents in 1284 as Kysduge.

Around 1270-1290, it was referred to as Dioga, later as Kis- and Nagy-Döge.

In the early 1300s, the Várday family owned the settlement.

In the first half of the 1500s, it belonged to the Cserney and Soós families.

In the 17th and 18th centuries, it was owned by several families, including the Esterházy, Szögyényi, Horváth, Nozdroviczky, Erőss, and Salamon families.

At the beginning of the 20th century, the Elek and Ferenczy families owned land here. In 1944, Jármy Mária was a major landowner.

In the 1910 census, it had a population of 1,725, of which 1,721 were Hungarian, including 1,330 Reformed, 262 Roman Catholic, and 74 Greek Catholic.

In the early 1900s, it belonged to the Kisvárdai district of Szabolcs County.

== Government ==
Mayors of Döge have included:

- 1990-1994: Ferenc Vincze (independent)
- 1994-1998: Ferenc Vincze (independent)
- 1998-2002: Ferenc Vincze (independent)
- 2002-2006: Ferenc Tibor Vincze (independent)
- 2006-2010: Ferenc Tibor Vincze (independent)
- 2010-2014: Dr. Péter Nagy (Fidesz-KDNP)
- 2014-2019: Dr. Péter Nagy (Fidesz-KDNP)
- From 2019: Dr. Péter Nagy (Fidesz-KDNP)
