= Ibrány =

Coordinates: 48°08′N 21°43′E

- Town
- Flag Coat of arms
- Interactive map of Ibrány
- Country: Hungary
- County: Szabolcs-Szatmár-Bereg
- District: Ibrány

Area
  - Total: 60.42 km^{2} (23.33 sq mi)

Population (2015)
  - Total: 6,751
  - Density: 111.9/km^{2} (290/sq mi)
- Time zone: UTC+1 (CET)
  - Summer (DST): UTC+2 (CEST)
- Postal code: 4484
- Area code: (+36) 42
- Website: www.ibrany.hu

Ibrány is a town in Szabolcs-Szatmár-Bereg county, in the Northern Great Plain region of eastern Hungary.

== Geography ==
It covers an area of 60.42 km^{2} (23 sq mi) and has a population of 6751 people (2015).

== Twin towns – sister cities ==
Ibrány is twinned with:

- Głogów Małopolski, Poland
- Gornești, Romania
- Gradisca d'Isonzo, Italy
- Krásnohorská Dlhá Lúka, Slovakia
