= Main Road 4 Killer =

Unidentified Hungarian serial killer

Details
- Victims: 4+
- Span of crimes: 2007 – 2010 (confirmed)
- Country: Hungary
- State: Jász–Nagykun–Szolnok

The Main Road 4 Killer is the name given to an unidentified Hungarian serial killer who has been linked to at least three murders and one disappearance involving prostitutes along Main road 4 near Karcag from 2007 to 2010. The case was investigated both by the Hungarian police and the FBI, but to this day, nobody has been arrested for any of the crimes.

== Murders ==
The first victim was a 34-year-old prostitute from Püspökladány named Zoltánné V., who disappeared in either late August or early September 2007. Despite the fact that she had three children, she was not reported missing until a couple of months later, when the children's foster mother contacted the police. Zoltánné's fate remained a mystery until 2011, when her remains were finally located.

The second victim, 17-year-old Angéla Tyukodi, often prostituted herself at a rest stop near Karcag. On 22 May 2010, at around 9 pm, her boyfriend came with his bicycle to pick her up, but noticed her getting into a red or burgundy car that later headed towards Debrecen. Since then, Tyukodi has never been found and remains listed as a missing person.

The third victim, a 24-year-old prostitute named Piroska P., was killed on 19 June 2010 at the Pallag junction near Téglás. Analysis of her cellphone data determined that her last recorded conversation took place at 5:22 pm, indicating that she was likely killed shortly afterwards, as her body was found at 5:38 pm.

On 21 August 2010, the body of 24-year-old prostitute Erzsébet L. was found in a ditch nearby a road connecting Karcag and Buscá. She was last seen on the previous night drinking at the Csikó Fekete pub in Bucsa with friends and relatives. Her boyfriend – who had broken up with her the night prior – went to the location where he had last seen her after Erzsébet failed to return his calls several times, noticing the body after he heard her phone ringing from the ditch. Unlike the previous located victims, all of whom had been stabbed to death, Erzsébet was strangled.

== Profile ==
With the help of the FBI, the Hungarian police developed a psychological profile of the Main Road 4 Killer. According to it, the following characteristics apply to him:

- always killed on a Saturday, indicating that he was most likely working on weekdays
- drove a red or burgundy car
- was unsuccessful in his personal life
- hated "assertive" women
- was fond of knives
- was comfortable around prostitutes and often used their services
- was familiar with Karcag and the surrounding area

In an effort to entice the public to give tips, the police sent letters to more than 22,000 families across the country, offering 1 million forints as a reward for any possible leads. In a press conference, Maj. General Attila Petőfi stated that the killer removed all of the victims' clothes and stole their handbags, but noted that there were no signs of sexual abuse. He also disspelled rumors that the victims were decapitated, as well as claims that a recently unearthed skeleton found on the outskirts of Karcag was linked to the case, as it was determined to be that of a male.

However, nobody has ever been charged with any of the cases linked to the Main Road 4 Killer, which remain unsolved. Due to the passage of time and no further violent crimes having been linked to the perpetrator, media outlets have speculated that he is either deceased, imprisoned, or moved away.

In 2022, the reward money was withdrawn and the investigation suspended for all cases besides that of Piroska P. Due to this, if the killer is ever identified in these cases, they cannot be prosecuted.

== Suspects ==
=== Tibor Foco ===
One notable suspect in the case is Tibor Foco, an Austrian national of Hungarian descent who was sentenced to life imprisonment for the torture-murder of prostitute Elfriede "Bunny" Hochgatterer in Linz in 1986. He escaped from prison in 1995 and remains an internationally wanted fugitive sought by both Interpol and Europol. A reward of 8 million Hungarian forints is offered for any information that could lead to his capture.

Due to the nature of his crime, Foco has been proposed as a possible suspect in the Main Road 4 Killer case. Besides this, both Hungarian and Austrian media have speculated that he might be responsible for other murders in his native Austria committed while on the run from the law.

=== Jozséf E. ===
A suspect in the murder of Piroska P. was a man named Jozséf E., a football coach who confessed to killing prostitute Amália F. in Lakitelek in 2010 after being arrested for the near-fatal stabbing of another woman on a highway two years later. In his confession, he claimed that the woman made fun of him for being unable to sustain an erection, after which he beat her to death with a car jack. For these crimes, he was convicted and sentenced to life imprisonment in 2015.

Jozséf was suspected because he admitted to having sex with Piroska P. on previous occasions, but steadfastly denied involvement in the murder.

=== Antal K. ===
Yet another suspect in the murder of Piroska P. was 46-year-old accountant Antal K., who was arrested for the 2018 murder of a prostitute in Mándok and the attempted murder of a store clerk in Nyíregyháza. While investigating him, authorities learned that Antal had previously been in a relationship with Piroska, leading them to consider him a possible suspect. However, investigators were unable to link him to any of the cases.

== See also ==
- List of serial killers by country
