= Komoro =

Komoro may refer to:

- Komoro, Nagano, Japan
  - Komoro Domain
- Kömörő, Szabolcs-Szatmár-Bereg county, Hungary
- Komoró, Szabolcs-Szatmár-Bereg county, Hungary

== See also ==
- Comoro (disambiguation)
