= Ibrány District =

Coordinates: 48.1167°N 21.7667°E

Ibrány District Ibrányi járás
- Districts of Hungary
- Coat of arms

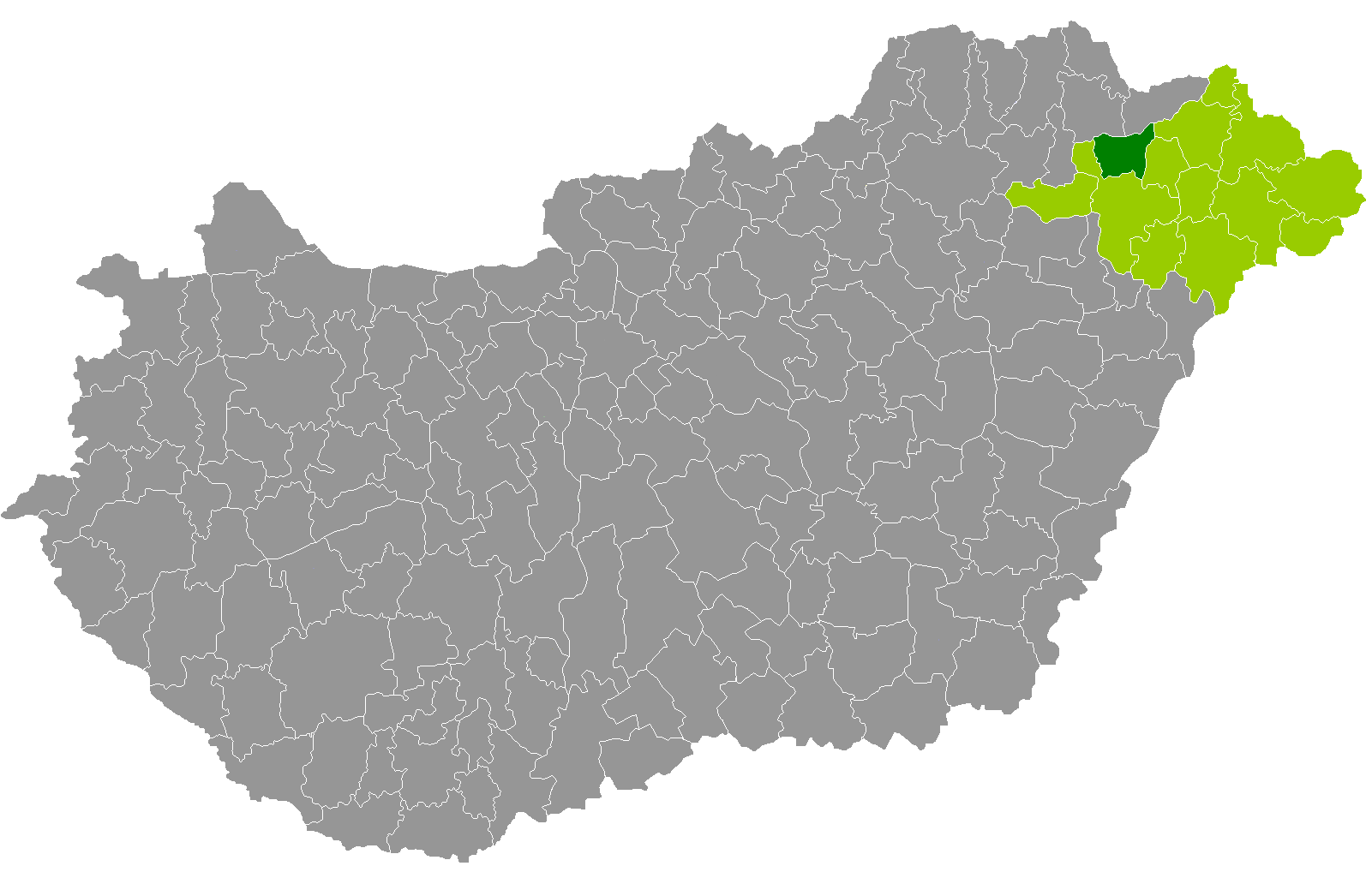
- Ibrány District within Hungary and Szabolcs-Szatmár-Bereg County.
- Country: Hungary
- County: Szabolcs-Szatmár-Bereg
- District seat: Ibrány

Area
  - Total: 304.91 km^{2} (117.73 sq mi)
  - Rank: 9th in Szabolcs-Szatmár-Bereg

Population (2011 census)
  - Total: 23,679
  - Rank: 9th in Szabolcs-Szatmár-Bereg
  - Density: 78/km^{2} (200/sq mi)

Ibrány (Hungarian: Ibrányi járás) is a district in the north-western part of Szabolcs-Szatmár-Bereg County in Hungary. Ibrány is also the name of the town where the district seat is located. The district lies in the Northern Great Plain Statistical Region. This district is part of Rétköz geographical region.

== Geography ==
Ibrány District borders Sárospatak District and Cigánd District (Borsod-Abaúj-Zemplén County) to the north, Kisvárda District and Kemecse District to the east, Nyíregyháza District to the south and west. The number of the inhabited places in Ibrány District is 8.

== Municipalities ==
The district has 2 towns, 1 large village and 5 villages. (ordered by population, as of 1 January 2013)

- Balsa (837)
- Buj (2,303)
- Gávavencsellő (3,528)
- **Ibrány** (6,835) – district seat
- **Nagyhalász** (5,741)
- Paszab (1,273)
- Tiszabercel (1,897)
- Tiszatelek (1,436)

The bolded municipalities are cities, italics municipality is large village.

== Demographics ==
Religion in Ibrány District (2011 census)
1. Calvinism (37.3%)
2. Lutheranism (0.40%)
3. Catholic Church (23.5%)
4. Greek Catholicism (8.50%)
5. Other religions (2.00%)
6. Non-religious (8.20%)
7. Atheists (0.30%)
8. Undeclared (19.8%)

In 2011, it had a population of 23,679 and the population density was 78/km².

Year	County population	Change
2011	23,679	n/a

=== Ethnicity ===
Besides the Hungarian majority, the main minorities are the Roma (approx. 2,500) and German (150).

Total population (2011 census): 23,679
Ethnic groups (2011 census): Identified themselves: 23,826 persons:

- Hungarians: 20,973 (88.02%)
- Gypsies: 2,592 (10.88%)
- Others and indefinable: 261 (1.10%)

Approx. 150 persons in Ibrány District did declare more than one ethnic group at the 2011 census.

=== Religion ===
Religious adherence in the county according to 2011 census:

- Reformed – 8,835;
- Catholic – 7,592 (Roman Catholic – 5,575; Greek Catholic – 2,017);
- Evangelical – 92;
- other religions – 471;
- Non-religious – 1,936;
- Atheism – 71;
- Undeclared – 4,682.

== Gallery ==
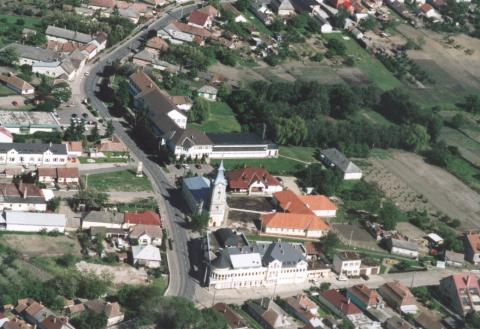
Aerial view of Nagyhalász

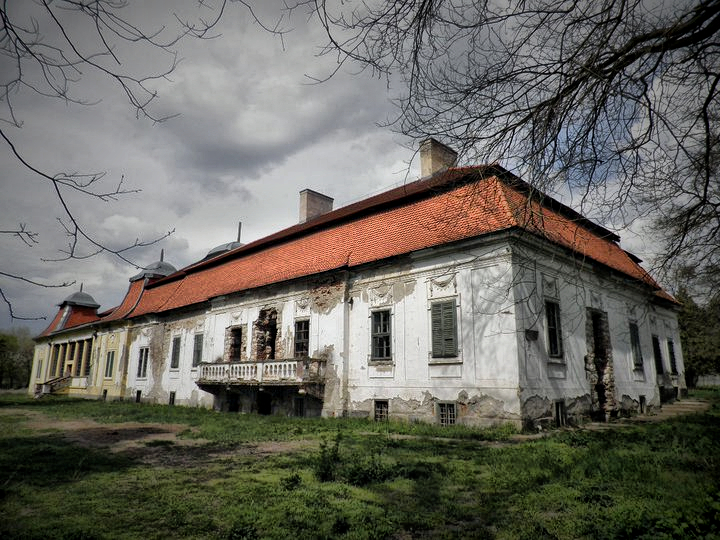
Dessewffy Mansion in Gávavencsellő

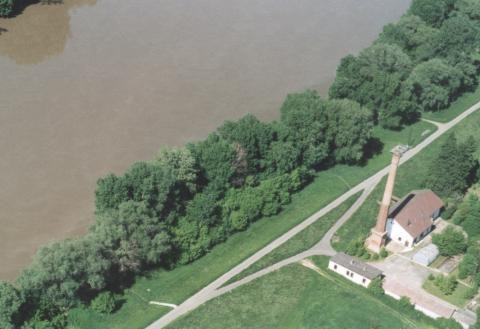
Aerial view of Tiszabercel

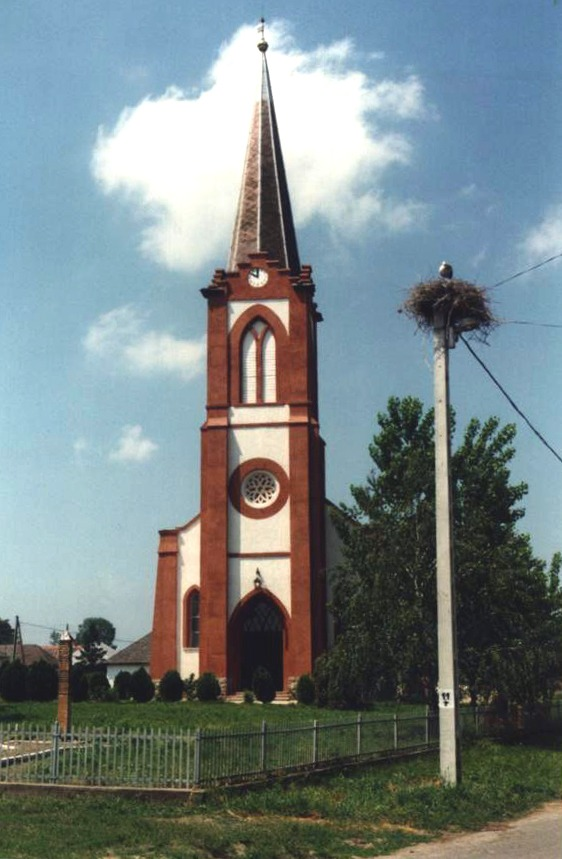
Reformed Church in Balsa

== See also ==
- List of cities and towns of Hungary
