= Záhony District =

Coordinates: 48.40478454372°N 22.17691832478836°E

Záhony District Záhonyi járás
- Districts of Hungary
- Coat of arms

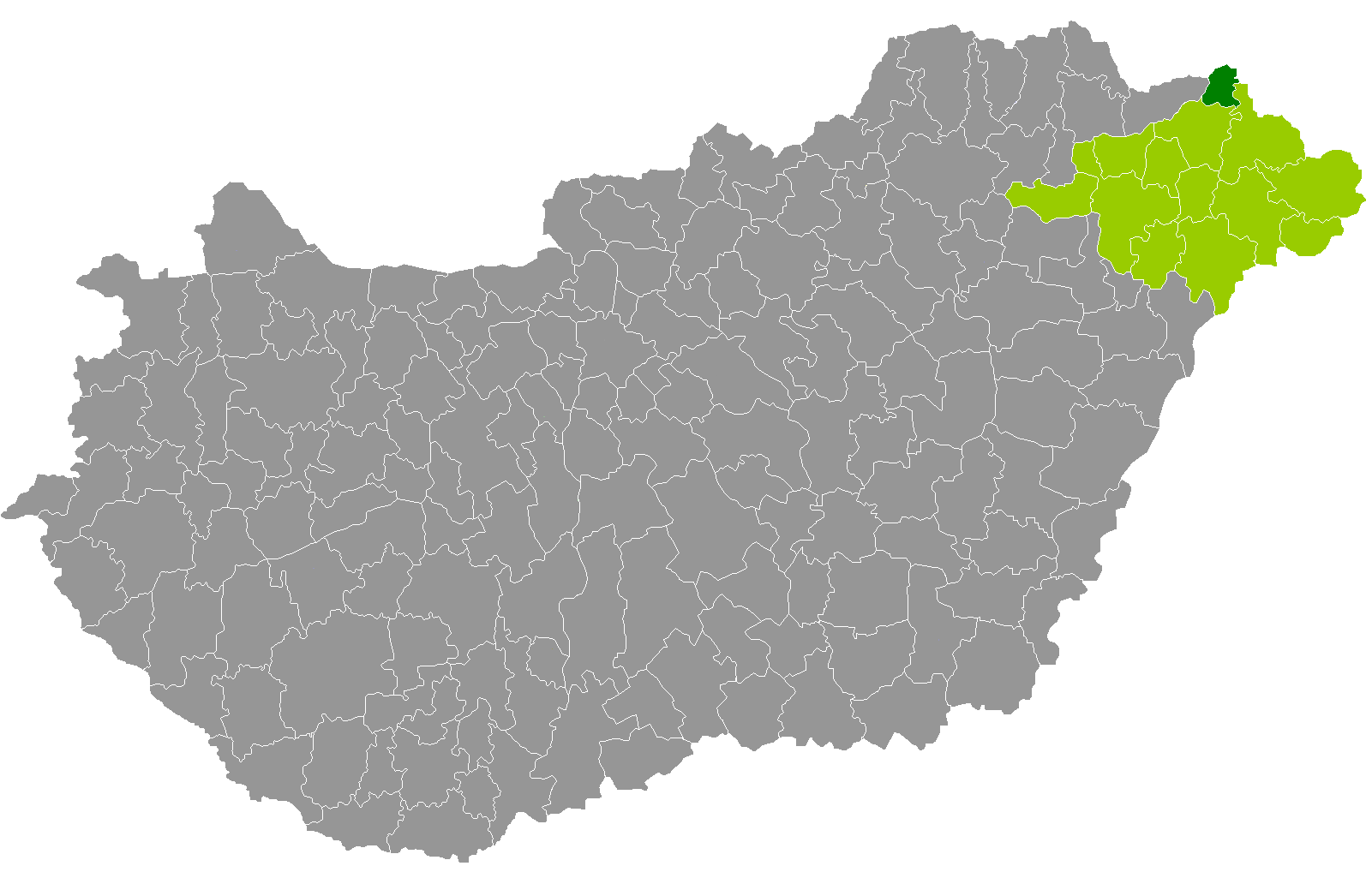
- Záhony District within Hungary and Szabolcs-Szatmár-Bereg County.
- Country: Hungary
- County: Szabolcs-Szatmár-Bereg
- District seat: Záhony

Area
  - Total: 145.95 km^{2} (56.35 sq mi)
  - Rank: 13th in Szabolcs-Szatmár-Bereg

Population (2011 census)
  - Total: 18,963
  - Rank: 12th in Szabolcs-Szatmár-Bereg
  - Density: 130/km^{2} (340/sq mi)

Záhony (Hungarian: Záhonyi járás) is a district in northern part of Szabolcs-Szatmár-Bereg County. Záhony is also the town where the district seat is found. The district is located in the Northern Great Plain statistical region. This district is a part of Rétköz geographical region.

== Geography ==
Záhony District borders with the Ukrainian Zakarpattia Oblast to the northeast, Vásárosnamény District to the southeast, Kisvárda District to the south, Cigánd District (Borsod-Abaúj-Zemplén County) to the west, the Slovak Košice Region to the northwest. The number of the inhabited places in Záhony District is 11.

== Municipalities ==
The district has two towns (bolded), one large village (in italics) and eight villages. (ordered by population, as of 1 January 2013)

- Benk (440)
- Eperjeske (1,217)
- Győröcske (124)
- Komoró (1,289)
- **Mándok** (4,247)
- Tiszabezdéd (1,925)
- Tiszamogyorós (687)
- Tiszaszentmárton (1,151)
- Tuzsér (3,418)
- **Záhony** (4,125) – district seat
- Zsurk (746)

== Demographics ==
Religion in Záhony District (2011 census)
1. Calvinism (56.1%)
2. Catholic Church (12.7%)
3. Greek Catholicism (5.80%)
4. Other religions (2.20%)
5. Non-religious (3.80%)
6. Atheists (0.20%)
7. Undeclared (19.2%)

In 2011, it had a population of 18,963 and the population density was 130/km^{2}.

Year	County population	Change
2011	18,963	n/a

=== Ethnicity ===
Besides the Hungarian majority, the main minorities are the Roma (approx. 2,500) and Ukrainian (100).

Total population (2011 census): 18,963
Ethnic groups (2011 census): Identified themselves: 19,372 persons:

- Hungarians: 16,689 (86.15%)
- Gypsies: 2,420 (12.49%)
- Others and indefinable: 263 (1.36%)

Approx. 500 persons in Záhony District did declare more than one ethnic group at the 2011 census.

=== Religion ===
Religious adherence in the county according to 2011 census:

- Reformed – 10,635;
- Catholic – 3,499 (Roman Catholic – 2,401; Greek Catholic – 1,098);
- other religions – 426;
- Non-religious – 725;
- Atheism – 39;
- Undeclared – 3,639.

== Gallery ==
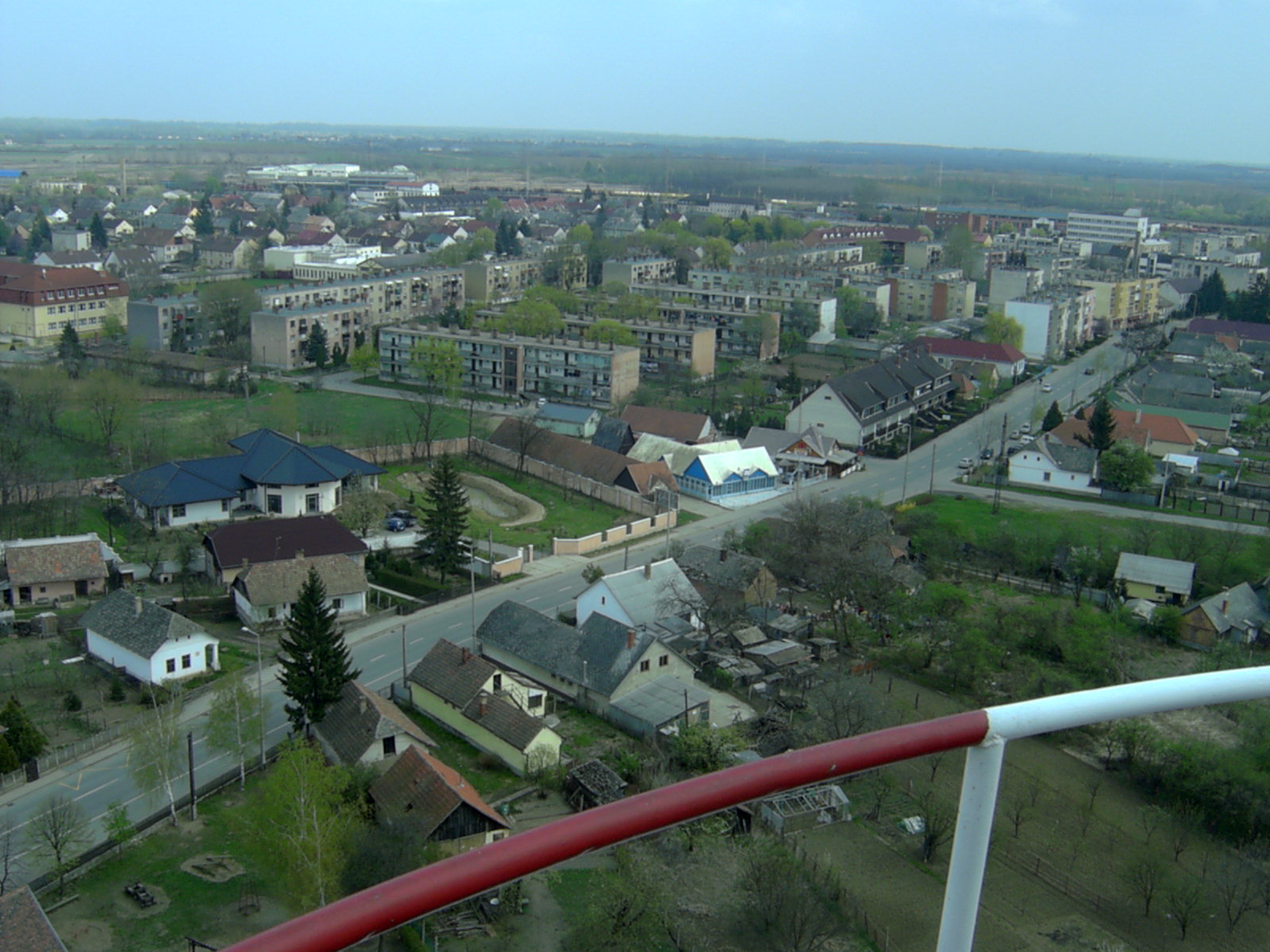
Záhony, the district seat

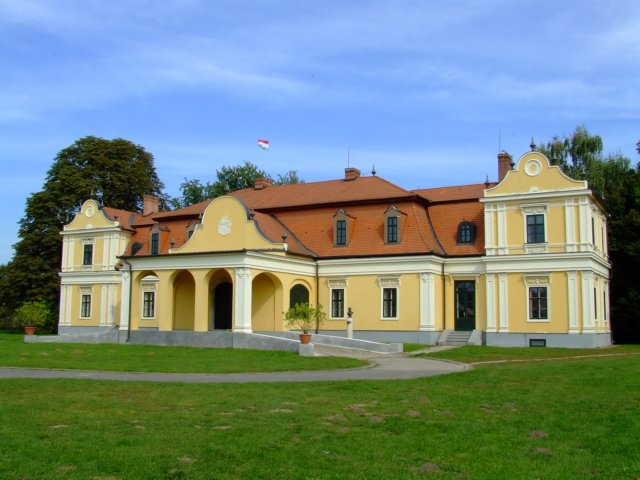
Lónyay Mansion in Tuzsér

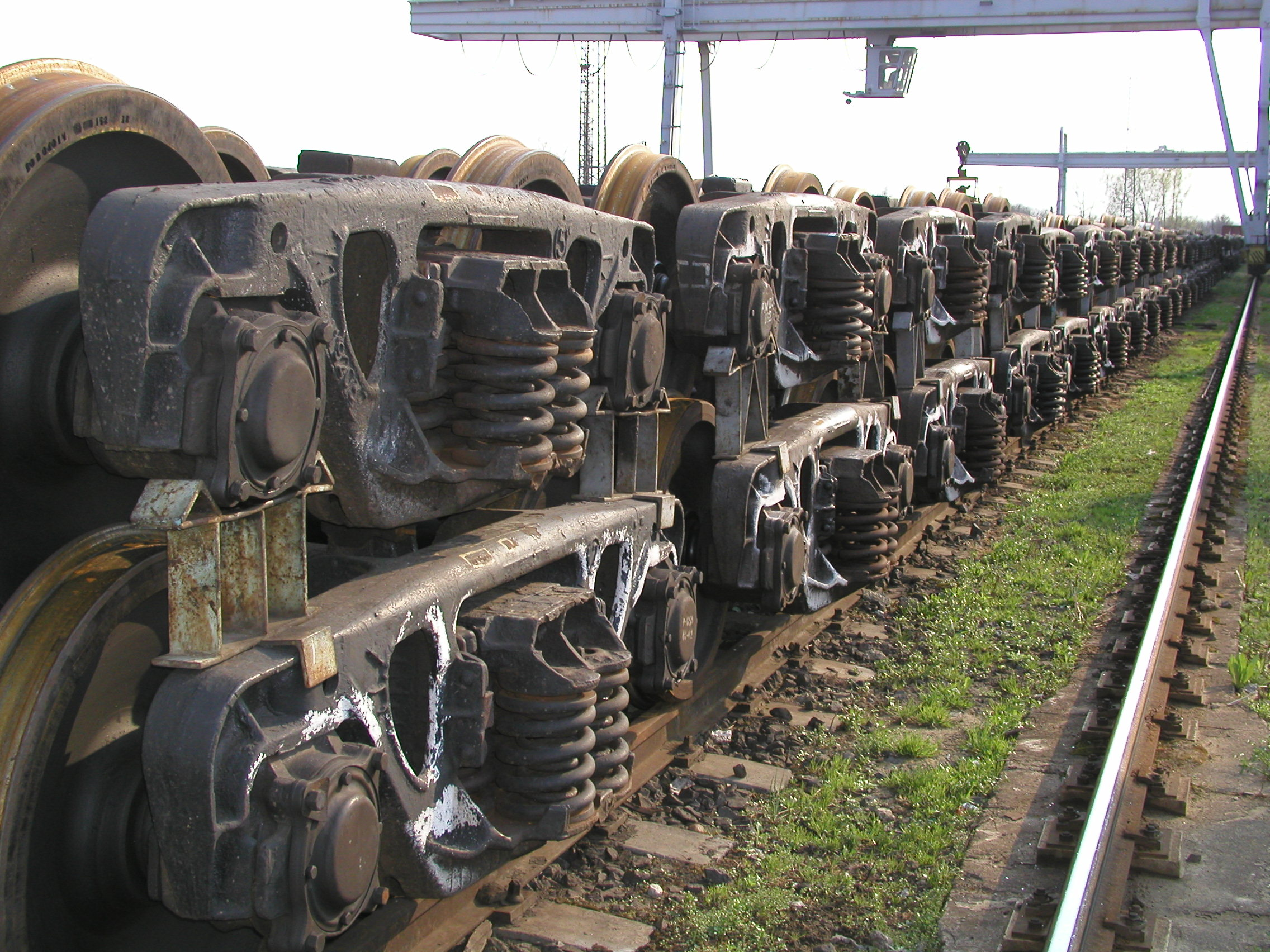
Záhony Railway Freight Terminal

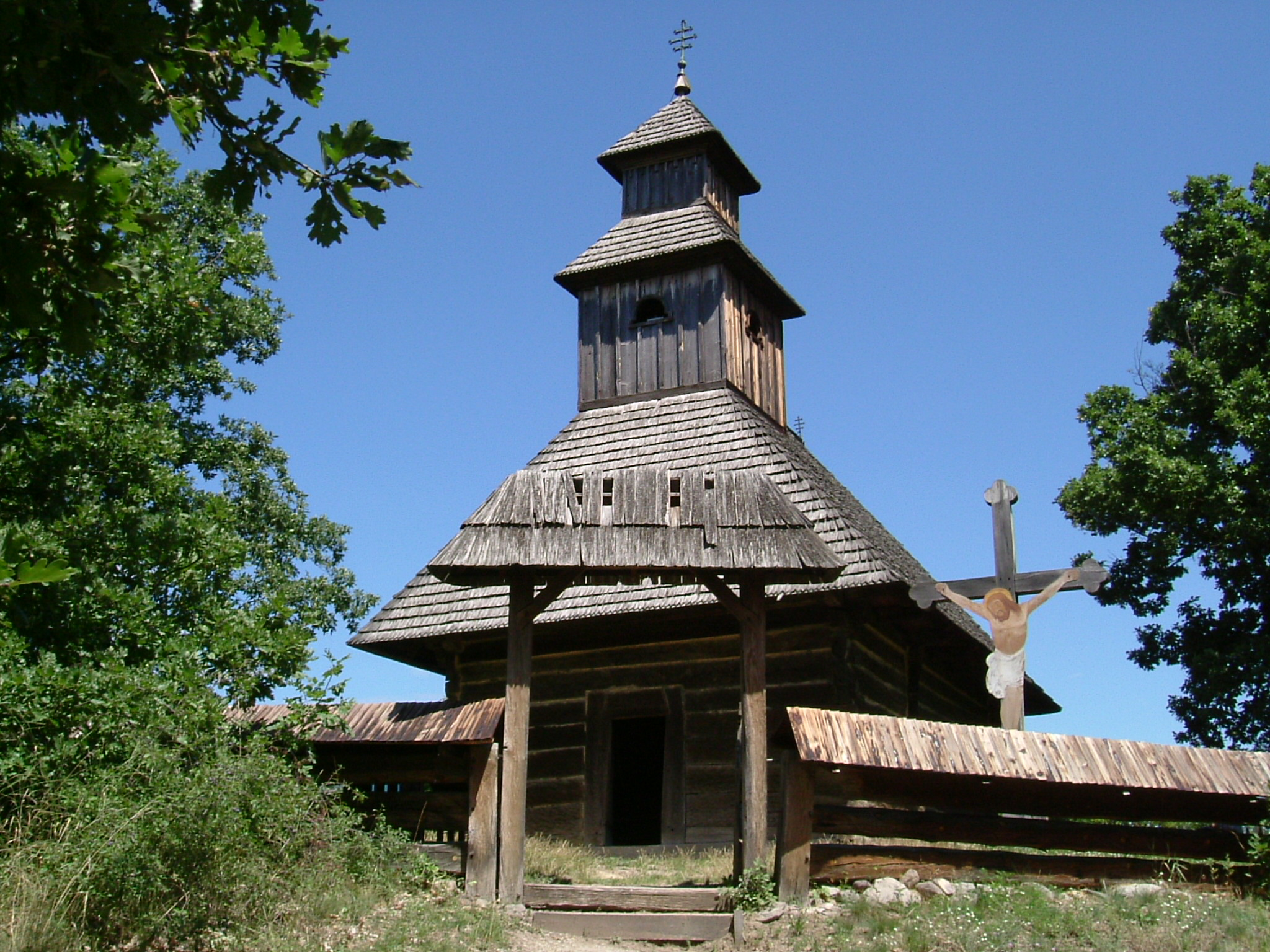
Greek Catholic Church in Mándok

== See also ==
- List of cities and towns of Hungary
