= Tiszacsermely =

- Village
- Flag Coat of arms

- Location of Tiszacsermely
- Coordinates: 48.23308°N 21.78808°E
- Country: Hungary
- Region: Northern Hungary
- County: Borsod-Abaúj-Zemplén
- District: Cigánd

Area
  - Total: 20.27 km^{2} (7.83 sq mi)

Population (1 January 2026)
  - Total: 395
  - Density: 19.5/km^{2} (50.5/sq mi)
- Time zone: UTC+1 (CET)
  - Summer (DST): UTC+2 (CEST)
- Postal code: 3972
- Area code: (+36) 47
- Website: tiszacsermely.hu

Tiszacsermely is a village in Borsod-Abaúj-Zemplén county, Hungary.
