= Cigánd District =

Coordinates: 48.3000°N 21.8833°E

Cigánd District Cigándi járás
- Districts of Hungary
- Coat of arms

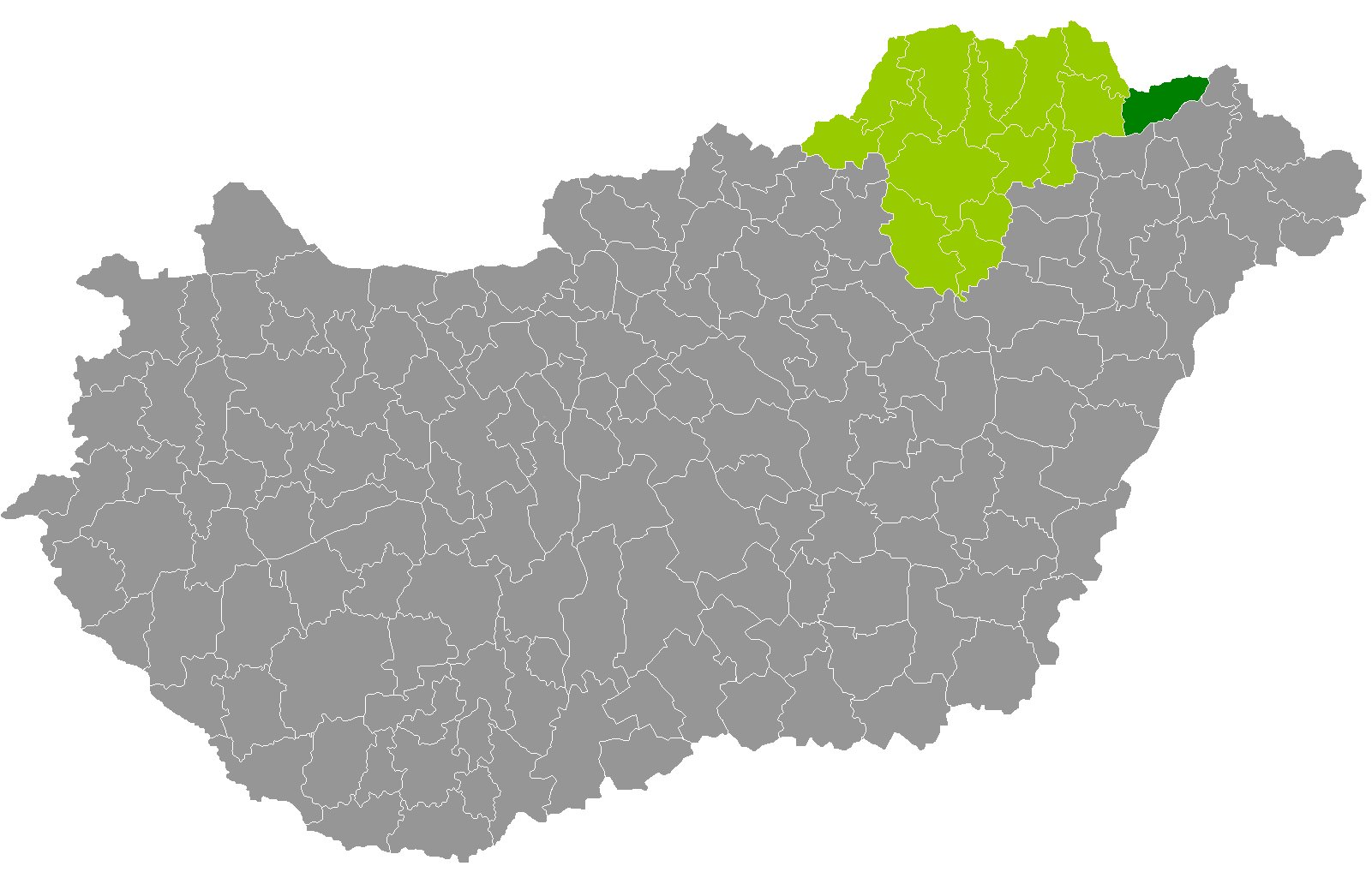
- Country: Hungary
- County: Borsod-Abaúj-Zemplén
- District seat: Cigánd

Area
  - Total: 389.99 km^{2} (150.58 sq mi)
  - Rank: 8th in Borsod-Abaúj-Zemplén

Population (2011 census)
  - Total: 16,042
  - Rank: 14th in Borsod-Abaúj-Zemplén
  - Density: 41/km^{2} (110/sq mi)

Cigánd (Hungarian: Cigándi járás) is a district in north-eastern part of Borsod-Abaúj-Zemplén County. The district seat is in a town that is called Cigánd as well. The district is located in the Northern Hungary Statistical Region.

== Geography ==
Cigánd District borders with the Slovak Košice Region to the north, Záhony District (Szabolcs-Szatmár-Bereg County) to the east, Kisvárda District and Ibrány District (Szabolcs-Szatmár-Bereg County) to the south, Sárospatak District and Sátoraljaújhely District to the west. The number of the inhabited places in Cigánd District is 15.

== Municipalities ==
The district has one town (bolded), one large village (in italics) and 13 villages. (ordered by population, as of 1 January 2012)

- Bodroghalom (1,303)
- **Cigánd** (2,682) – district seat
- Dámóc (397)
- Karcsa (1,734)
- Karos (496)
- Kisrozvágy (121)
- Lácacséke (264)
- Nagyrozvágy (609)
- Pácin (1,381)
- Révleányvár (469)
- Ricse (1,661)
- Semjén (446)
- Tiszacsermely (554)
- Tiszakarád (2,279)
- Zemplénagárd (722)

== Demographics ==
Religion in Cigánd District (2011 census)
1. Calvinism (49.6%)
2. Catholic Church (15.6%)
3. Greek Catholicism (7.90%)
4. Other religions (2.70%)
5. Non-religious (8.90%)
6. Atheists (0.10%)
7. Undeclared (15.2%)

In 2011, it had a population of 16,042 and the population density was 41/km².

Year	County population	Change
2011	16,042	n/a

=== Ethnicity ===
Besides the Hungarian majority, the main minority is the Roma (approx. 3,000).

Total population (2011 census): 16,042
Ethnic groups (2011 census): Identified themselves: 17,333 persons:

- Hungarians: 14,606 (84.27%)
- Gypsies: 2,646 (15.27%)
- Others and indefinable: 81 (0.47%)

Approx. 1,500 persons in Cigánd District did declare more than one ethnic group at the 2011 census.

=== Religion ===
Religious adherence in the county according to 2011 census:

- Reformed – 7,958;
- Catholic – 3,770 (Roman Catholic – 2,510; Greek Catholic – 1,260);
- other religions – 438;
- Non-religious – 1,419;
- Atheism – 21;
- Undeclared – 2,436.

== Gallery ==
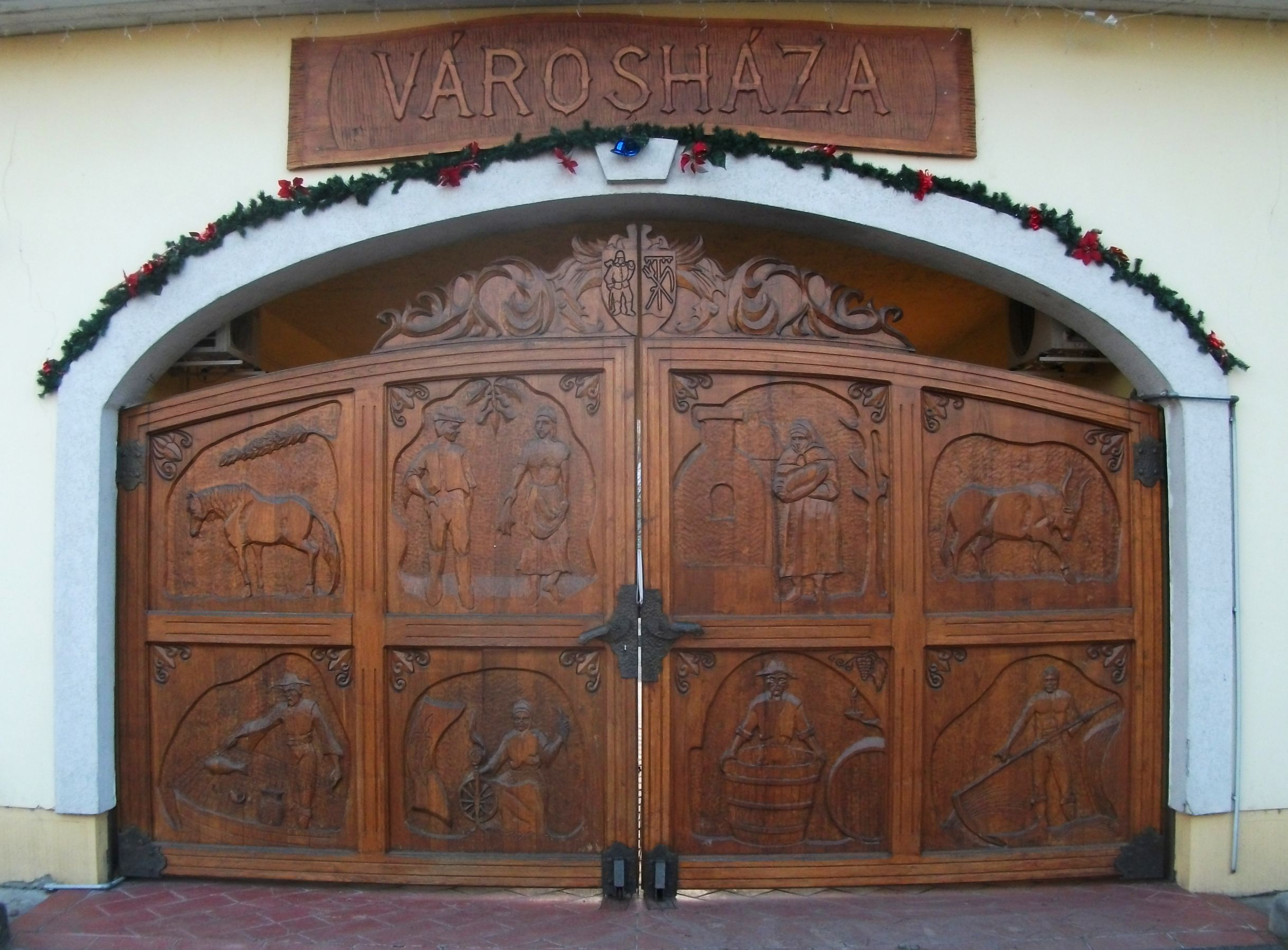
Gates of Town Hall in Cigánd

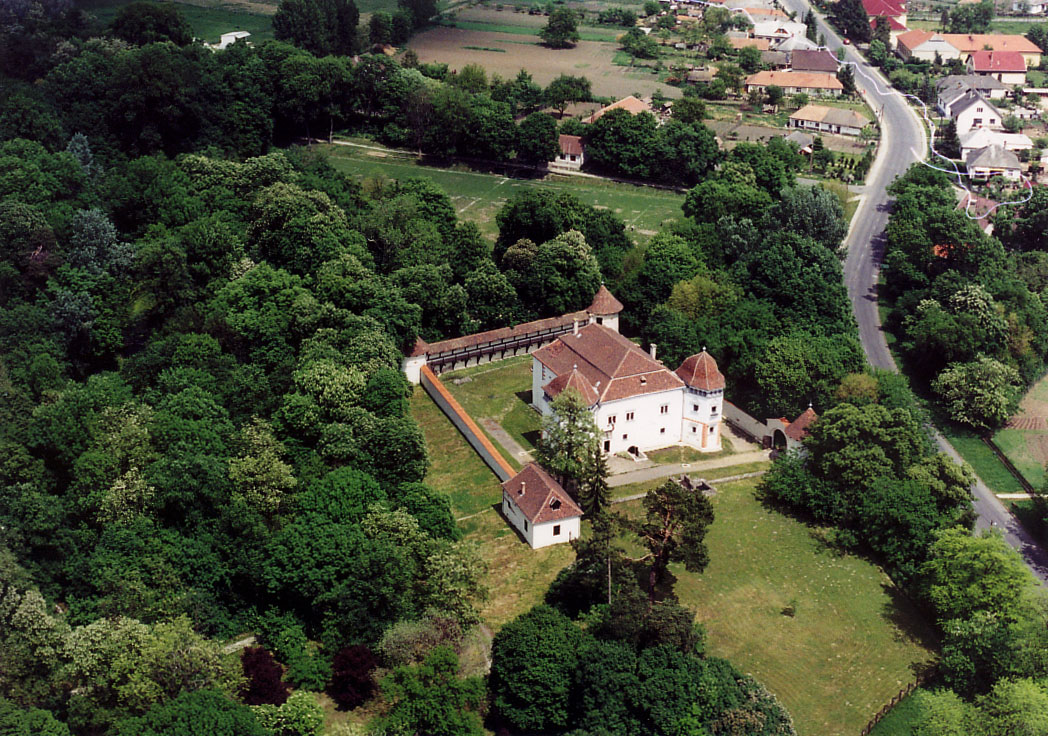
Mágóchy Castle in Pácin

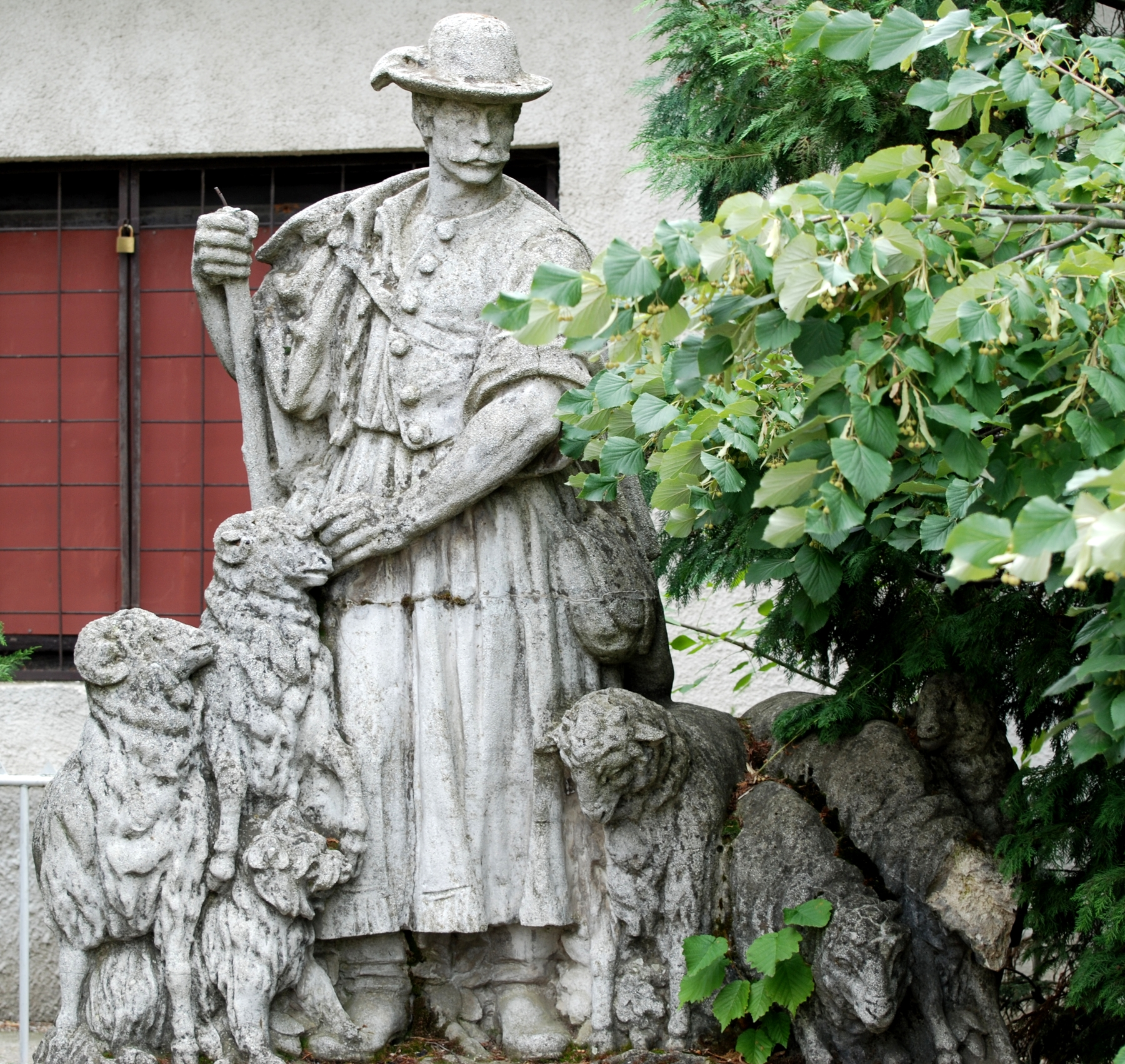
Sheperd Well (Ricse)

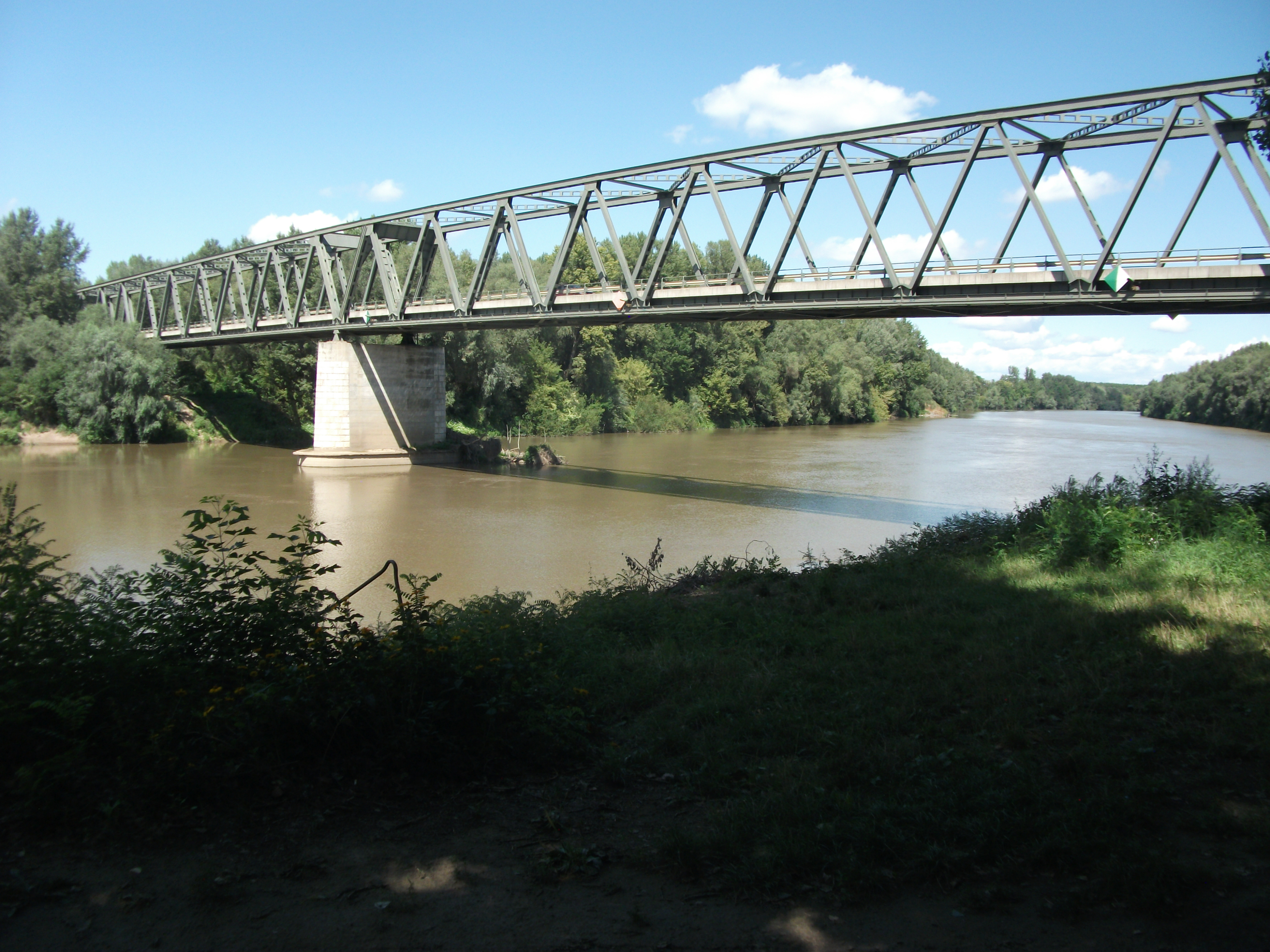
Tisza river near Cigánd

== See also ==
- List of cities and towns of Hungary
