= Kemecse =

- Town
- Flag Coat of arms

- Location within Hungary
- Coordinates: 48°04′N 21°48′E
- Country: Hungary
- County: Szabolcs-Szatmár-Bereg
- District: Kemecse

Area
  - Total: 38.94 km^{2} (15.03 sq mi)

Population (2015)
  - Total: 4,815
  - Density: 123.7/km^{2} (320/sq mi)
- Time zone: UTC+1 (CET)
  - Summer (DST): UTC+2 (CEST)
- Postal code: 4501
- Area code: (+36) 42
- Website: site.kemecse.hu

Kemecse is a town in Szabolcs-Szatmár-Bereg county, in the Northern Great Plain region of eastern Hungary.

== Geography ==
It covers an area of 60.42 km^{2} (23 sq mi) and has a population of 4815 people (2015).

== International relations ==
=== Twin towns – Sister cities ===
Kemecse is twinned with:

- Lăzarea, Romania

== Sport ==
Kemecse SE, association footbal club
