= Lácacséke =

- Village
- Flag Coat of arms

- Location of Lácacséke
- Coordinates: 48.36858°N 21.99306°E
- Country: Hungary
- Region: Northern Hungary
- County: Borsod-Abaúj-Zemplén
- District: Cigánd

Area
  - Total: 16.25 km^{2} (6.27 sq mi)

Population (1 January 2026)
  - Total: 270
  - Density: 17/km^{2} (43/sq mi)
- Time zone: UTC+1 (CET)
  - Summer (DST): UTC+2 (CEST)
- Postal code: 3967
- Area code: (+36) 47
- Website: www.lacacseke.hu

Lácacséke is a village in Borsod-Abaúj-Zemplén County in northeastern Hungary.
