= Ricse =

Village in Tokaj region of Hungary

- Large village
- Location of Borsod-Abaúj-Zemplén county in Hungary

- Location of Ricse
- Coordinates: 48.32579°N 21.96890°E
- Country: Hungary
- County: Borsod-Abaúj-Zemplén
- District: Cigánd

Area
  - Total: 24.74 km^{2} (9.55 sq mi)

Population (2004)
  - Total: 1,913
  - Density: 77.32/km^{2} (200.3/sq mi)
- Time zone: UTC+1 (CET)
  - Summer (DST): UTC+2 (CEST)
- Postal code: 3974
- Area code: (+36) 47

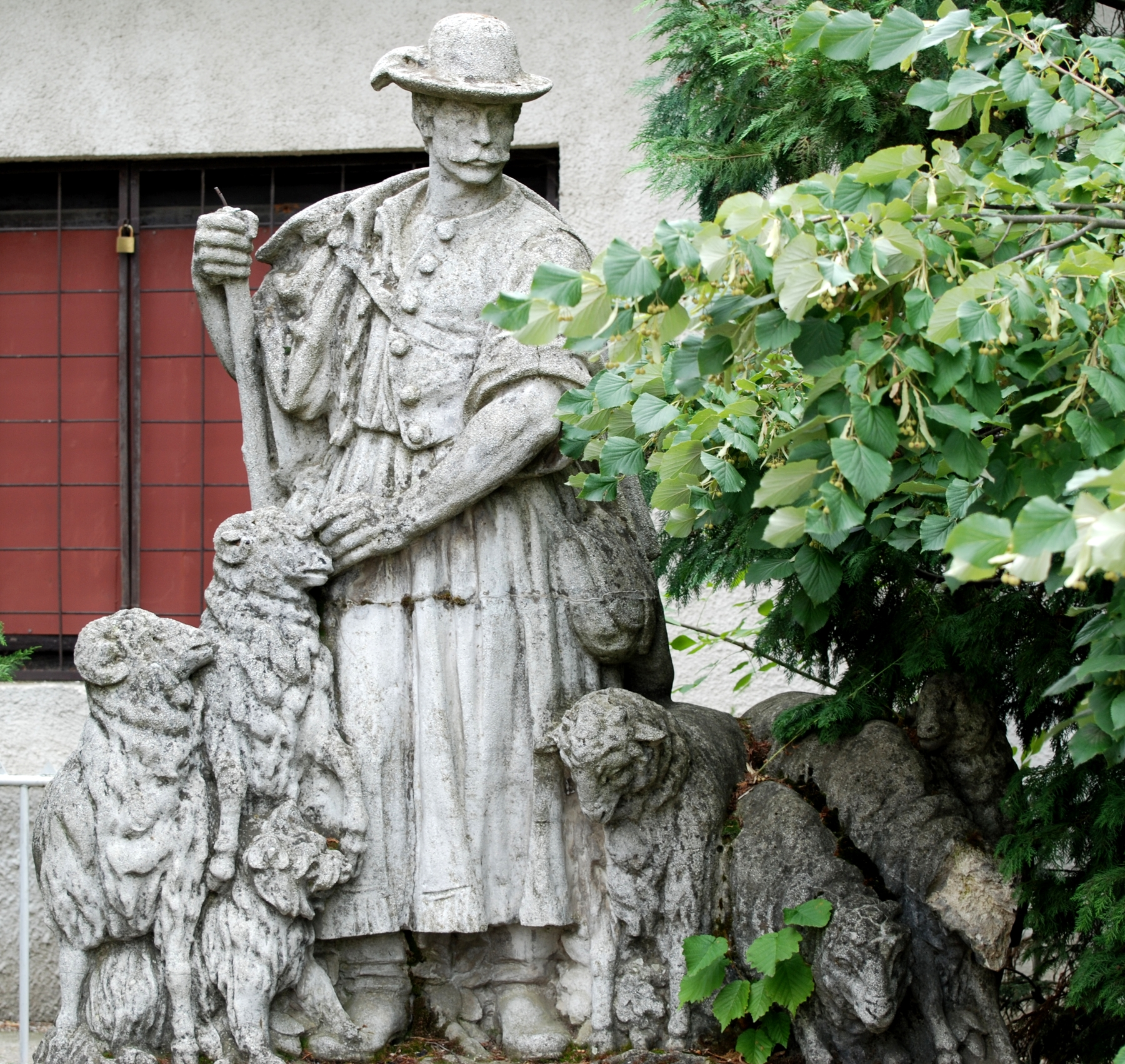
The composition at Juhász-kút (Sheperd Well) is one of the sights of Ricse. The well and its composition was donated to the village by Adolph Zukor, who was born here.

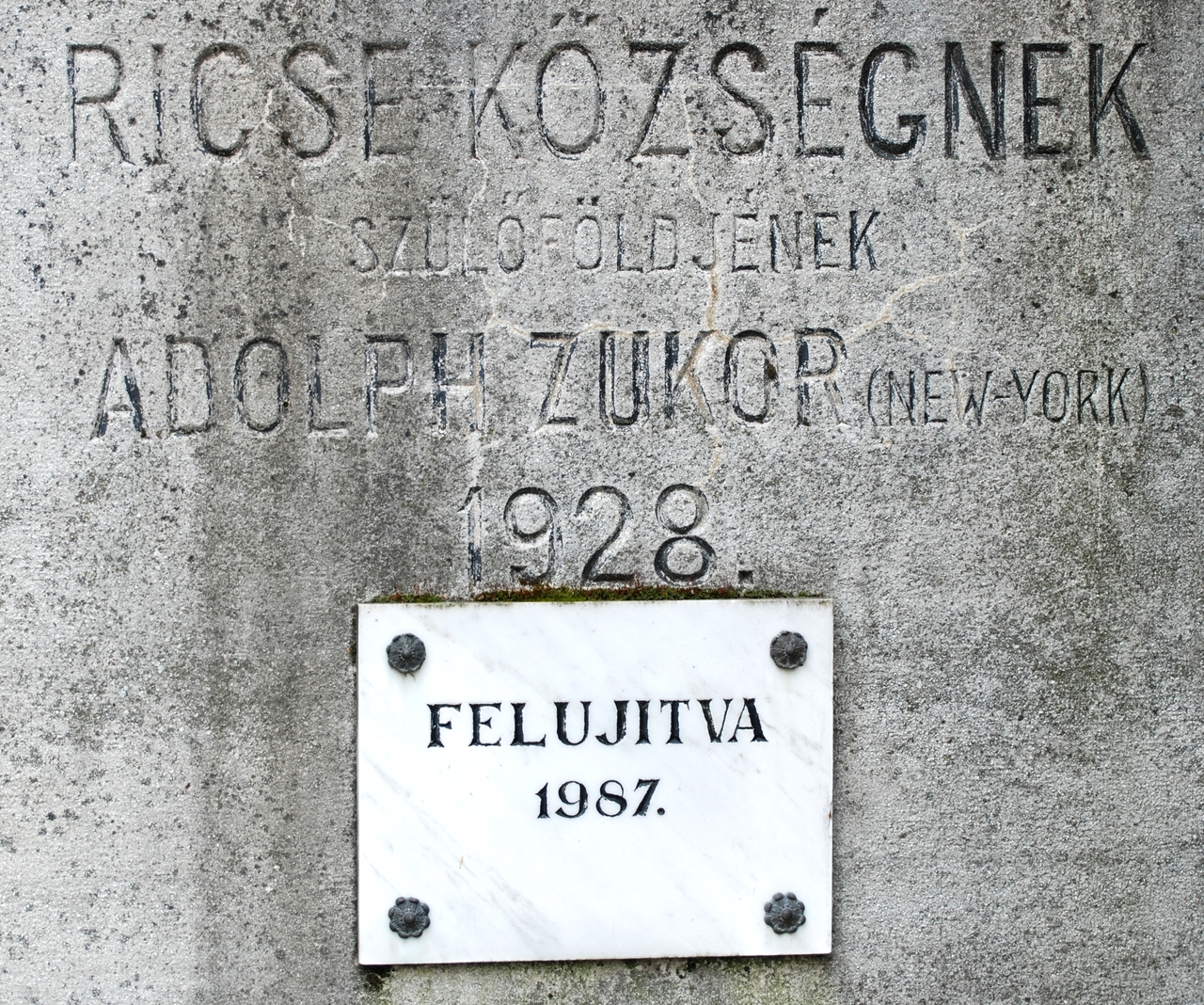
The inscription over Juhász-kút: "For the village of Ricse, for his homeland, Adolph Zukor (New York) 1928. Renovated in 1987."

Ricse (sometimes erroneously written as Risce) is a village in the Tokaj wine region in Borsod-Abaúj-Zemplén, in Eastern Hungary. Prior to World War II Ricse was home to a thriving Jewish community. The founder of Paramount Pictures, Adolph Zukor, was born in Ricse in 1873 before emigrating to the United States in 1889.

== Notable people ==
- Adolph Zukor, Hungarian-American businessman, founder of Paramount Pictures

== Ricse internment camp at World War II ==
Established in 1940, the camp at Ricse was Zemplén County's largest internment camp. Prisoners were mainly Jews from Hungary, Poland, Slovakia, and other refugees rounded up by the Hungarian authorities. Prisoners who were unable to prove their Hungarian citizenship were also interned there. The inmates included men, women, and children. The site consisted of military barracks containing sleeping quarters with cots and blankets. The camp was fenced in and guarded by armed Hungarians, possibly soldiers. In the summer of 1941, most of the internees were transferred from Ricse to Körösmező and then to Kamianets-Podilskyi in German-occupied Ukraine, where they were murdered at the end of August 1941.
