= Nagyrozvágy =

- Village
- Flag Coat of arms

- Location of Nagyrozvágy
- Coordinates: 48.34375°N 21.91956°E
- Country: Hungary
- Region: Northern Hungary
- County: Borsod-Abaúj-Zemplén
- District: Cigánd

Area
  - Total: 26.82 km^{2} (10.36 sq mi)

Population (1 January 2025)
  - Total: 578
  - Density: 21.6/km^{2} (55.8/sq mi)
- Time zone: UTC+1 (CET)
  - Summer (DST): UTC+2 (CEST)
- Postal code: 3965
- Area code: (+36) 47
- Website: nagyrozvagy.hu

Nagyrozvágy (Slovak: Veľká Rozvaď) is a village in Borsod-Abaúj-Zemplén County in northeastern Hungary.
