= Bodroghalom =

- Village
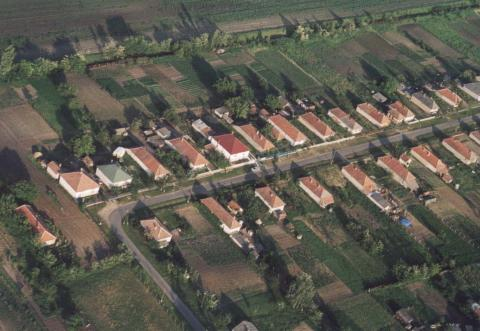

- Flag Coat of arms

- Location of Bodroghalom
- Coordinates: 48.30000°N 21.70520°E
- Country: Hungary
- Region: Northern Hungary
- County: Borsod-Abaúj-Zemplén
- District: Cigánd

Area
  - Total: 26.88 km^{2} (10.38 sq mi)

Population (1 January 2025)
  - Total: 1,142
  - Density: 42.49/km^{2} (110.0/sq mi)
- Time zone: UTC+1 (CET)
  - Summer (DST): UTC+2 (CEST)
- Postal code: 3987
- Area code: (+36) 47
- Website: www.bodroghalom.hu

Bodroghalom is a village in Borsod-Abaúj-Zemplén county, Hungary.
