= Pácin =

- Village
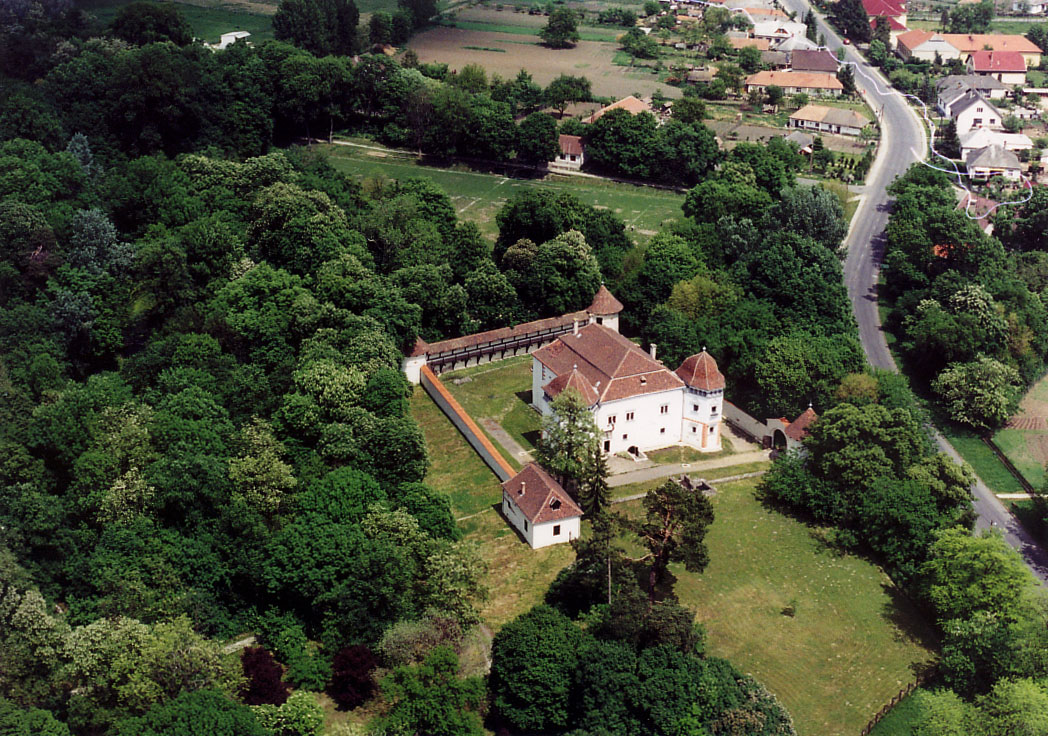

- Flag Coat of arms

- Location of Pácin
- Coordinates: 48.3309°N 21.83086°E
- Country: Hungary
- Region: Northern Hungary
- County: Borsod-Abaúj-Zemplén
- District: Cigánd

Area
  - Total: 33.92 km^{2} (13.10 sq mi)

Population (1 January 2025)
  - Total: 1,393
  - Density: 41.07/km^{2} (106.4/sq mi)
- Time zone: UTC+1 (CET)
  - Summer (DST): UTC+2 (CEST)
- Postal code: 3964
- Area code: (+36) 47
- Website: pacin.hu

Pácin is a village in Borsod-Abaúj-Zemplén County in northeastern Hungary.
