= Kisrozvágy =

- Village
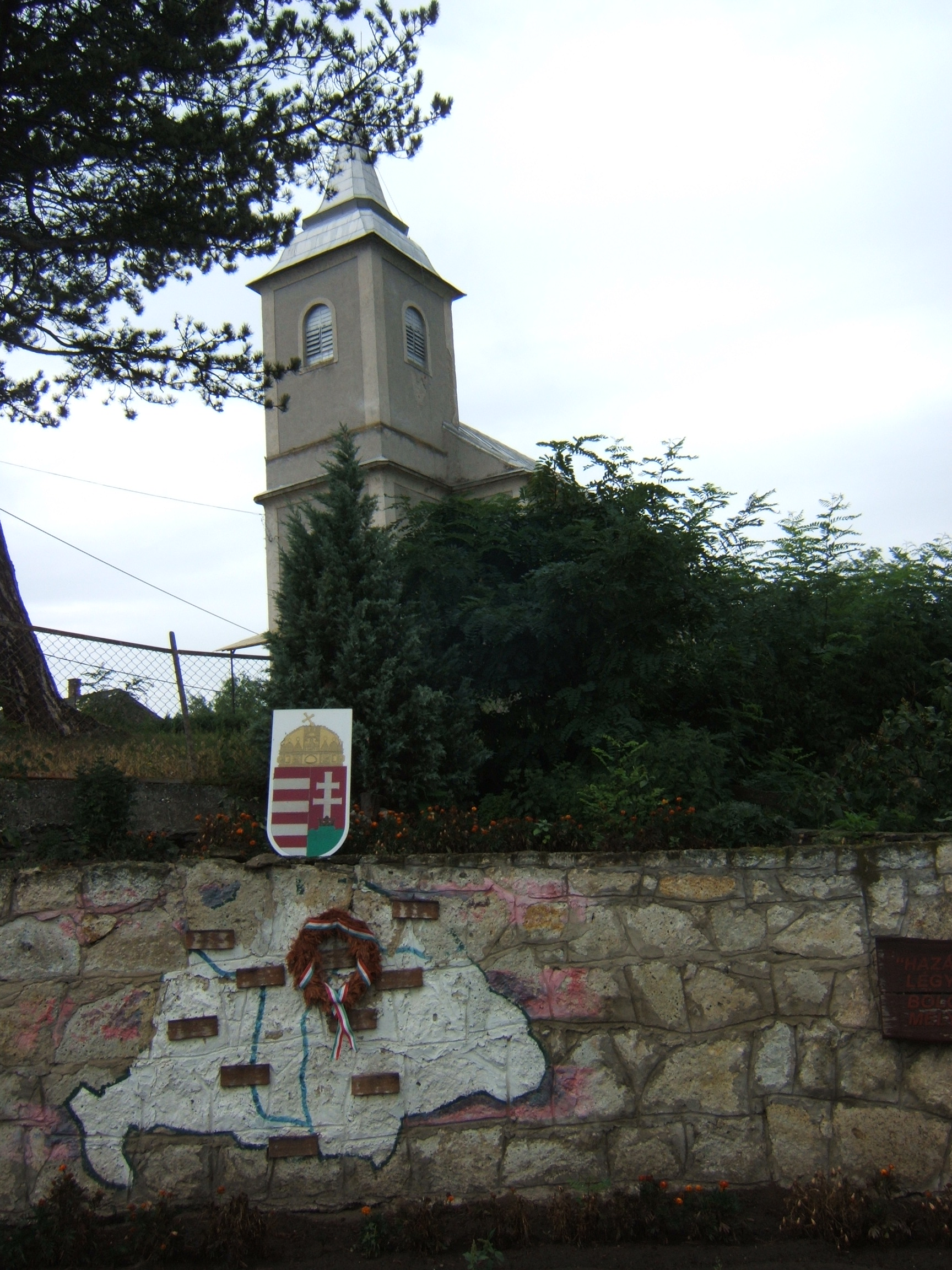

- Flag Coat of arms

- Location of Kisrozvágy
- Coordinates: 48.34673°N 21.93875°E
- Country: Hungary
- Region: Northern Hungary
- County: Borsod-Abaúj-Zemplén
- District: Cigánd

Area
  - Total: 8.34 km^{2} (3.22 sq mi)

Population (1 January 2026)
  - Total: 197
  - Density: 23.6/km^{2} (61.2/sq mi)
- Time zone: UTC+1 (CET)
  - Summer (DST): UTC+2 (CEST)
- Postal code: 3965
- Area code: (+36) 47

Kisrozvágy is a village in Borsod-Abaúj-Zemplén County in northeastern Hungary.

== Population ==
Village population
Year	Residents
1980	341
1990	244
2001	212
2011	158
2022	205
2025	193
