= Comoro =

Comoro may refer to:

- Comoro, Dom Aleixo, a village in Dom Aleixo Administrative Post, Dili Municipality, Timor-Leste
- Comoro Islands, an archipelago lying between Madagascar and the African continent
- Comoro River, on the island of Timor
- Comoro International Airport, the former name of Presidente Nicolau Lobato International Airport, the main airport of Timor-Leste
- Comoros, an island country in the Indian Ocean
  - Grande Comore, the principal island of this country

== See also ==
- Komoro (disambiguation)
