= Beszterec =

Coordinates: 48°09′23″N 21°50′17″E

- Interactive map of Beszterec
- Country: Hungary
- County: Szabolcs-Szatmár-Bereg

Area
  - Total: 11.59 km^{2} (4.47 sq mi)

Population (2001)
  - Total: 1,132
  - Density: 97.67/km^{2} (253.0/sq mi)
- Time zone: UTC+1 (CET)
  - Summer (DST): UTC+2 (CEST)
- Postal code: 4488
- Area code: 42

Location of Szabolcs-Szatmar-Bereg county in Hungary

Beszterec is a village in Szabolcs-Szatmár-Bereg county, in the Northern Great Plain region of eastern Hungary.

== Geography ==
It covers an area of 11.59 km^{2} (4 sq mi) and has a population of 1132 people (2001).
