= Krásnohorská Dlhá Lúka =

Village and municipality in Slovakia

Krásnohorská Dlhá Lúka Várhosszúrét
- Municipality
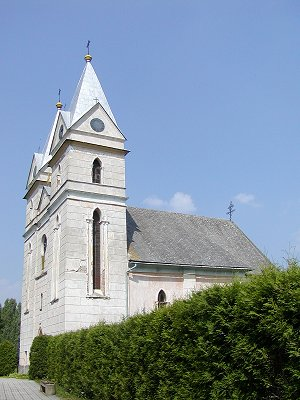

- Flag

- Location of Krásnohorská Dlhá Lúka in the Košice Region Location of Krásnohorská Dlhá Lúka in Slovakia
- Coordinates: 48.62°N 20.58°E
- Country: Slovakia
- Region: Košice Region
- District: Rožňava District
- First mentioned: 1338

Area
  - Total: 14.03 km^{2} (5.42 sq mi)
- Elevation: 308 m (1,010 ft)

Population (2025)
  - Total: 696
- Time zone: UTC+1 (CET)
  - Summer (DST): UTC+2 (CEST)
- Postal code: 494 5
- Area code: +421 58
- Vehicle registration plate (until 2022): RV
- Website: krhdlhaluka.sk

Krásnohorská Dlhá Lúka (Slovak pronunciation: [ˈkraːsnɔɦɔrskaː ˈdl̩ɦaː ˈluːka]; Hungarian: Várhosszúrét) is a village and municipality in the Rožňava District in the Košice Region of middle-eastern Slovakia.

== History ==
In historical records the village was first mentioned in 1338. Before the establishment of independent Czechoslovakia in 1918, Krásnohorská Dlhá Lúka was part of Gömör and Kishont County within the Kingdom of Hungary. From 1938 to 1945, it was again part of Hungary as a result of the First Vienna Award.

== Geography ==
The municipality lies at an altitude of 308 metres (1,010 ft) and covers an area of 14.03 km^{2} (5.42 sq mi) (2025).

== Population ==
Population statistic (10 years)
Year	1995	2005	2015	2025
Count	704	675	729	696
Difference		−4.11%	+8%	−4.52%

Population statistic
Year	2024	2025
Count	701	696
Difference		−0.71%

It has a population of 696 people (31 December 2025).

=== Ethnicity ===
Census 2021 (1+ %)
Ethnicity	Number	Fraction
Hungarian	566	80.85%
Slovak	171	24.42%
Not found out	18	2.57%
Total	700	

In year 2021 was 700 people by ethnicity 566 as Hungarian, 171 as Slovak, 18 as Not found out, 2 as Czech, 1 as Ukrainian and 1 as Rusyn.

Note on population: The difference values of population numbers in the table "Population statistic" and in the sections "Ethnicity" & "Religion" is caused by the use of various statistical methods.

=== Religion ===
Census 2021 (1+ %)
Religion	Number	Fraction
Roman Catholic Church	500	71.43%
None	98	14%
Calvinist Church	43	6.14%
Greek Catholic Church	25	3.57%
Evangelical Church	18	2.57%
Not found out	7	1%
Total	700	

In year 2021 was 700 people by religion 500 from Roman Catholic Church, 98 from None, 43 from Calvinist Church, 25 from Greek Catholic Church, 18 from Evangelical Church, 7 from Not found out, 3 from Christian Congregations in Slovakia, 3 from Other, 2 from Eastern Orthodox Church and 1 from United Methodist Church.

== Culture ==
The village has a public library and a football pitch.
