= Székely (village) =

- Coat of arms

- Location of Székely in Hungary
- Coordinates: 48.05864°N 21.93375°E
- Country: Hungary
- Region: Northern Great Plain
- County: Szabolcs-Szatmár-Bereg

Area
  - Total: 16.08 km^{2} (6.21 sq mi)

Population (2017)
  - Total: 1,043
  - Density: 64.86/km^{2} (168.0/sq mi)
- Time zone: UTC+1 (CET)
  - Summer (DST): UTC+2 (CEST)
- Postal code: 4534
- Area code: +36 42
- Website: http://szekely.hu/

Székely is a village in Szabolcs-Szatmár-Bereg county, in the Northern Great Plain region of eastern Hungary.

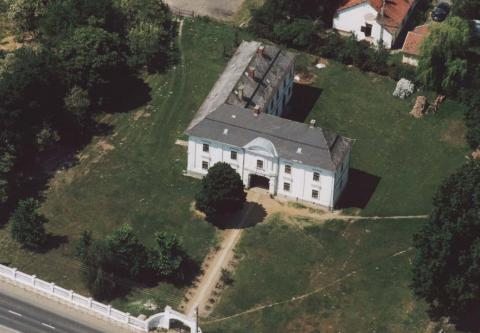

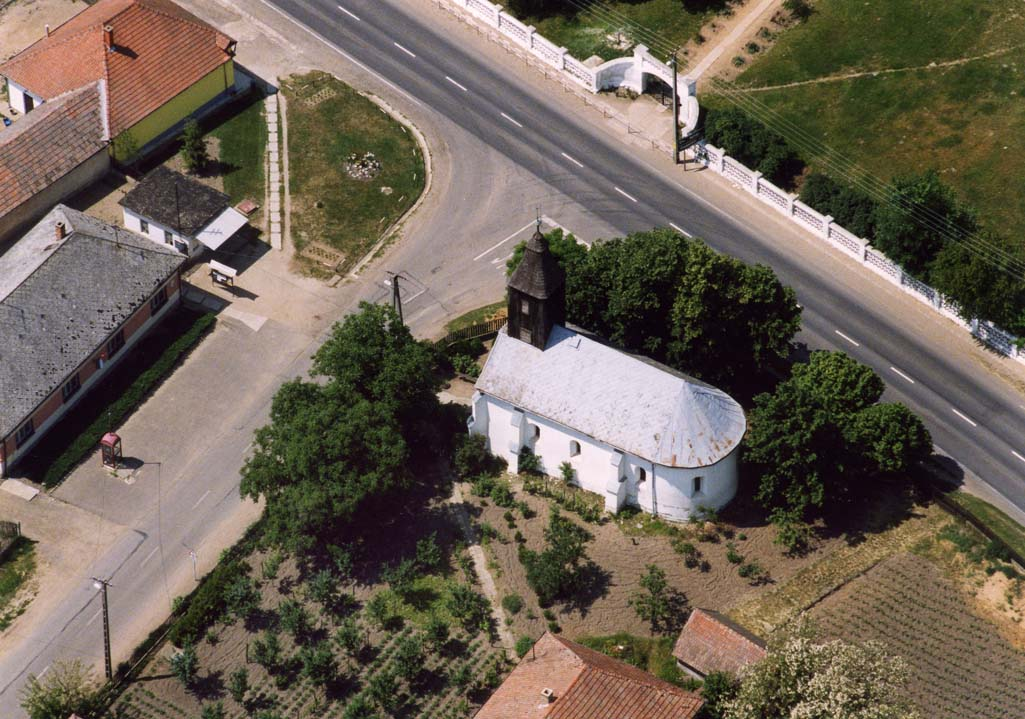

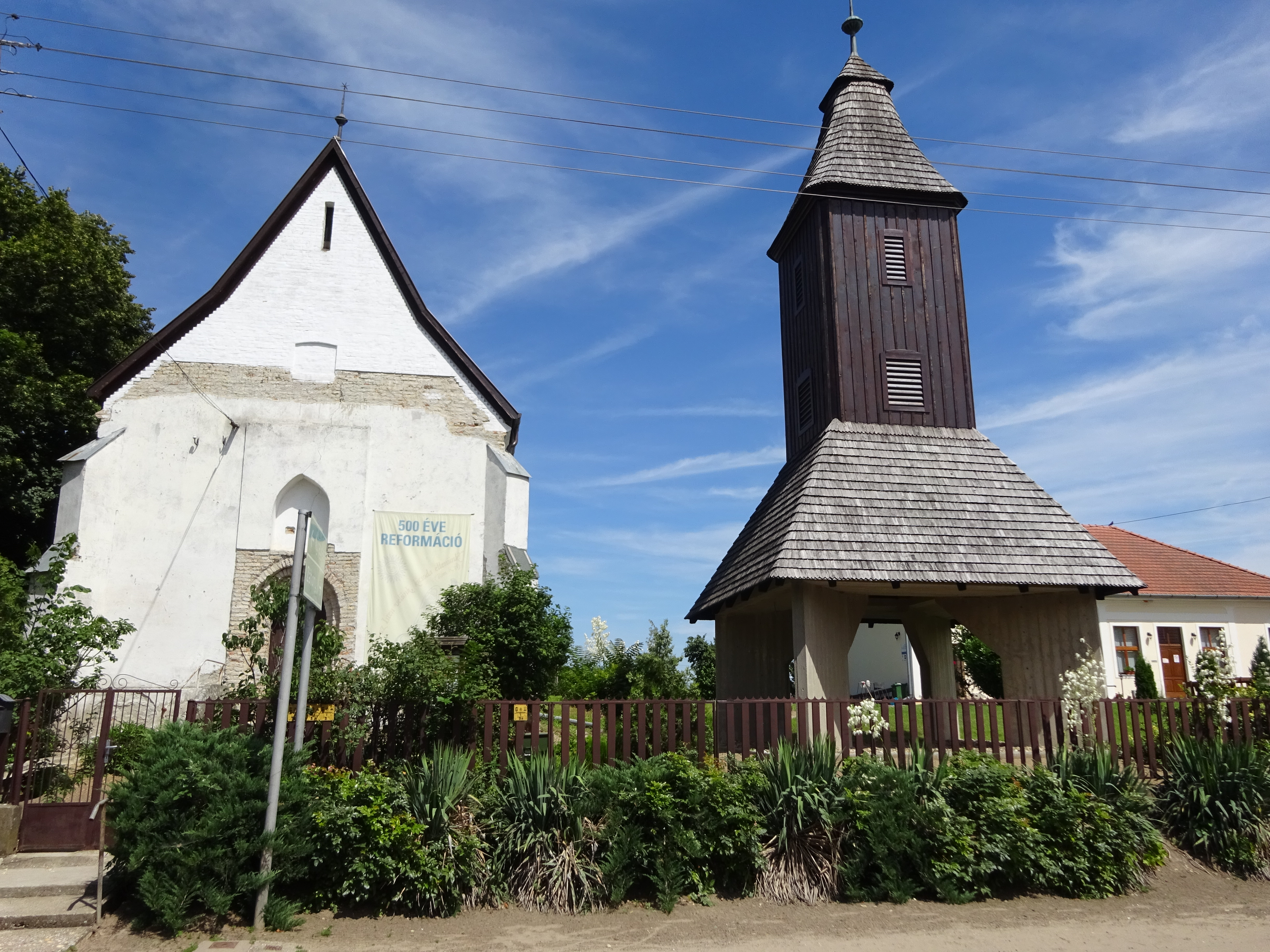

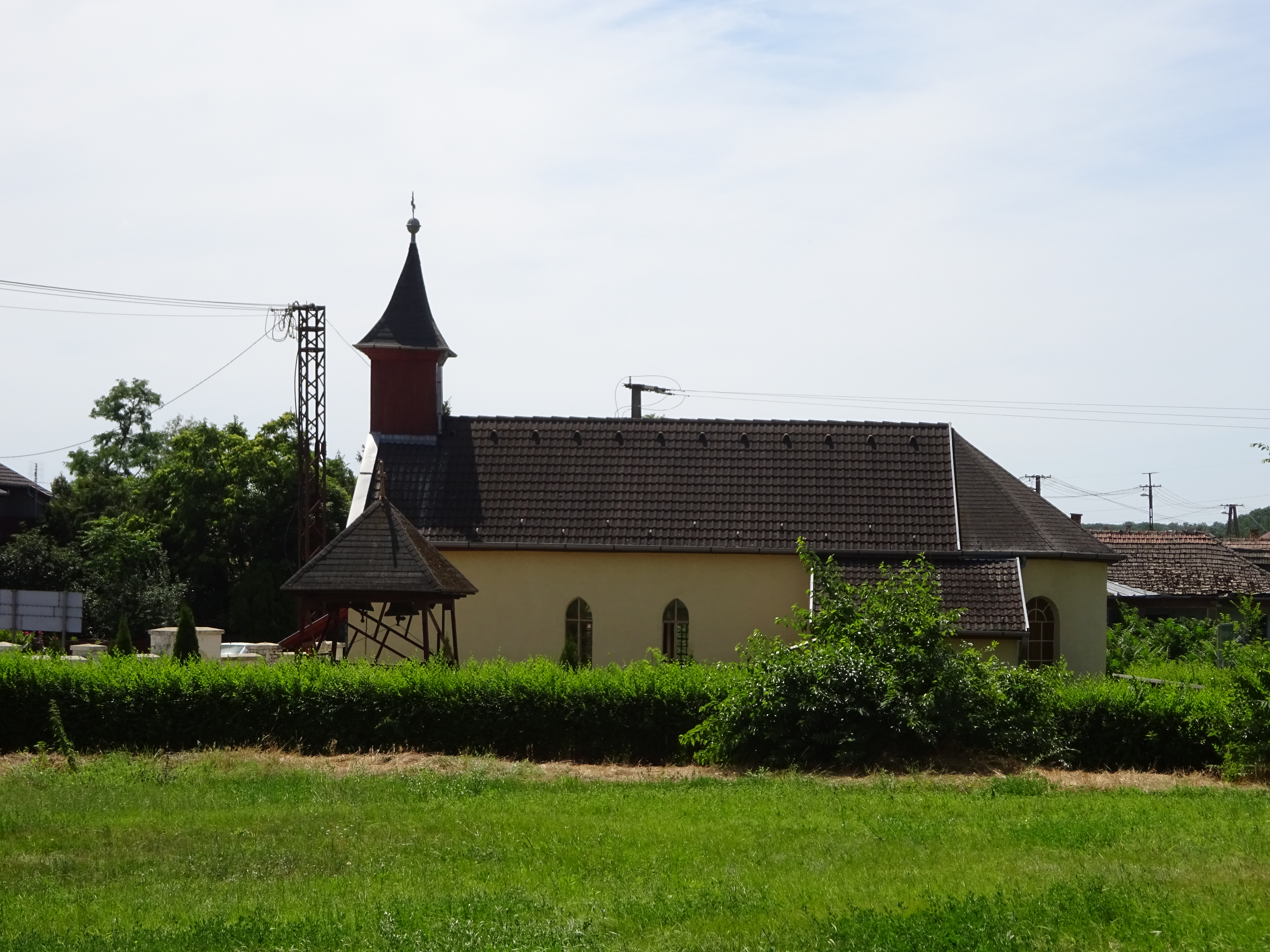

== Geography ==
It covers an area of 16.08 km^{2} (6 sq mi) and has a population of 1116 people (2001).
