= Tiszabercel =

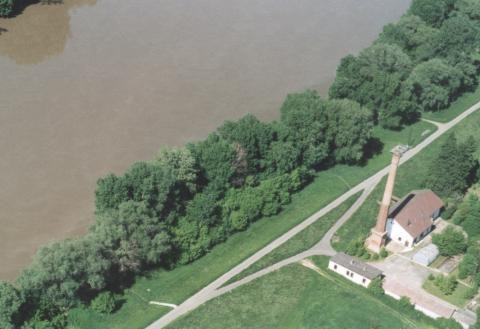
- Aerial photo from Tiszabercel

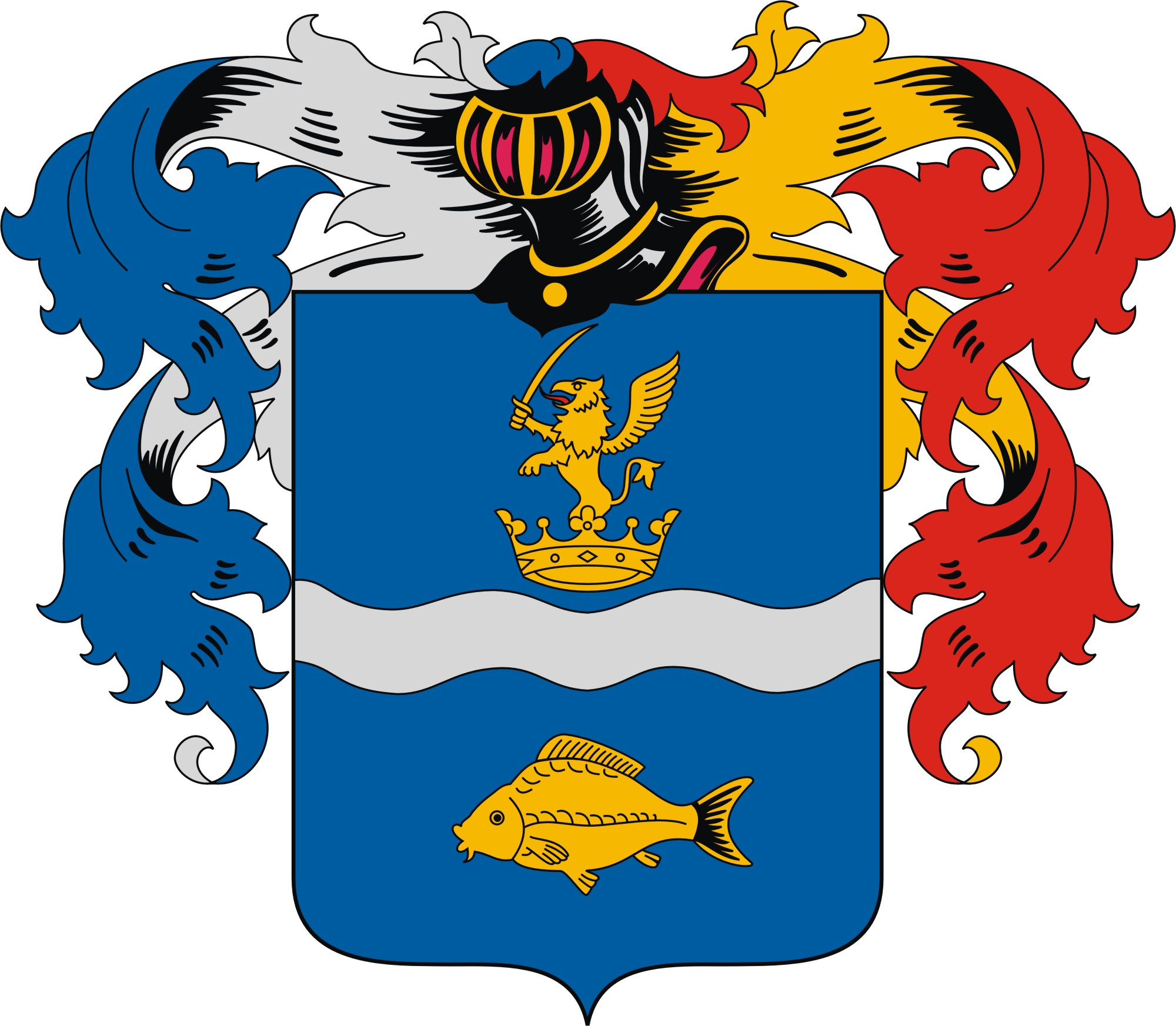
- Coat of arms

- Location of Tiszabercel in Hungary
- Coordinates: 48.15°N 21.65°E
- Country: Hungary
- Region: Northern Great Plain
- County: Szabolcs-Szatmár-Bereg

Area
  - Total: 31.38 km^{2} (12.12 sq mi)

Population (2015)
  - Total: 1,819
  - Density: 57.97/km^{2} (150.1/sq mi)
- Time zone: UTC+1 (CET)
  - Summer (DST): UTC+2 (CEST)
- Postal code: 4474
- Area code: +36 42
- Website: https://www.tiszabercel.hu/

Tiszabercel is a village in Szabolcs-Szatmár-Bereg county, in the Northern Great Plain region of eastern Hungary.

== Geography ==
It covers an area of 31.38 km^{2} (12 sq mi) and has a population of 1819 people (2015).

== History ==
Berczel's name appears in diplomas in 1335. The settlement was then the property of the Izsépi family, which gave it as dowry to a family member, János Olasz, the wife of Blessed Major. The Izzipi and Italian families shared it at the end of this century. The part of the property of the Italian family was named Egyházasbercel, the family of Izsép was called Istvánfia Berczel. It is mentioned in 1400 as the property of the Bessenyey family. In 1405 the Cselei are also written as owners of the Izsépy and Dobay families. In 1424, according to its charter, the village was named as two separate settlements: Berzel and Egyházas-Berczel under the name Tisza. In 1436 they were also owned by the Tatár and Vay families of Berczel and the Báthorians.

Until the beginning of the 19th century, it was owned by several families: Csoma, Ibrányi, Ormos, Bakó, Inczédy, Gulácsy, Bessenyey, Dombrády, Liszkay, Vida, Osváth, Boronkai, Kömmerling, and For Mozga families. At the beginning of the 20th century, Lajos Okolicsányi was the larger owner of the village.

== Notable people ==
Notable people that were born or lived in Tiszabercel include the following:

- Edith Bruck (born 1931), Hungarian writer and director
