= Fényeslitke =

Coordinates: 48°16′N 22°06′E

- Coat of arms
- Interactive map of Fényeslitke
- Country: Hungary
- County: Szabolcs-Szatmár-Bereg

Area
  - Total: 25.15 km^{2} (9.71 sq mi)

Population (2015)
  - Total: 2,407
  - Density: 95.7/km^{2} (248/sq mi)
- Time zone: UTC+1 (CET)
  - Summer (DST): UTC+2 (CEST)
- Postal code: 4621
- Area code: 45

Location of Szabolcs-Szatmar-Bereg county in Hungary

Fényeslitke is a village in Szabolcs-Szatmár-Bereg county, in the Northern Great Plain region of eastern Hungary.

== Geography ==
It covers an area of 25.15 km^{2} (10 sq mi) and has a population of 2407 people (2015).

Situated in a flatland of the river Tisza it is only 20 kilometres from the Ukrainian border in the East and 15 km from Slovakia in the North. The next bigger town is Kisvárda, centre of the subregion, some 6 km to the South.

Fényeslitke is connected in the north-south direction by a main road Nr.4 and by railway. The rail is connected to the Ukrainian stations of Chop and Batovo. A large intermodal railway terminal is being built between Fényeslitke and Komoró for transferring containers from wide-gauge rail to normal-gauge wagons or to road trucks. Its owner, the East-West Intermodal Logistics Services Plc., states it should be operational in spring 2022 and become a gateway to the new silk road, named East-West Gate Intermodal Terminal (EWG).
