= Berkesz =

Place in Hungary

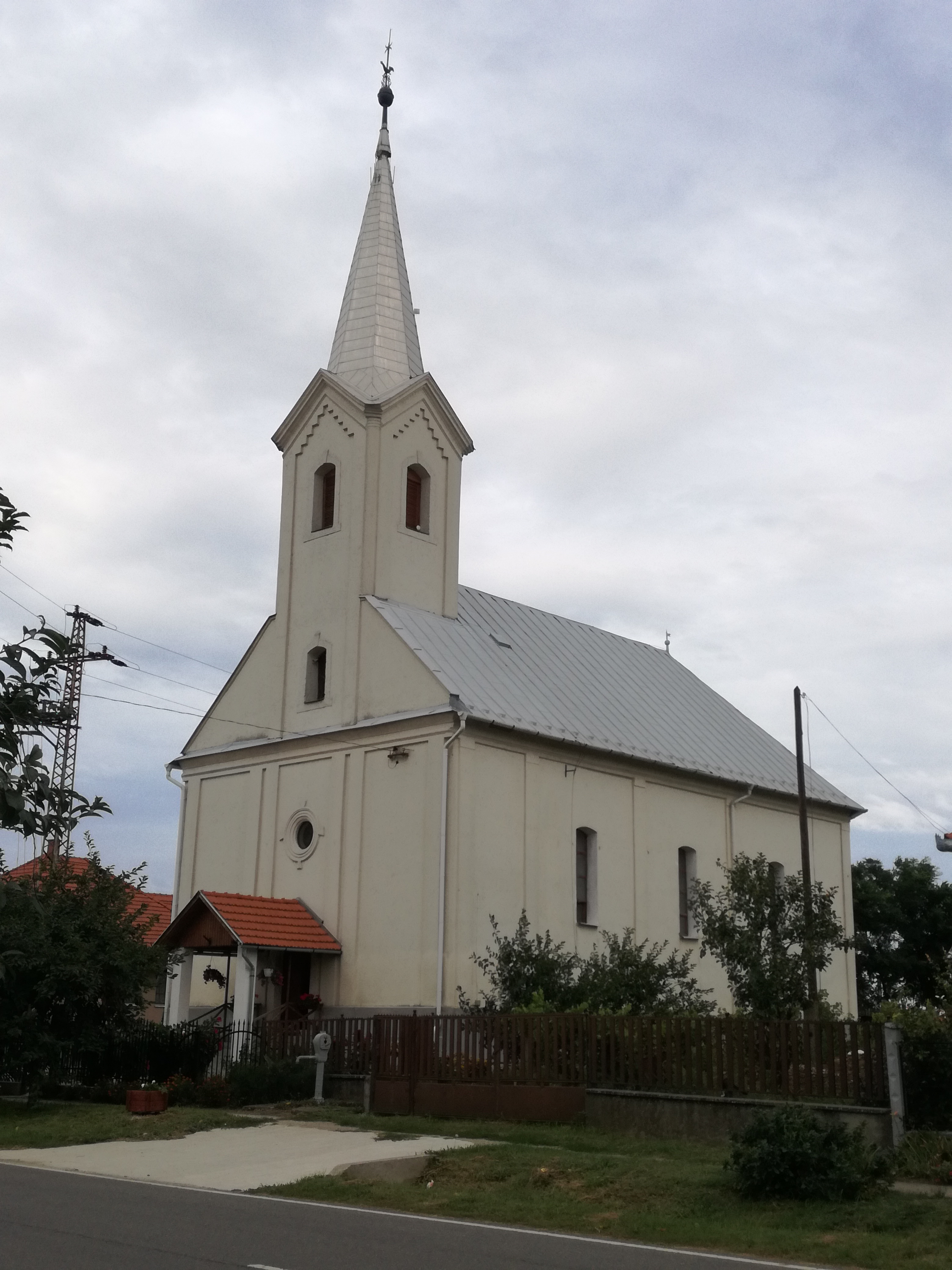

- Location of Szabolcs-Szatmar-Bereg county in Hungary

- Location of Berkesz in Hungary
- Coordinates: 48°06′N 21°59′E
- Country: Hungary
- County: Szabolcs-Szatmár-Bereg

Area
  - Total: 13.18 km^{2} (5.09 sq mi)

Population (2001)
  - Total: 955
  - Density: 72.46/km^{2} (187.7/sq mi)
- Time zone: UTC+1 (CET)
  - Summer (DST): UTC+2 (CEST)
- Postal code: 4521
- Area code: 45

Berkesz is a village in Szabolcs-Szatmár-Bereg county, in the Northern Great Plain region of eastern Hungary.

== Geography ==
It covers an area of 13.18 km^{2} (5 sq mi) and has a population of 955 people (2001).
