= Kékcse =

Coordinates: 48°15′N 22°00′E

- Interactive map of Kékcse
- Country: Hungary
- County: Szabolcs-Szatmár-Bereg

Area
  - Total: 18.23 km^{2} (7.04 sq mi)

Population (2015)
  - Total: 1,524
  - Density: 91.17/km^{2} (236.1/sq mi)
- Time zone: UTC+1 (CET)
  - Summer (DST): UTC+2 (CEST)
- Postal code: 4494
- Area code: 45

Location of Szabolcs-Szatmar-Bereg county in Hungary

Kékcse is a village in Szabolcs-Szatmár-Bereg county, in the Northern Great Plain region of eastern Hungary.

== Geography ==
It covers an area of 18.23 km^{2} (7 sq mi) and has a population of 1524 people (2015).
