= Mándok =

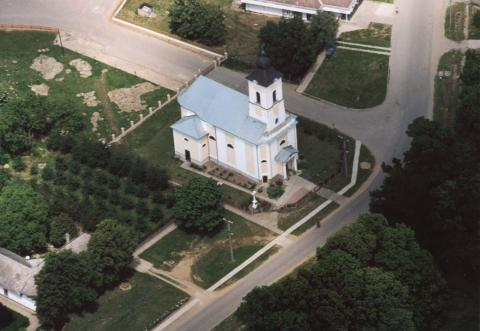
- Aerial photography of a church in Mándok

- Flag Coat of arms

- Location within Hungary
- Coordinates: 48°19′N 22°12′E
- Country: Hungary
- County: Szabolcs-Szatmár-Bereg

Area
  - Total: 28.91 km^{2} (11.16 sq mi)

Population (2015)
  - Total: 4,153
  - Density: 143.3/km^{2} (371/sq mi)
- Time zone: UTC+1 (CET)
  - Summer (DST): UTC+2 (CEST)
- Postal code: 4644
- Area code: 45

Mándok is a town in Szabolcs-Szatmár-Bereg county, in the Northern Great Plain region of eastern Hungary.

== Geography ==
It covers an area of 28.91 km^{2} (11 sq mi) and has a population of 4153 people (2015).
