= Szabolcsveresmart =

Coordinates: 48°18′N 22°01′E

- Interactive map of Szabolcsveresmart
- Country: Hungary
- County: Szabolcs-Szatmár-Bereg

Area
  - Total: 22.95 km^{2} (8.86 sq mi)

Population (2015)
  - Total: 1,690
  - Density: 73.8/km^{2} (191/sq mi)
- Time zone: UTC+1 (CET)
  - Summer (DST): UTC+2 (CEST)
- Postal code: 4496
- Area code: 45

Location of Szabolcs-Szatmar-Bereg county in Hungary

Szabolcsveresmart is a village in Szabolcs-Szatmár-Bereg county, in the Northern Great Plain region of eastern Hungary.

== Geography ==
It covers an area of 22.95 km^{2} (9 sq mi) and has a population of 1690 people (2015).
