= Komoró =

Coordinates: 48°18′N 22°07′E

- Interactive map of Komoró
- Country: Hungary
- County: Szabolcs-Szatmár-Bereg
- District: Záhony

Area
  - Total: 11.69 km^{2} (4.51 sq mi)

Population (2015)
  - Total: 1,253
  - Density: 107.3/km^{2} (278/sq mi)
- Time zone: UTC+1 (CET)
  - Summer (DST): UTC+2 (CEST)
- Postal code: 4622
- Area code: 45

Location of Szabolcs-Szatmár-Bereg County in Hungary

Komoró is a village in Záhony District of Szabolcs-Szatmár-Bereg County, in the Northern Great Plain region of eastern Hungary.

== Etymology ==
The name comes from the Slavic *komarъ (a mosquito) with the suffix -ov. 1290-1300 Komorou.

== Geography ==
It covers an area of 11.69 km^{2} (5 sq mi) and has a population of 1,253 people (2015).
