= Index of Szabolcs-Szatmár-Bereg-related articles =

A list of associated topics with Szabolcs-Szatmár-Bereg county in eastern Hungary. The list is far from complete.

== A ==
Ajak | Anarcs | Apagy | Aranyosapáti |

== B ==
Baktalórántháza | Balkány | Balsa | Barabás | Bátorliget | Benk | Beregdaróc |Beregsurány | Berkesz | Besenyőd | Beszterec |Biri | Botpalád | Bököny | Buj |

== C ==
Cégénydányád | Csaholc | Csaroda | Császló | Csegöld | Csenger | Csengersima | Csengerújfalu |

== D ==
Darnó | Demecser | Döge | Dombrád |

== E ==
Economy of Szabolcs-Szatmár-Bereg | Encsencs | Eperjeske | Érpatak |

== F ==
Fábiánháza | Fehérgyarmat | Fényeslitke | Fülesd | Fülpösdaróc |

== G ==
Gacsály | Garbolc | Gávavencsellő | Gelénes | Gemzse | Geszteréd | Géberjén | Gégény | Government of Szabolcs-Szatmár-Bereg | Gulács | Győröcske | Győrtelek | Gyulaháza | Gyügye | Gyüre |

== H ==
Hermánszeg | Hetefejércse | History of Szabolcs-Szatmár-Bereg | Hodász |

== I ==
Ibrány | Ilk |

== J ==
Jánd | Jánkmajtis | Jármi | Jéke |

== K ==
Kállósemjén | Kálmánháza | Kántorjánosi | Kék | Kékcse | Kemecse | Kérsemjén | Kisar | Kishódos | Kisléta | Kisnamény | Kispalád | Kisszekeres | Kisvarsány | Kocsord | Komlódtótfalu | Komoró | Kótaj | Kölcse | Kömörő |

== L ==
Laskod | Levelek | Lónya | Lövőpetri |

== M ==
Magosliget | Magy | Mánd | Mándok | Márokpapi | Mátyus | Mezőladány | Méhtelek | Mérk | Milota |

== N ==
Nagyar | Nagycserkesz | Nagydobos | Nagyhódos | Nagyszekeres | Nagyvarsány | Napkor | Nábrád | Nemesborzova | Nyírbéltek | Nyírbogát | Nyírbogdány | Nyírcsaholy | Nyírcsászári | Nyírderzs | Nyírgelse | Nyírgyulaj | Nyíribrony | Nyírjákó | Nyírkarász | Nyírkáta | Nyírkércs | Nyírlövő | Nyírmada | Nyírmeggyes | Nyírmihálydi | Nyírparasznya | Nyírpazony | Nyírpilis | Nyírtass | Nyírtét | Nyírtura | Nyírvasvári |

== O ==
Olcsva | Olcsvaapáti | Ököritófülpös | Ömböly | Ópályi | Őr |

== P ==
Panyola | Pap | Papos | Paszab | Pátroha | Pátyod | Penészlek | Penyige | Petneháza | Piricse | Porcsalma | Pócspetri | Pusztadobos |

== R ==
Ramocsaháza | Rápolt | Rétközberencs | Rohod | Rozsály |

== S ==
Sényő | Sonkád | Szabolcs | Szabolcsbáka | Szabolcsveresmart | Szakoly | Szamosangyalos | Szamosbecs | Szamoskér | Szamossályi | Szamosszeg | Szamostatárfalva | Szamosújlak | Székely | Szorgalmatos |

== T ==
Tarpa | Tákos | Terem | Tiborszállás | Timár | Tisza | Tiszaadony | Tiszabercel | Tiszabecs | Tiszabezdéd | Tiszacsécse | Tiszadada | Tiszadob | Tiszaeszlár | Tiszakanyár | Tiszakerecseny | Tiszakóród | Tiszamogyorós | Tiszanagyfalu | Tiszarád | Tiszaszalka | Tiszaszentmárton | Tiszatelek | Tiszavid | Tisztaberek | Tivadar | Tornyospálca |Tunyogmatolcs | Tuzsér | Túristvándi | Túrricse | Tyukod |

== U ==
Újdombrád | Újkenéz | Ura | Uszka |

== V ==
Vaja | Vállaj | Vámosatya | Vámosoroszi | Vasmegyer |

== Z ==
Zajta | Zsarolyán | Zsurk

Kisvárda | Máriapócs | Mátészalka | Nagyhalász | Nagyecsed | Nagykálló |Nyírbátor | Nyírlugos | Nyírtelek | Rakamaz | Tiszalök | Tiszavasvári | Újfehértó | Vásárosnamény | Záhony
