= Szabolcs-Szatmár-Bereg County 6th constituency =

- Constituency for the National Assembly
- Location of Szabolcs-Szatmár-Bereg county 06 within Szabolcs-Szatmár-Bereg county

- Location of Szabolcs-Szatmár-Bereg county within Hungary
- County: Szabolcs-Szatmár-Bereg County
- Population: 86,989 (2022)
- Major settlements: Nyírbátor

Current constituency
- Created: 2011
- Party: Tisza Party
- Member: Tímea Barna-Szabó
- Elected: 2026

The Szabolcs-Szatmár-Bereg County 6th parliamentary constituency is one of the 106 constituencies into which the territory of Hungary is divided by Act CCIII of 2011, and in which voters can elect one member of the National Assembly. The standard abbreviation of the constituency name is: Szabolcs-Szatmár-Bereg 06. OEVK. The seat is: Nyírbátor.

The constituency includes 33 settlements, of which 6 are urban and 27 are village or large village status. The majority of the constituency consists of small settlements.

In 2022, the constituency had a population of 86,989, and the district is characterized by a decreasing population. The number of residents eligible to vote was 70,516 in December 2025. Based on its population structure, it is mainly rural and peripheral. Based on the income data for 2022, the majority of the constituency can be classified as lower-middle-income. A district defined by those with low and medium education according to the highest completed educational level.

Between 2014 and 2026, the constituency has had a single representative, Dr. Miklós Simon (Fidesz-KDNP), who held his seat for three elections. Since 2026, the constituency has been represented by Tímea Barna-Szabó of the Tisza Party.

== Area ==
The constituency includes 33 settlements, of which 6 are urban, 4 are large-scale and 23 are village-level. The majority of the constituency consists of small settlements.

Város

1. Balkány
2. Máriapócs
3. Nagykálló
4. Nyírbogát
5. Nyírlugos
6. Újfehértó

Nagyközség

1. Kállósemjén
2. Mérk
3. Nyírbátor
4. Nyírbéltek

Község

1. Bátorliget
2. Biri
3. Bököny
4. Encsencs
5. Érpatak
6. Fábiánháza
7. Geszteréd
8. Kisléta
9. Nyírcsászári
10. Nyírderzs
11. Nyírgelse
12. Nyírgyulaj
13. Nyírkáta
14. Nyírmihálydi
15. Nyírpilis
16. Nyírvasvári
17. Ömböly
18. Penészlek
19. Piricse
20. Pócspetri
21. Szakoly
22. Terem
23. Vállaj

== Members of parliament ==
Name	Party	Term	Election
Miklós Simon	Fidesz-KDNP	2014–2026	Results of the 2014 parliamentary election:
Miklós Simon	Fidesz-KDNP	2014–2026	Results of the 2018 parliamentary election:
Miklós Simon	Fidesz-KDNP	2014–2026	Results of the 2022 parliamentary election:
Tímea Barna-Szabó	Tisza Party	2026 – present	Results of the 2026 parliamentary election: 47.91%

== Demographics ==
Historical population
Year	Pop.	±%
2011	92,992	—
2022	86,989	−6.5%

The demographics of the constituency are as follows. The population of constituency No. 6 of Szabolcs-Szatmár-Bereg County was 86,989 on October 1, 2022. The population of the constituency decreased by 6,003 between the 2011 and 2022 censuses. Based on the age composition of the constituency, the most people living in the constituency are middle-aged people with 29,740 people, while the least are elderly people with 14,137 people. 78.7% of the population of the constituency has internet access.

According to the highest level of completed education, those with primary school education are the most numerous, with 21,886 people, followed by those with a high school diploma, with 19,481 people.

According to economic activity, almost half of the population is employed, 38,333 people, the second most significant group is inactive earners, who are mainly pensioners, with 19,913 people.

The most significant ethnic group in the constituency is the Roma with 3,109 people and the Germans with 394 people. The proportion of foreign citizens without Hungarian citizenship is 0.4%.

According to religious composition, the largest religion of the residents of the constituency is Greek Catholic (16,399 people), and a significant community is the Calvinist (13,819 people). The number of those not belonging to a religious community is also significant (2,719 people), the fourth largest group in the constituency after Greek Catholic, Calvinist and Roman Catholic.

== Sources ==
- ↑ Vjt.: "2011. évi CCIII. törvény az országgyűlési képviselők választásáról". Nemzeti Jogszabálytár. Magyar Közlöny Lap- és Könyvkiadó Kft.
- ↑ KSH: "Az országgyűlési egyéni választókerületek adatai". Népszámlálás 2011. Központi Statisztikai Hivatal.
