= Szabolcs-Szatmár-Bereg County 3rd constituency =

- Constituency for the National Assembly
- Location of Szabolcs-Szatmár-Bereg county 03 within Szabolcs-Szatmár-Bereg county

- Location of Szabolcs-Szatmár-Bereg county within Hungary
- County: Szabolcs-Szatmár-Bereg County
- Population: 91,182 (2022)
- Major settlements: Kisvárda

Current constituency
- Created: 2011
- Party: Tisza Party
- Member: Viktória Dicső
- Elected: 2026

The Szabolcs-Szatmár-Bereg County 3rd parliamentary constituency is one of the 106 constituencies into which the territory of Hungary is divided by Act CCIII of 2011, and in which voters can elect one member of the National Assembly. The standard abbreviation of the constituency name is: Szabolcs-Szatmár-Bereg 03. OEVK. The seat is: Kisvárda.

The constituency includes 43 settlements, of which 6 are urban and 37 are village or large village status. The majority of the constituency consists of small settlements.

In 2022, the constituency had a population of 91,182, and the district is characterized by a decreasing population. The number of residents eligible to vote was 75,764 in December 2025. Based on its population structure, it is mainly rural and peripheral. Based on the 2022 income data, the majority of the constituency can be classified as lower-middle income. According to the highest completed educational level, it is a moderately educated district.

Between 2014 and 2026, the constituency has had a single representative, Dr. Miklós Seszták, a Fidesz-KDNP MP who has held his seat for three elections. Since 2026, the constituency has been represented by Viktória Dicső of the Tisza Party.

In terms of competitiveness, it can be described as a semi-stable ruling party (Fidesz-KDNP) constituency.

The representative of the constituency is Viktória Dicső (Tisza Party).

== Area ==
The constituency includes 43 settlements, of which 6 are urban, 1 is a large village and 36 are village-level. The majority of the constituency consists of small settlements.

Város

1. Ajak
2. Demecser
3. Dombrád
4. Kemecse
5. Kisvárda
6. Nagyhalász

Nagyközség

1. Nyírpazony

Község

1. Anarcs
2. Berkesz
3. Beszterec
4. Döge
5. Fényeslitke
6. Gégény
7. Gemzse
8. Gyulaháza
9. Jéke
10. Kék
11. Kékcse
12. Komoró
13. Lövőpetri
14. Mezőladány
15. Napkor
16. Nyírbogdány
17. Nyíribrony
18. Nyírlövő
19. Nyírtass
20. Nyírtét
21. Nyírtura
22. Pap
23. Pátroha
24. Ramocsaháza
25. Rétközberencs
26. Sényő
27. Szabolcsbáka
28. Szabolcsveresmart
29. Székely
30. Tiszakanyár
31. Tiszarád
32. Tiszatelek
33. Tornyospálca
34. Újdombrád
35. Újkenéz
36. Vasmegyer

== Members of parliament ==
Name	Party	Term	Election
Miklós Seszták	Fidesz-KDNP	2014–2026	Results of the 2014 parliamentary election:
Miklós Seszták	Fidesz-KDNP	2014–2026	Results of the 2018 parliamentary election:
Miklós Seszták	Fidesz-KDNP	2014–2026	Results of the 2022 parliamentary election:
Viktória Dicső	Tisza Party	2026 – present	Results of the 2026 parliamentary election: 50.31%

== Demographics ==
Historical population
Year	Pop.	±%
2011	97,888	—
2022	91,182	−6.9%

The demographics of the constituency are as follows. The population of the 3rd constituency of Szabolcs-Szatmár-Bereg County was 91,182 on 1 October 2022. The population of the constituency decreased by 6,706 between the 2011 and 2022 censuses. Based on the age composition, the majority of the population in the constituency is middle-aged with 32,087 people, while the least is children with 15,660 people. 81% of the population of the constituency has internet access.

According to the highest level of completed education, those with a high school diploma are the most numerous, with 23,487 people, followed by those with primary school education, with 20,806 people.

According to economic activity, almost half of the population is employed, 40,986 people, the second most significant group is inactive earners, who are mainly pensioners, with 21,519 people.

The most significant ethnic group in the constituency is the Roma with 2,540 people and the Ukrainians with 463 people. The proportion of foreign citizens without Hungarian citizenship is 0.6%.

According to religious composition, the largest religion of the residents of the constituency is the Reformed (25,478 people), and a significant community is the Roman Catholic (13,758 people). The number of those not belonging to a religious community is also significant (2,712 people), the third largest group in the constituency after the Reformed and the Roman Catholics.

== Sources ==
- ↑ Vjt.: "2011. évi CCIII. törvény az országgyűlési képviselők választásáról". Nemzeti Jogszabálytár. Magyar Közlöny Lap- és Könyvkiadó Kft.
- ↑ KSH: "Az országgyűlési egyéni választókerületek adatai". Népszámlálás 2011. Központi Statisztikai Hivatal.
