= List of populated places in Hungary (Ö–Ő) =

This is a list of cities, towns and villages of Hungary

KEY: T = Town ; V = Village

Name	Rank	County	District	Population	Post code
Öcs	V	Veszprém	Ajkai	236	8292
Őcsény	V	Tolna	Szekszárdi	2,572	7143
Öcsöd	V	Jász-Nagykun-Szolnok	Kunszentmártoni	3,723	5451
Ököritófülpös	V	Szabolcs-Szatmár-Bereg	Mátészalkai	2,015	4755
Ölbő	V	Tolna	Sárvári	761	9621
Ömböly	V	Szabolcs-Szatmár-Bereg	Nyírbátori	466	4373
Őr	V	Szabolcs-Szatmár-Bereg	Mátészalkai	1,380	4336
Őrbottyán	V	Pest	Veresegyházi	5,666	2162
Öregcsertő	V	Bács-Kiskun	Kalocsai	955	6311
Öreglak	V	Somogy	Lengyeltóti	1,728	8697
Őrhalom	V	Nógrád	Balassagyarmati	1,119	2671
Őrimagyarósd	V	Tolna	Őriszentpéteri	258	9933
Őriszentpéter	V	Tolna	Őriszentpéteri	1,309	9941
Örkény	V	Pest	Dabasi	4,978	2377
Örményes	V	Jász-Nagykun-Szolnok	Törökszentmiklósi	1,142	5222
Örménykút	V	Békés	Szarvasi	525	5556
Őrtilos	V	Somogy	Csurgói	673	8854
Örvényes	V	Veszprém	Balatonfüredi	157	8242
Ősagárd	V	Nógrád	Rétsági	343	2616
Ősi	V	Veszprém	Várpalotai	2,189	8161
Öskü	V	Veszprém	Várpalotai	2,328	8191
Öttevény	V	Győr-Moson-Sopron	Győri	2,766	9153
Öttömös	V	Csongrád	Mórahalmi	809	6784
Ötvöskónyi	V	Somogy	Nagyatádi	904	7511

== Notes ==
- Cities marked with * have several different post codes, the one here is only the most general one.
