= Tímea Barna-Szabó =

Hungarian politician

Member of the National Assembly
- Assuming office 9 May 2026
- Succeeding: Miklós Simon
- Constituency: Szabolcs-Szatmár-Bereg 6th

Personal details
- Party: Tisza

Tímea Barna-Szabó is a Hungarian politician who was elected member of the National Assembly in 2026 representing the Szabolcs-Szatmár-Bereg County 6th constituency. She previously worked as a general practitioner.
