= Erzsébet Papp =

Executed Hungarian serial killer

- Born: January 28, 1935; Penészlek, Hungary
- Died: January 23, 1962 (aged 26); Miskolc, Hungary
- Cause of death: Execution by hanging
- Other names: "The Nicotine Killer"; Mrs. János Holhos
- Conviction: Murder x4
- Penalty: Life imprisonment; resentenced to death

Details
- Victims: 4
- Span of crimes: 1957–1958
- Country: Hungary
- States: Szabolcs-Szatmár-Bereg, Borsod-Abaúj-Zemplén
- Date apprehended: 1958

Erzsébet Papp (January 28, 1935 – January 23, 1962), known as The Nicotine Killer or by her married name "Mrs. János Holhos", was a Hungarian serial killer who poisoned four people with nicotine between 1957 and 1958. She was sentenced to death and hanged in 1962.

== Early life ==
Erzsébet Papp was born on January 28, 1935, in Penészlek, one of two daughters born to farmers János and Julianna Papp (née Krivacs), who also had two sons. Erzsébet was considered an intelligent woman in comparison with her peers, but was also said to have a warped sense of morals.

== Murders ==
Papp's killings were carried out with a substance using nicotine from tobacco leaves provided by her unsuspecting brother, a fruit grower. The first victim was 5-year-old Ilona Tarnóczi in Pereces, who was a victim of opportunity. Papp was experimenting with her poison, first giving it to a dog and then mixing it in a brandy bottle, which she gave to the little girl. Tarnóczi quickly became dizzy and unable to walk, so Papp dragged her to the road, where Ilona collapsed. Police ascribed the death to drowning and closed the case.

Papp's second victim was her best friend, Mrs. József Fürtös, whom she decided to kill after Fürtös began spreading unsavory rumors about her. In an apparent attempt at reconciliation, she brought Fürtös a bottle of pálinka which she had laced with nicotine. An autopsy revealed that Fürtös had been pregnant, and her death was written off as a botched abortion attempt. Papp claimed that she had gone to her after she had had a fight with her husband, pointing to the empty pálinka bottle on the table to back up her claims.

Her third murder was her husband István Rostár, an alcoholic who verbally abused her when he was drunk. Papp twice became pregnant by István. She miscarried the first, while the second child died at three months old after falling from a hay cart. In August 1957, Rostár offered that they go to a restaurant in Lillafüred for dinner. Papp poisoned his drinks and Rostár collapsed not long after. After an autopsy, the coroner concluded that the cause of death was alcohol poisoning, citing high levels of alcohol in his blood, the smell of gastric acid, and the discoloration of the gastric mucosa as present in alcoholics.

Papp met János Holhos while working at a sovkhoz in 1959, and they married. She tried to poison him but failed, with the angry Holhos beating and then abandoning her without reporting the attempted murder. Papp began living with a Romani man, but their relationship was poorly received by her family and friends, who disowned Papp and made her sister, Mrs. Ferenc Juhos, the family heir. Papp went to Nyírbátor where her sister lived and killed her with the nicotine poison. Like the previous murders, it was not recognised as homicide at the time.

== Arrest ==
Papp's downfall came when she accidentally placed the brandy bottle on a liquor store shelf, and the shopkeeper sold it to a customer. Two people drank from it and suffered severe poisoning, but survived. The authorities discovered the nicotine in the bottle and traced its ownership to Erzsébet Papp, and her history of suspicious deaths around her. The bodies of Tarnóczi, Rostár and her sister were exhumed, and tests confirmed they had been poisoned.

Papp was arrested and charged with fourfold murder, then released due to lack of evidence. The investigation gathered witness testimony that increasingly weighed against her, and she was rearrested and charged. Initially protesting her innocence, Papp eventually broke down and confessed to all four murders. At trial, Papp was found guilty and sentenced to life imprisonment. Upon appeal to the Curia, she was resentenced to death. She was executed in Miskolc on January 23, 1962.

== See also ==
- List of serial killers by country

== Bibliography ==
- István Pinter and László Szabó (May 14, 2011). Notable crimes of the century (in Hungarian). Publio Kiadó. ISBN 978-6155116889.
