= Terem =

Terem may refer to:

- Terem (Russia), an upper story in buildings of historical Russia
- Terem Palace, a building within the Kremlin in Moscow
- Terem, Hungary, a village
- TEREM, Bulgarian arms supplier for the Bulgarian armed forces
- Terem Quartet, musical ensemble from Saint Petersburg, Russia
