= Viktória Dicső =

Hungarian politician

Member of the National Assembly
- Assuming office 9 May 2026
- Succeeding: Miklós Seszták
- Constituency: Szabolcs-Szatmár-Bereg 3rd

Personal details
- Party: Tisza

Viktória Dicső is a Hungarian politician who was elected member of the National Assembly in 2026 representing the Szabolcs-Szatmár-Bereg County 3rd constituency. She previously worked as an agricultural entrepreneur.
