= Miklós Simon =

Hungarian physicist and politician

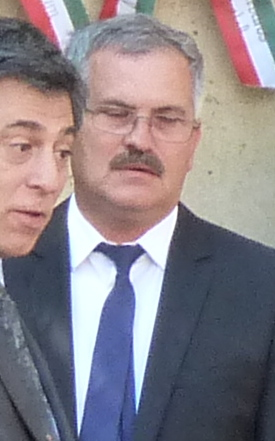
- Simon in 2014

Member of the National Assembly
- Incumbent
- Assumed office 18 June 1998
- Constituency: Szabolcs-Szatmár-Bereg County 6th constituency

Personal details
- Born: 20 January 1962 (age 64) Érpatak, Hungary
- Party: Fidesz
- Other political affiliations: FKGP (1997–2001)
- Children: 1
- Profession: physicist, politician

Miklós Simon (born 20 January 1962) is a Hungarian physicist and politician, member of the National Assembly (MP) for Nyírbátor (Szabolcs-Szatmár-Bereg County Constituency VI) from 1998 to 2006 and since 2010. He was also MP from the Szabolcs-Szatmár-Bereg County Regional List of the Fidesz between 2006 and 2010.

== Biography ==
Simon finished his secondary studies in the Benedictine Secondary Grammar School and College in the Pannonhalma Archabbey. He graduated in physics from Kossuth Lajos University in Debrecen in 1985. He received his degree as a secondary school teacher in 1996. In 1985, he joined the vacuum physics group of the Nuclear Research Institute of the Hungarian Academy of Sciences (MTA) in Debrecen as an assistant researcher, where his area of research was mass spectrometer development. From 1994 until 1996, he taught in a primary school in Nyírbogát. Later he worked as a non-staff lecturer at the College of Health Sciences in Nyíregyháza, a part of the Faculty of Medicine at Debrecen. He received his doctoral degree in 1995. He has been a member of the Hungarian Chemical Society since 1996 and of the Benedictine Students' Association since 1998. He has been on the presidium of the Bogát 2000 Sports Association since 1999.

In 1997 he joined the Nyírbogát branch of the Independent Smallholders, Agrarian Workers and Civic Party (FKGP). Later he became an adviser and, in 1998, vice president of the party's Szabolcs-Szatmár-Bereg County branch. He was elected president of the branch in 2001. In the same year, his party membership was suspended.

He secured a seat in the National Assembly during the 1998 parliamentary election, representing Nyírbátor. A mayoral candidate, he was elected to the Assembly of Nyírbogát in the local elections in 1998. He became mayor of Nyírbogát in the local by-elections on 1 July 2001. As an MP, he became an alternate member of the Hungarian delegation to the Council of Europe and the NATO Parliamentary Assembly. He is a regular member of the parliamentary conference of the Central European Initiative. He was elected incumbent MP in his Nyírbátor constituency on 21 April 2002. In May 2002, he joined the Committee on Defence and the Committee on Social and Family Affairs. He was re-elected mayor of Nyírbogát on 20 October 2002. In the general election held in 2006, he was elected from the Fidesz's Szabolcs-Szatmár-Bereg County Regional List. He was elected member of the Defence and Internal Security Committee on 30 May 2006. Simon is vice-chairman of that committee since 2014. He was succeeded by his wife as mayor of Nyírbogát in 2014.
