= Szabolcs (name) =

Male First Name

Szabolcs (Hungarian: [ˈsɒbolt͡ʃ]) is an ancient Hungarian male name, probably of Hungarian or Hunnic origin. It is not known where the name derives from. The name is still very popular, its namesday is July 28.

Szabolcs was one of the leaders of the Magyars, the nephew or brother of Árpád, he was also known as Zoboleh. He is also said to have been the second great leader of the Magyars. His power center was the now unimportant village Szabolcs, where earthen ramparts from this age have been excavated. His people settled in the area known as Szabolcs county. According to Györffy György, Arpad was succeeded by Zoboleh as the Grand Prince.

Some of the oldest attestations of the name are to be found in the founding charter of the Dömös abbey (A dömösi prépostság adománylevele) (1138/1329): sobolci and in Anonymus' Gesta Hungarorum: zobolchu (12th/13th century).

== People with given name ==
- Szabolcs Bakos (born 1987), Hungarian footballer
- Szabolcs Balajcza (born 1979), Hungarian footballer
- Szabolcs Baranyi (1944–2016), Hungarian tennis player
- Szabolcs Barna (born 1996), Hungarian footballer
- Szabolcs Bátori (born 2002), Hungarian artistic gymnast
- Szabolcs Bíró (born 1969), Hungarian footballer
- Szabolcs Bóna (born 1975), Hungarian farmer and politician
- Szabolcs Cseh (1942–2014), Romanian actor
- Szabolcs Csorba (born 1991), Hungarian football player
- Szabolcs Czira (born 1951), Hungarian politician
- Szabolcs Detre (born 1947), Hungarian sailor
- Szabolcs Dusinszki (born 2005), Hungarian footballer
- Szabolcs Fazakas (born 1947), Hungarian politician and Member of the European Parliament
- Benedek Szabolcs Fekete (born 1977), Hungarian Catholic prelate
- Szabolcs Fényes (1912–1986), Hungarian composer
- Szabolcs Gál (born 1992), Hungarian footballer
- Szabolcs Gyánó (born 1980), Hungarian footballer
- Szabolcs Hajdu (born 1972), Hungarian actor and film director
- Szabolcs Huszti (born 1983), Hungarian footballer
- Szabolcs Izsák (1944–1993), Hungarian sailor
- Szabolcs Kanta (born 1982), Hungarian footballer
- Szabolcs Kemenes (born 1986), Hungarian football player
- Szabolcs Kerék-Bárczy (born 1971), Hungarian politician and economist
- Szabolcs Kilyén (born 1998), Romanian footballer
- Szabolcs Kókay (born 1976), Hungarian illustrator, wildlife artist and nature painter
- Szabolcs Mánya (born 1989), Romanian futsal player
- Szabolcs Mezei (born 2000), Hungarian football player
- Szabolcs Pál (born 1988), Hungarian football player
- Szabolcs Pásztor (1959–2022), Hungarian fencer
- Szabolcs Perenyi (born 1982), Romanian born Hungarian footballer
- Szabolcs Sáfár (born 1974), Hungarian footballer
- Szabolcs Sándor (born 1973), Hungarian conductor, accompanist, and pianist
- Szabolcs Schimmer (born 1984), Hungarian footballer
- Szabolcs Schindler (born 1974), Hungarian footballer
- Szabolcs Schön (born 2000), Hungarian footballer
- Szabolcs Szabó (born 1979), Hungarian geographer and politician
- Szabolcs Szalay (born 2002), Hungarian footballer
- Szabolcs Szegletes (born 1978), Hungarian footballer
- Szabolcs Székely (born 1985), Romanian footballer
- Szabolcs Szilágyi (born 2003), Romanian footballer
- Szabolcs Szöllősi (born 1989), Hungarian handballer
- Szabolcs Szőllősi (born 1986), Hungarian long track speed skater
- Szabolcs Thuróczy (born 1971), Hungarian actor
- Szabolcs Törő (born 1983), Hungarian handballer
- Szabolcs Udvari (born 1974), Hungarian footballer
- Szabolcs Üveges (born 1991), Hungarian footballer
- Szabolcs de Vajay (1921–2010), Hungarian historian and genealogist
- Szabolcs Varga (born 1995), Hungarian footballer
- Szabolcs Vida (fl. 2000–2004), former Hungarian motorcycle speedway rider
- Szabolcs Vidrai (born 1977), Hungarian figure skater
- Szabolcs Weöres (born 1973), Hungarian offshore sailor
- Szabolcs Zubai (born 1984), Hungarian handballer

== See also ==
- Szabolcs (disambiguation)
