= Jármi =

Coordinates: 47°58′N 22°15′E

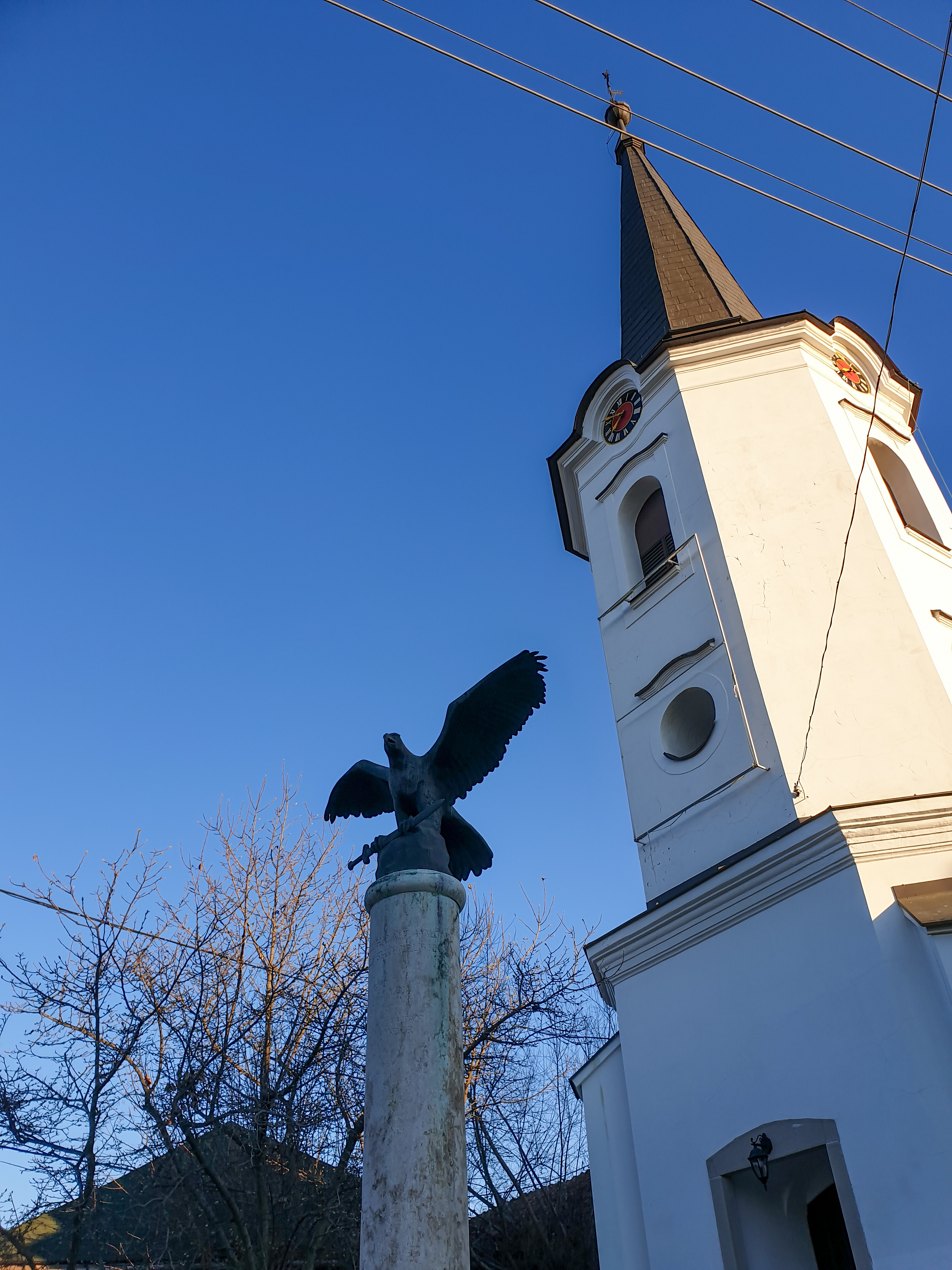
- Interactive map of Jármi
- Country: Hungary
- County: Szabolcs-Szatmár-Bereg

Area
  - Total: 2.2 km^{2} (0.85 sq mi)

Population (2015)
  - Total: 1,301
  - Density: 112.97/km^{2} (292.6/sq mi)
- Time zone: UTC+1 (CET)
  - Summer (DST): UTC+2 (CEST)
- Postal code: 4337
- Area code: 44

Location of Szabolcs-Szatmar-Bereg county in Hungary

Jármi is a village in Szabolcs-Szatmár-Bereg county, in the Northern Great Plain region of eastern Hungary.

== History ==
When first mentioned in 1325, it was the property of the Karászi family, but in 1335, the widow of Pál Magyar donated it to the Clarisses of Óbuda. Later, it became part of the united village under the name Mátészalka. By the end of the 14th century, it was mentioned as part of the emerging Csaholyi estate. In 1388, Sebestyén Csaholyi granted it to his familiars, the sons of Miklós Balog, for their services. The grant recipients later identified themselves as Jármi residents. However, the Csaholyi family still retained part of it. In 1547, Imre's daughter, Anna, and Melith György received the Csaholyi portion. In the 17-18th centuries, it had multiple co-owners through royal grants. In 1695, a total of 25 families lived in the village, with 19 being landowners. Around 1850, it was a characteristic small noble village, with the Kulin and Tatay families as prominent landowners. The population was 738 at that time. In 1870, 733 individuals lived in 145 houses, covering an area of 2215 cadastral acres. In 1910, 704 people resided in 139 houses.

=== Jewish history ===
There were Jewish residents as early as 1810. Later on, Elek Fényes, in 1851, mentions 52 Jewish residents, while Samu Borovszky, in his work from 1907, reports 99 Jews. 87 Israelites are mentioned in 1920. During World War I, out of the 16 deceased in the village, three were Jewish: Sámuel Grünfeld, Márton Weisz, and Hermann Weisz. In 1919, martyrs Károly Szécsi and József Weisz died; the incident occurred as they were traveling from Őr towards Nyíregyháza when, approaching Őr and Jármi, they turned back. They encountered the advancing Romanian troops and, when asked if there were Red Army soldiers or Székelys in Őr, the two young men - whether consciously or unconsciously - replied in the negative. The Romanians proceeded, and upon their return, they shot at the group from Őr. The two young men were arrested, taken to Tarnai-tag, and executed along with 28 others.

59 Jews lived in Jármi in 1941. In 1944, the following families were taken to the Mátészalka ghetto and then to Auschwitz: Ignác Schwartz, a tanner, and his family (father and 5 children); Ignác Bláz, a saddler, and his family (father, mother, and 4 children); Sámuel Klein, a farmer, and his wife; Ferenc Daszkál, a grain merchant, and his family (wife and 3 children); Sámuel Feier, a farmer, and his family (wife and 4 adult children); Lipót Katz, a farmer, and his family (wife and 2 children); József Inslick, a saddler and farmer, and his family (3 adults); Mór Weisz, a grain merchant and farmer, and his family (father and 4 children); Özv. Spitzer and her 3 adult daughters (seamstresses) and son-in-law; Emil Grósz, a cobbler, and his family (wife and 5 children); Jenő Jogovits, a farmer, and his wife; Jenő Vogel's wife with two adult children.

Nine individuals returned after the Holocaust, but they did not settle in the village but emigrated instead.

== Geography ==
It covers an area of 11.95 km^{2} (5 sq mi) and has a population of 1301 people (2015).
