= Szabolcs =

Szabolcs may refer to:

- Szabolcs-Szatmár-Bereg, current administrative unit (county) of Hungary
- Szabolcs (village) in Hungary's Szabolcs-Szatmár-Bereg county
- Szabolcs (county), the historical administrative unit of the Kingdom of Hungary
- Szabolcs (chieftain), the second captain, one of the seven chieftains of the Hungarians
- Szabolcs (name), Hungarian given name
  - List of people with the given name Szabolcs

== See also ==
- Economy of Szabolcs-Szatmár-Bereg
- Geography of Szabolcs-Szatmár-Bereg
- History of Szabolcs-Szatmár-Bereg
- Index of Szabolcs-Szatmár-Bereg-related articles
