= Szorgalmatos =

Coordinates: 47°58′N 21°22′E

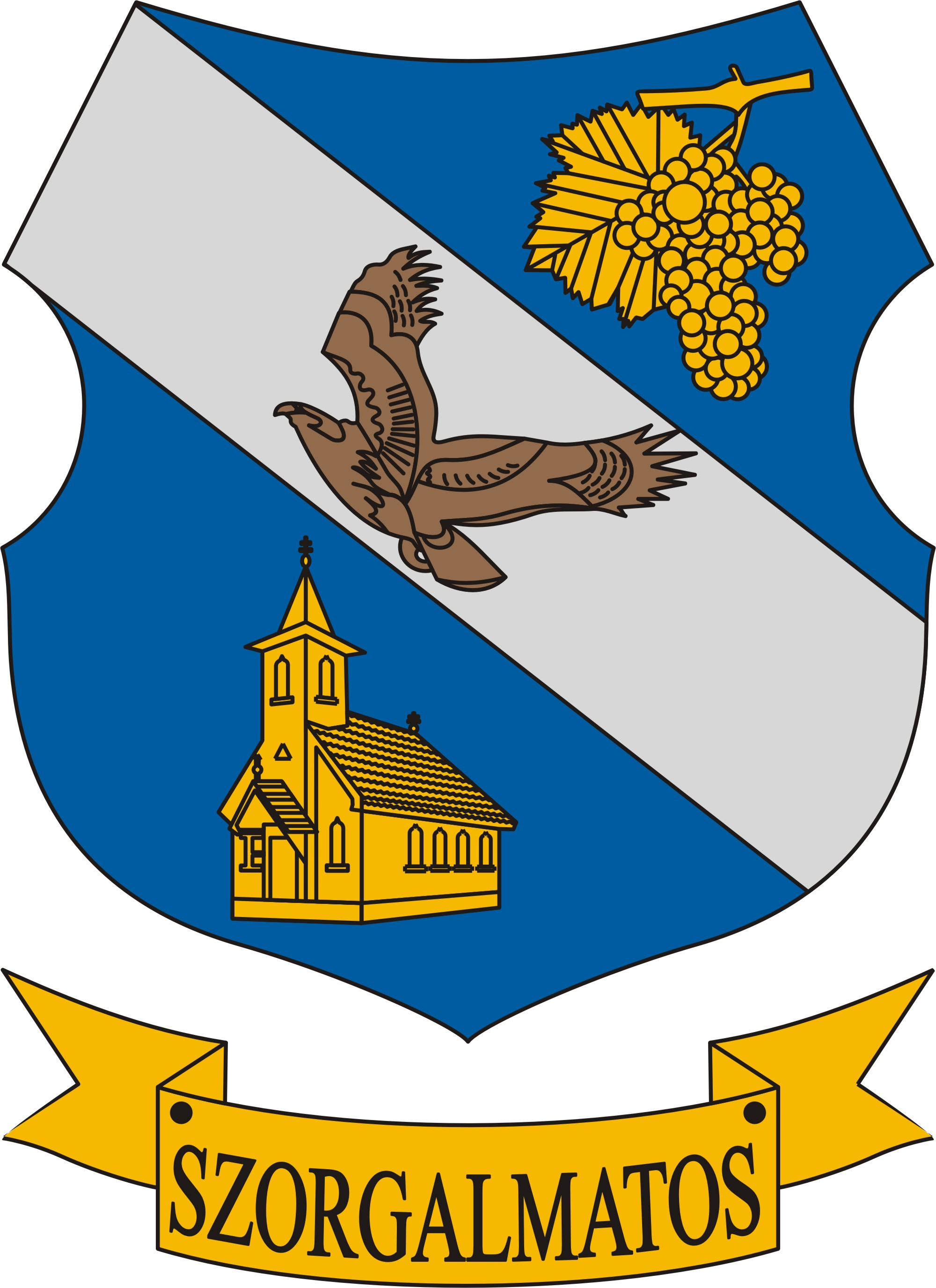
- Coat of arms
- Interactive map of Szorgalmatos
- Country: Hungary
- County: Szabolcs-Szatmár-Bereg

Area
  - Total: 10.38 km^{2} (4.01 sq mi)

Population (2015)
  - Total: 1,091
  - Density: 129.1/km^{2} (334/sq mi)
- Time zone: UTC+1 (CET)
  - Summer (DST): UTC+2 (CEST)
- Postal code: 4441
- Area code: 42

Location of Szabolcs-Szatmar-Bereg county in Hungary

Szorgalmatos is a village in Szabolcs-Szatmár-Bereg county, in the Northern Great Plain region of eastern Hungary.

== Geography ==
It covers an area of 10.38 km^{2} (4 sq mi) and has a population of 1091 people (2015).
