= Kisvarsány =

Coordinates: 48°09′N 22°18′E

- Interactive map of Kisvarsány
- Country: Hungary
- County: Szabolcs-Szatmár-Bereg

Area
  - Total: 12.83 km^{2} (4.95 sq mi)

Population (2015)
  - Total: 1,030
  - Density: 80.2/km^{2} (208/sq mi)
- Time zone: UTC+1 (CET)
  - Summer (DST): UTC+2 (CEST)
- Postal code: 4811
- Area code: 45

Location of Szabolcs-Szatmar-Bereg county in Hungary

Kisvarsány is a village in Szabolcs-Szatmár-Bereg county, in the Northern Great Plain region of eastern Hungary.

Jews lived in Kisvarsány for many years until they were murdered in the Holocaust

== Geography ==
It covers an area of 12.83 km^{2} (5 sq mi) and has a population of 1030 people (2015).
