= Újdombrád =

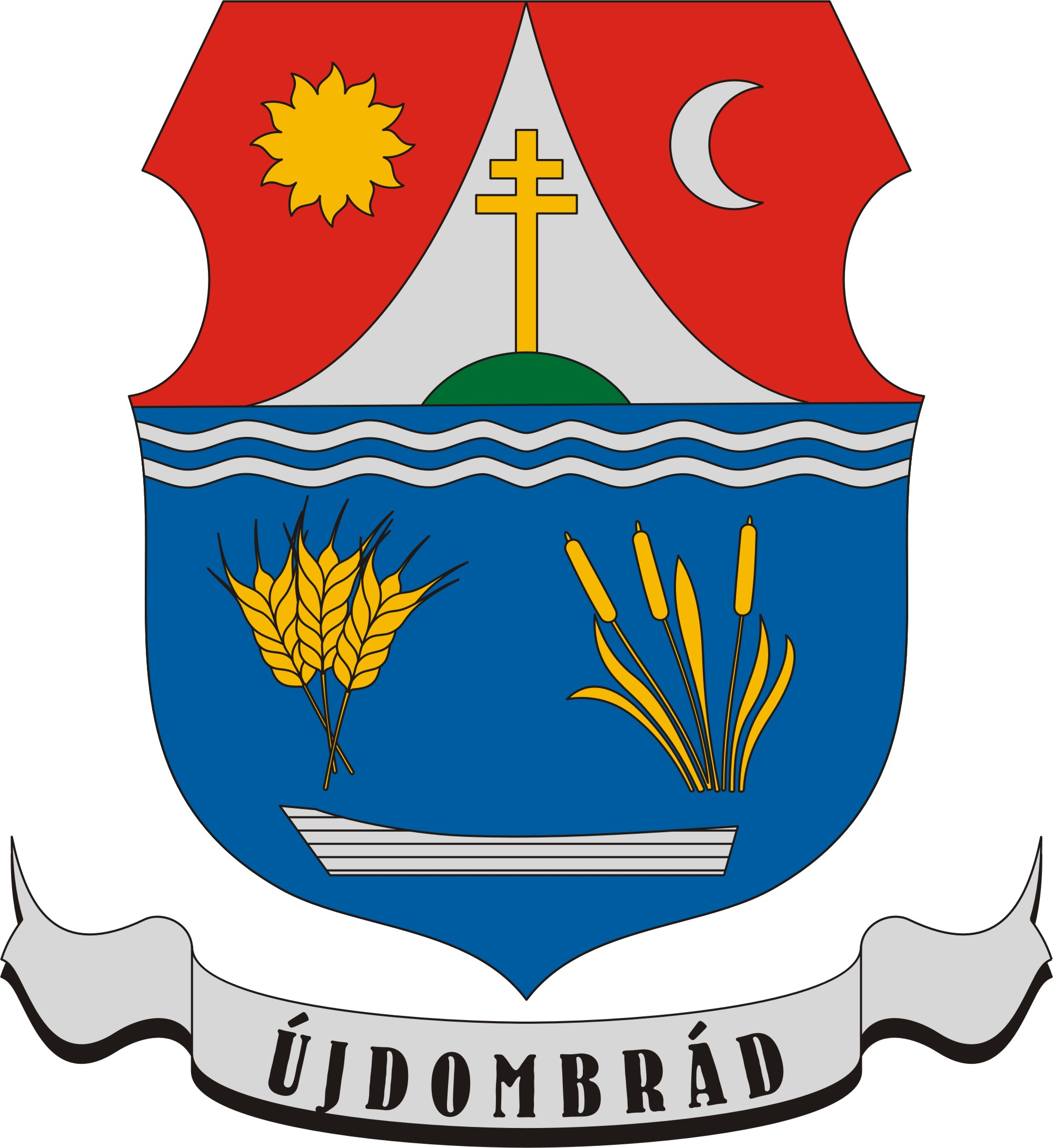
- Coat of arms

- Location of Újdombrád in Hungary
- Coordinates: 48.23°N 21.93°E
- Country: Hungary
- Region: Northern Great Plain
- County: Szabolcs-Szatmár-Bereg

Area
  - Total: 10.78 km^{2} (4.16 sq mi)

Population (2012)
  - Total: 660
  - Density: 61/km^{2} (160/sq mi)
- Time zone: UTC+1 (CET)
  - Summer (DST): UTC+2 (CEST)
- Postal code: 4490
- Area code: +36 45
- Website: http://ujdombrad.hu/

Újdombrád is a village in Szabolcs-Szatmár-Bereg county, in the Northern Great Plain region of eastern Hungary. It is located in Rétköz, 5 km southwest of Dombrád and 32 km northeast of Nyíregyháza. It can be approached by road on inferior roads.

== Geography ==
It covers an area of 10.78 km^{2} (4 sq mi) and has a population of 693 people (2002).

== History ==
In the south-western part of the Dombrád border, two Borgászka and Karkhalom homesteads were prominent in the marshy landscape, higher than their surroundings. In the area between the two homesteads, the construction of residential houses began to take place at the turn of the 1900s, and families living in the surrounding homesteads (Dombóc, Ferenczy, Veress and Tóth homesteads) began to settle. The Nyírvidéki Small Railway, handed over from Nyíregyháza to Dombrád in 1905, which played an important role in the life of the whole Rétköz, generated the formation of a unified settlement. Almost at the same time as the railway, the largest distillery in the region was built on the Karkhalom farm. A II. By the end of World War II, today's settlement structure had developed. From 1962, the settlement operated as a council branch of the village of Dombrád, which still had a resident population of over 1,000 during this period. Accordingly, the primary school also operated with 8 classes. In 1962, a house of culture was built in the center of the settlement, which later housed and operated the cinema, and to this day houses the general practitioner's office and, most recently, the pharmacy. Due to the continuous population decline, from 1975 only the lower grades were taught locally. In the early 1980s, a drinking water network was built, as well as a rainwater network that cleared much of the interior. In the early 1990s, the roads were paved, and the gas and telephone networks were built. Until the liquidation of the distillery in 1992, it provided a livelihood for 20-30 families. The light rail was shut down in 2009.

As the largest farm in the county, Újdombrád was part of Dombrád until 1988, and since January 1, 1989 it has been an independent settlement.
