= Tiszanagyfalu =

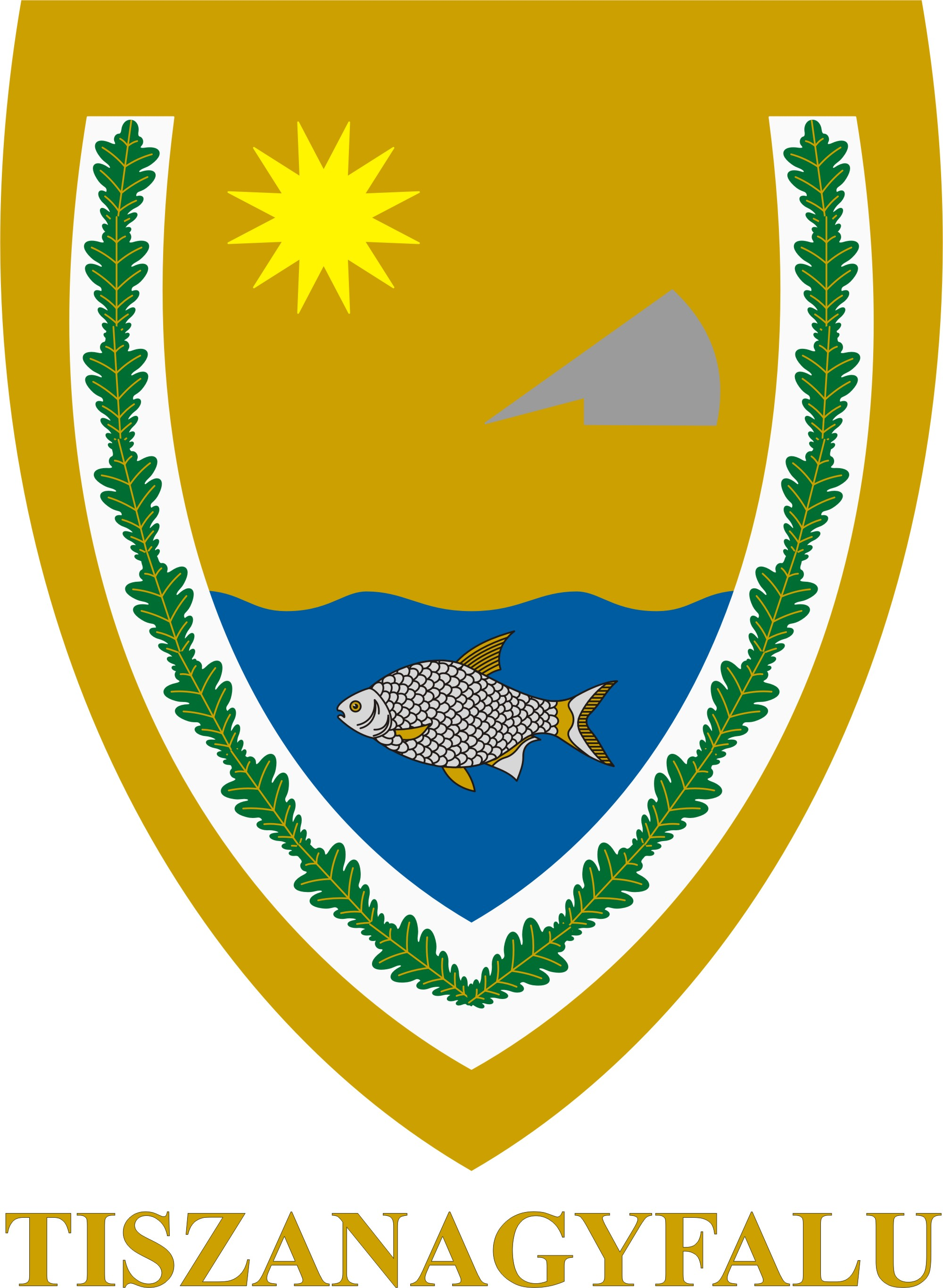
- Coat of arms

- Location of Tiszanagyfalu in Hungary
- Coordinates: 48.092°N 21.472°E
- Country: Hungary
- Region: Northern Great Plain
- County: Szabolcs-Szatmár-Bereg

Area
  - Total: 27.05 km^{2} (10.44 sq mi)

Population (2015)
  - Total: 1,804
  - Density: 66.69/km^{2} (172.7/sq mi)
- Time zone: UTC+1 (CET)
  - Summer (DST): UTC+2 (CEST)
- Postal code: 4463
- Area code: +36 42
- Website: https://tiszanagyfalu.hu/

Tiszanagyfalu is a village in Szabolcs-Szatmár-Bereg county, in the Northern Great Plain region of eastern Hungary.

== Geography ==
It covers an area of 27.05 km^{2} (10 sq mi) and has a population of 1804 people (2015).

== History ==
Its name refers to its size. The name of the settlement occurs in written memories from the 13th century. In the middle of the 13th century, it was the property of Villa Magna and the castle estate of Szabolcs. The settlement was destroyed during the Tartar invasion, because the Tartars burned and destroyed the villages on the left bank of the Tisza.

In 1245 IV. King Béla donated the uninhabited land, formerly belonging to the castle of Szabolcs, to Stephen of the Gutkeled family.

It was listed in the papal tithe at the beginning of the 15th century as Nagfalu, which had a church and a priest.

In 1342 it was owned by the monastery of Bistrița, but earlier it belonged to the Dersé of the genus Hontpázmány.

During the 14th century we know of several landowners named after this place. According to a charter dated 19 May 1364, in front of the Eger chapter, members of the Nogfalu family shared the parishionary church there, named after the Virgin Mary.

It was owned by Báthory in 1353, Baktay in 1420, Rohody in 1444, Farkas in Bogdány in 1451, Tuzséry in 1445 and Szabolcs Csűry in 1463 and the Lasztóczky family.

In 1459, the elves of Lees also mention Eghazas Nagfalu.

In the 15th century, the Téthy and Jékey families also owned it, although in other cases it may be a property close to Nyírtét.

The former monastic land estate may have existed in the 15th century, at least in part of the village, because in 1465 it was mentioned as Újfalu, alio nomine Apáthszeg.

Its boundary was described by a charter from 1347; a ruined castle is also mentioned as a sign during the border crossing. This time the grandson of Batthyán Szalók and Lukács of Újfalus were registered. In the middle of the 16th century, it belonged to György Téthy, but it could also have been owned by another, because in 1565 the estate of Ferenc Horváth was occupied by the chief captain of Ferenc Zay. In 1556 it had 69 serfs who paid tears, so it had a population of about 345–350. In the second half of the 16th century, it was referred to as Nagfalu and Újfalu, but it was always the same place; the owners of Téthy and Csomaközy Boldizsár 13 and Rózsa Gáspár 7 serfs lived here. It was held by the Csomaközy in the 17th century, but in 1683 it was donated to Captain Gergely Hatházi, a believer in Imre Thököly.

For the most part in the 18th century, Samuel Patay owned and, to some extent, populated him. In 1756, the Bónis family from Tolcsva acquired it from Samuel with a change of estate. Then the village is resettled. (Register of the Reformed Church) It was later divided among about 20 noble families, with a population of 900-950 around the liberation of serfs. At the end of the 18th century and the beginning of the 19th century, it was in the hands of the Bekény, Bónis, Máriássy, Csoma, Klobusiczky families, the Szemere, Jármy families, the Bernáth, Majer, Korda, Somos and Pózer families. The village was completely destroyed by a flood in 1888. An estate called Dicse merged into today's border at the meeting point of the border between Nagyfalu and Eszlár; the estate is mentioned in the border crossing of 1347. At the beginning of the 19th century, the pregnant Samuel was the favorite poet of the Arrow Cross. The village has been called Tiszanagyfalu since 1908. In the 1930s, the settlement is characterized by a strip-filled, originally one-street road village near the Tisza, in the open field. Its main street (now Kossuth Street), which is part of the "Tisza Road", is N-S. The village has expanded east since the turn of the century. The plots are single-row. The folk architecture of the house was characterized by a three-part, side porch. The kitchen is divided into two by an arch. The oven in the room was heated from the bottom of the free chimney. The rooms are ground floor. The thatched roof with thatched roof and thatched roof has an upper truncated roof towards the street.
