= Szamoskér =

Coordinates: 48°01′N 22°25′E

- Interactive map of Szamoskér
- Country: Hungary
- County: Szabolcs-Szatmár-Bereg

Area
  - Total: 9.71 km^{2} (3.75 sq mi)

Population (2015)
  - Total: 400
  - Density: 41.2/km^{2} (107/sq mi)
- Time zone: UTC+1 (CET)
  - Summer (DST): UTC+2 (CEST)
- Postal code: 4721
- Area code: 44

Location of Szabolcs-Szatmar-Bereg county in Hungary

Szamoskér is a village in Szabolcs-Szatmár-Bereg county, in the Northern Great Plain region of eastern Hungary.

== Geography ==
It covers an area of 9.71 km^{2} (4 sq mi) and has a population of 400 people (2015).
