= Tiszaadony =

Village in Hungary

Coordinates: 48°14′N 22°18′E

Location of Szabolcs-Szatmar-Bereg county in Hungary

Tiszakanyár is a village in Szabolcs-Szatmár-Bereg county, in the Northern Great Plain region of eastern Hungary.

== Geography ==
It covers an area of 15.63 km^{2} (6 sq mi) and has a population of 655 people (2015).

== History ==
The name Tiszaadony (Adony) was first mentioned in diplomas in 1290 as Odon.

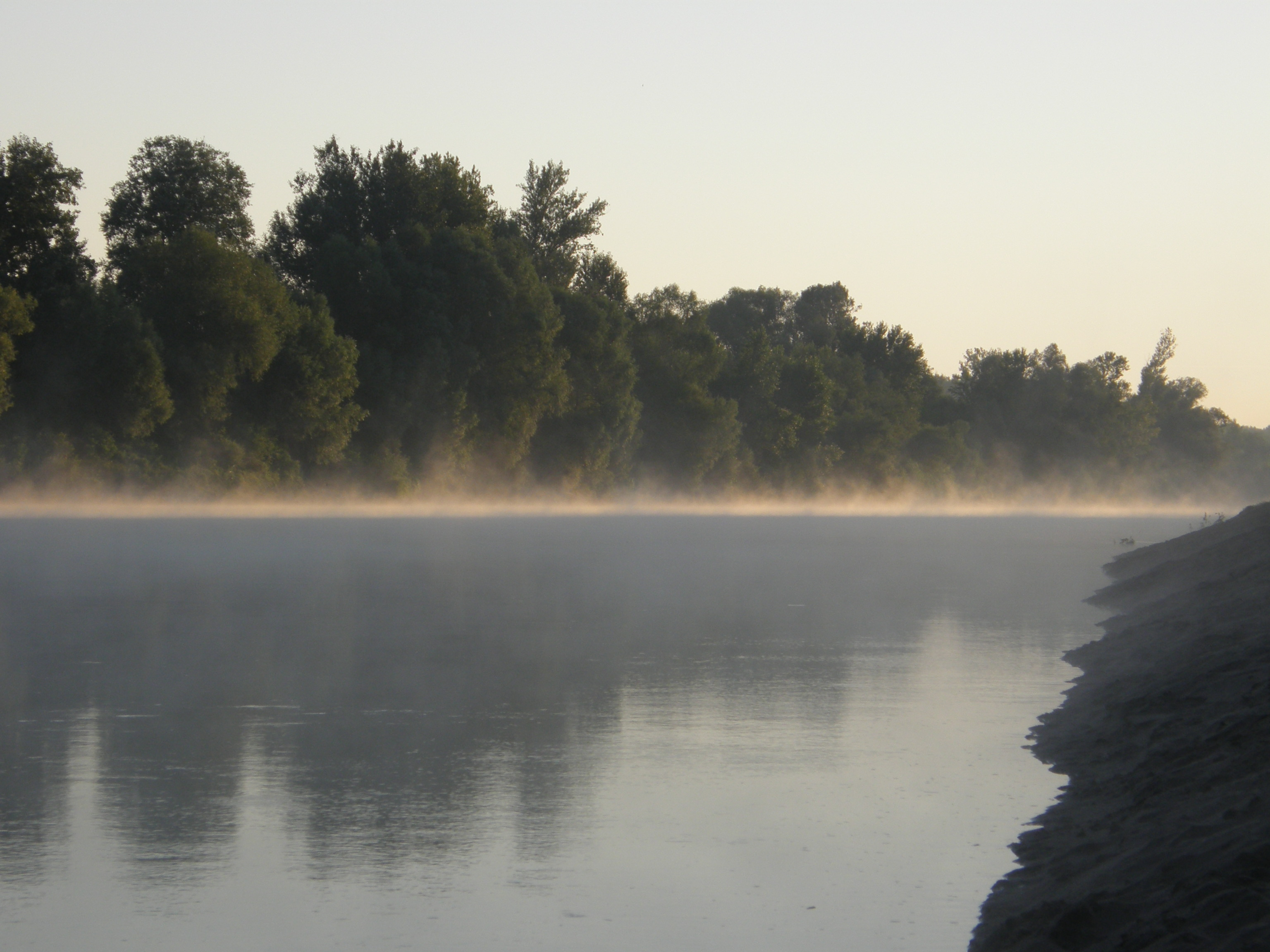
Tisza river near Tiszaadonynál, Hungary

Adony was then the property of Fügedi (de Fygud) Farkas, together with the land of Galgó, on which two villages could settle.

It was bought from Fuk Fügedi by the son of Apoy of the genus Gutkeled, Apopian Apoy, and his son Ekch, who pledged it in 1287 to Péter Szalóki of the genus Szalók for 120 M. However, due to their poverty, they could no longer trigger it, so in 1290 it was finally sold to the Salókians.

It was owned by the Szalók family in the 1300s.

In 1404, King Sigismund confiscated it from the Salokians for infidelity and donated it to the Guti family.

In the 15th century, it was shared by the people of Kerecsényi and the Guti family.

In the 16th century it was owned by the Batthyány family and the Paulines for a while, then it became the property of Mihály Büdi, the chief bishop of Bereg.

In 1600, with the extinction of the Büdi family, Péter Melith acquired their share, and the other part of the estate was acquired by Farkas Lónyai.

It was shared by several landowners before the liberation of Jobbágy, so Count Dégenfeld, Ilosvay, and the Gyulay family also owned it.

Galgó, which has fallen on the outskirts of the settlement and is now extinct:

=== Galgo ===
Galgó was a settlement of the Árpádian era, next to today's Tiszaadony.

Its name was first mentioned in the deeds in 1290 as Golgoua.

Fügedy (de Fyged) was owned by Wolf together with Adon, but around 1260 he sold it to Apoy of Gutkeled, his son Eck, who sold it with Adon in 1290 to Peter, the son of Michael Szalóki of the Szalók family.

In 1298 it was the property of Péter Szalóki, but the sons of Tamás Eszenyi and their serfs destroyed the villa
