= Nagycserkesz =

Coordinates: 47°58′N 21°32′E

- Interactive map of Nagycserkesz
- Country: Hungary
- County: Szabolcs-Szatmár-Bereg

Area
  - Total: 41.5 km^{2} (16.0 sq mi)

Population (2015)
  - Total: 1,778
  - Density: 42.8/km^{2} (111/sq mi)
- Time zone: UTC+1 (CET)
  - Summer (DST): UTC+2 (CEST)
- Postal code: 4445
- Area code: 42

Location of Szabolcs-Szatmar-Bereg county in Hungary

Nagycserkesz (Veľký Čerkes, in Slovak) is a village in Szabolcs-Szatmár-Bereg county, in the Northern Great Plain region of eastern Hungary.

== Geography ==
It covers an area of 41.5 km^{2} (16 sq mi) and has a population of 1778 people (2015).
