= Tiszavid =

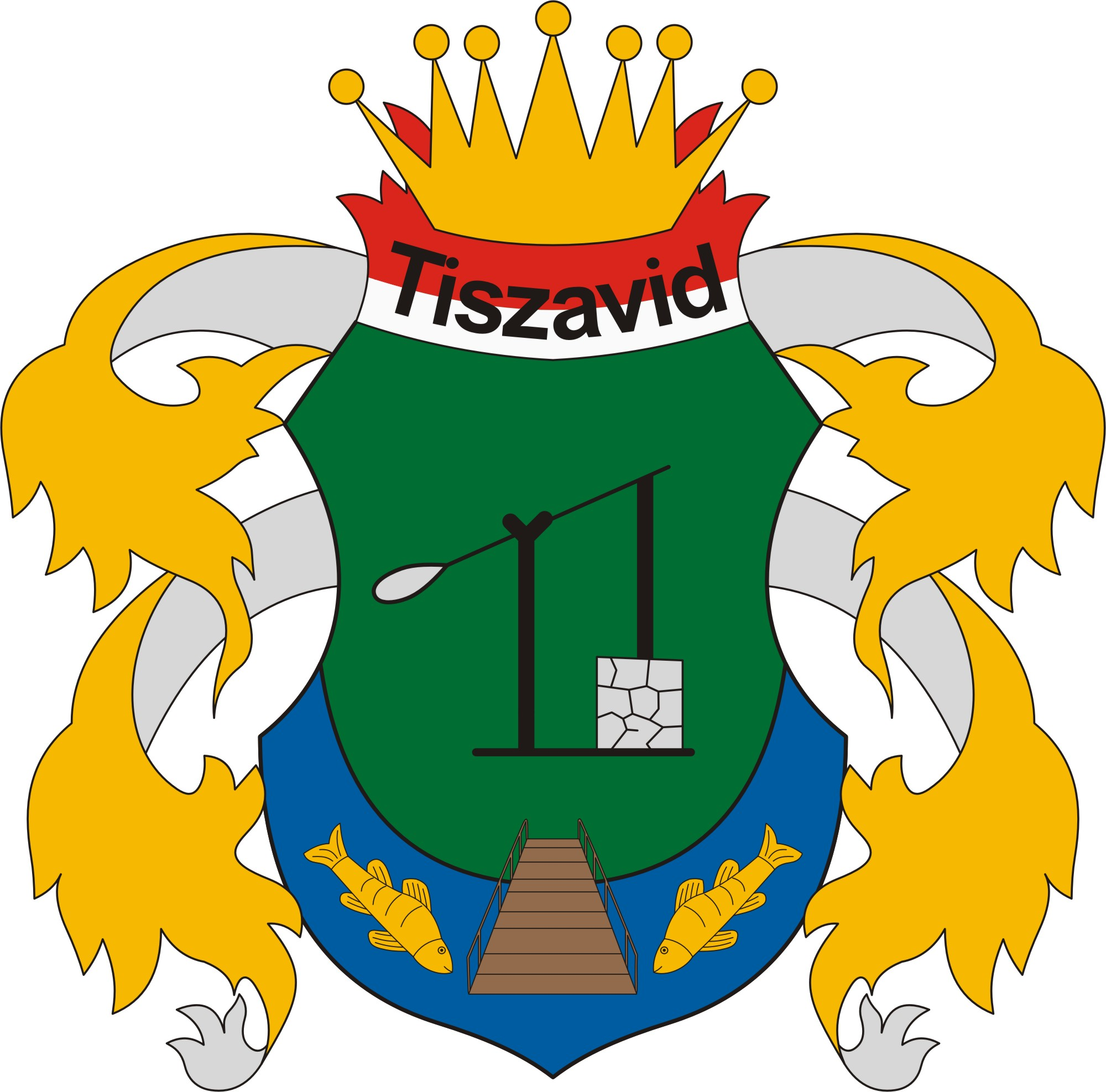
- Coat of arms

- Location of Tiszavid in Hungary
- Coordinates: 48.2°N 22.3°E
- Country: Hungary
- Region: Northern Great Plain
- County: Szabolcs-Szatmár-Bereg

Area
  - Total: 10.75 km^{2} (4.15 sq mi)

Population (2012)
  - Total: 478
  - Density: 44.5/km^{2} (115/sq mi)
- Time zone: UTC+1 (CET)
  - Summer (DST): UTC+2 (CEST)
- Postal code: 4832
- Area code: +36 45
- Website: https://tiszavid.hu/

Tiszavid is a village in Szabolcs-Szatmár-Bereg county, in the Northern Great Plain region of eastern Hungary.

== Geography ==
It covers an area of 10.50 km^{2} (4 sq mi) and has a population of 509 people (2001).

== History ==
Vid's name first appears in the diplomas in 1298, when the sons of Aladár Várdai of the Gutkeled family and the sons of Gabrianus of the Kata family of Mária (Márokpapi) were reconciled here.

In 1312, King Robert gave the estates of Peter Ranold, son of Peter, who had died without an heir, which were occupied by Amadeus and his sons of the tribe of Aba to Peter Apagyi.

Before 1397, István Wassa was also a landowner here, living under the adjective de Wid, otherwise known as de Wassili. Both adjectives were taken from his estate, as the said Yid (Vid) was located in Szabolcs County and was owned by Wassa. István Wassa was also the owner of Szörénybalázsd in Szörény County at that time.

Between 1978 and 1990, Tiszavid was part of the neighboring Tiszaszalka.
