= Szamosszeg =

- Location of Szamosszeg in Hungary
- Coordinates: 48.05°N 22.37°E
- Country: Hungary
- Region: Northern Great Plain
- County: Szabolcs-Szatmár-Bereg

Area
  - Total: 35.30 km^{2} (13.63 sq mi)

Population (2015)
  - Total: 1,946
  - Density: 55.13/km^{2} (142.8/sq mi)
- Time zone: UTC+1 (CET)
  - Summer (DST): UTC+2 (CEST)
- Postal code: 4824
- Area code: +36 44
- Website: http://szamosszeg.hu/

Szamosszeg is a village in Szabolcs-Szatmár-Bereg county, in the Northern Great Plain region of eastern Hungary.

== Geography ==
It covers an area of 35.30 km^{2} (14 sq mi) and has a population of 1946 people (2015).
