= Kántorjánosi =

Coordinates: 47°56′N 22°09′E

- Interactive map of Kántorjánosi
- Country: Hungary
- County: Szabolcs-Szatmár-Bereg

Area
  - Total: 41.62 km^{2} (16.07 sq mi)

Population (2015)
  - Total: 2,173
  - Density: 54.04/km^{2} (140.0/sq mi)
- Time zone: UTC+1 (CET)
  - Summer (DST): UTC+2 (CEST)
- Postal code: 4335
- Area code: 44

Location of Szabolcs-Szatmar-Bereg county in Hungary

Kántorjánosi is a village in Szabolcs-Szatmár-Bereg county, in the Northern Great Plain region of eastern Hungary.

Before World War II, there was a Jewish community. Most of the Jews were murdered by the Nazis in the Holocaust.

== Geography ==
It covers an area of 41.62 km^{2} (16 sq mi) and has a population of 2173 people (2015).
