= Vámosatya =

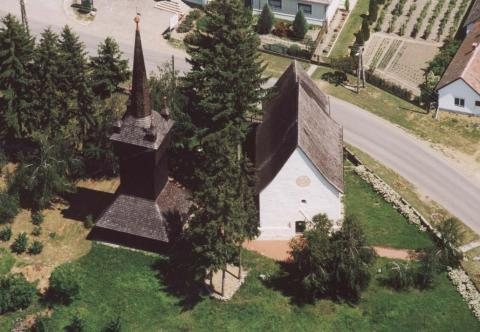
- Vámosatya - wooden belfry, aerial view

- Coat of arms

- Location within Hungary
- Coordinates: 48°12′N 22°25′E
- Country: Hungary
- County: Szabolcs-Szatmár-Bereg

Area
  - Total: 24.29 km^{2} (9.38 sq mi)

Population (2015)
  - Total: 556
  - Density: 23/km^{2} (60/sq mi)
- Time zone: UTC+1 (CET)
  - Summer (DST): UTC+2 (CEST)
- Postal code: 4936
- Area code: 45

Vámosatya is a village in Szabolcs-Szatmár-Bereg county, in the Northern Great Plain region of eastern Hungary.

== Geography ==
It covers an area of 24.29 km^{2} (9 sq mi) and has a population of 556 people (2015).

== History ==
The name of the village Vámosatya first appears in deeds in 1289 as Athya, Athyas.

Later, the area was also owned by the Gutkeled family, the Gacsályi family and the Guthians. The suffix can be derived from the last name.

The prefix "customs" in its name indicates that it was once a customs collection point, a settlement with customs rights. The settlement on the east-west trade route was allowed to charge customs for the passage.

It was mentioned in written sources as early as the 13th century, and in 1333 it was already listed as a populated place in the register of papal tithes. Father's customs was first mentioned in 1399 in the diplomas and literature known so far.

The castle of the Büdy family was mentioned in a charter of 1557, according to which it was abandoned by Mihály Büdy and occupied by Queen Isabért Balassa with Kristóff Hagymási.

The castle was recaptured by the Büdys in 1563, but in 1564, when István Báthory was under siege by the Transylvanian prince, it was handed over to him for free retreat. Báthory demolished the castle.

In 1567 the Tartars ravaged the village and the inhabitants were deported.

However, the village soon became a significant place again, as a county assembly was held here in 1658 and 1710.

On 9 December 1874, Sándor Csanády, the landowner, wrote a 710-acre inner paternal plot and 6 acres of land in Hetény in the name of "Lajos Kossuth, a Turin resident", so that he could be elected. Kossuth resigned from these in 1879, after the consecration of the Naturalization Act.

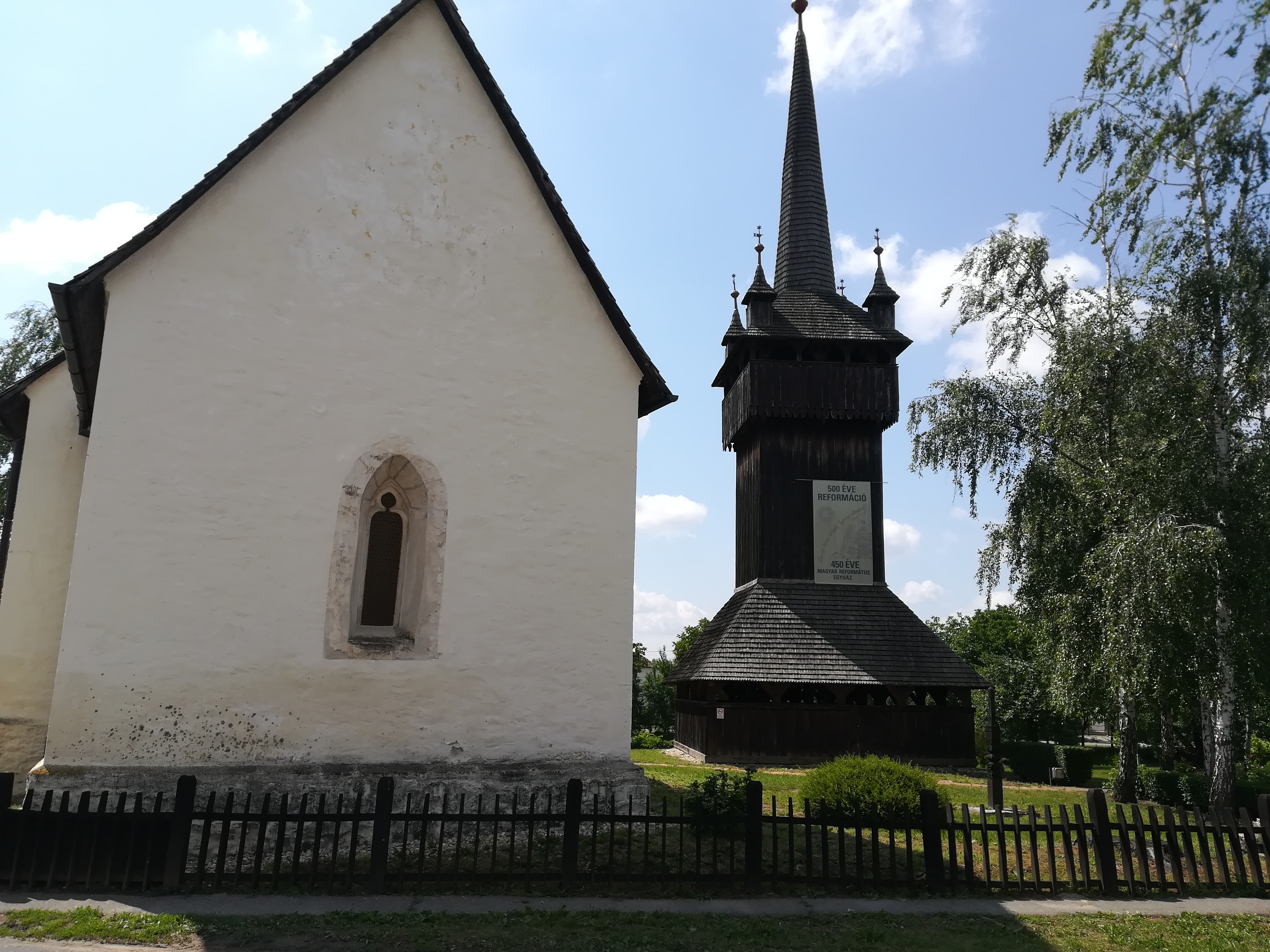
Reformed Church - The charter, built in the beginning of the 14th century and written in 1341, mentions for the first time the existing stone church built in honor of the martyr St. George, on which minor alterations are still being made.

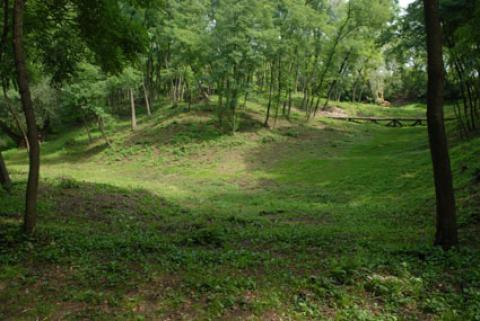
Büdy Castle - Büdy Castle was built by the Büdy family in the 13th century. - Bockerek Forest (Protected area)
