= Tiszakerecseny =

Coordinates: 48°16′N 22°18′E

- Interactive map of Tiszakerecseny
- Country: Hungary
- County: Szabolcs-Szatmár-Bereg

Area
  - Total: 23.87 km^{2} (9.22 sq mi)

Population (2015)
  - Total: 990
  - Density: 41.5/km^{2} (107/sq mi)
- Time zone: UTC+1 (CET)
  - Summer (DST): UTC+2 (CEST)
- Postal code: 4834
- Area code: 45
- Website: http://www.tiszakerecseny.hu

Location of Szabolcs-Szatmar-Bereg county in Hungary

Tiszakerecseny is a village in Szabolcs-Szatmár-Bereg county, in the Northern Great Plain region of eastern Hungary.

== Geography ==
It covers an area of 23.87 km^{2} (9 sq mi) and has a population of 990 people (2015).

== History ==
The name Tiszakerecseny was first mentioned in diplomas in 1324 as Kerechun. The name of the settlement is known from the nobles of Kerecsen belonging to the Szalók family, who were the main owners of the village until the 16th century.

In the 15th century, in addition to the Kerecsenyi family, the Guti and Csapi families also received a share here.

In the first half of the 16th century, János Lónyai also owned it. It was acquired in 1507 by Benedek Batthyány and János Táczay. In 1557 it became the property of the Büdi family, then in 1600 it was given to the Meliths.

After the extinction of the Meliths in 1703, it was owned by the Desssewffy and Lónyay families until 1848, and by the Kerecsényi family until the middle of the 18th century.
