= Kálmánháza =

Coordinates: 47°53′N 21°35′E

- Interactive map of Kálmánháza
- Country: Hungary
- County: Szabolcs-Szatmár-Bereg

Area
  - Total: 37.24 km^{2} (14.38 sq mi)

Population (2015)
  - Total: 1,840
  - Density: 56.63/km^{2} (146.7/sq mi)
- Time zone: UTC+1 (CET)
  - Summer (DST): UTC+2 (CEST)
- Postal code: 4434
- Area code: 42

Location of Szabolcs-Szatmar-Bereg county in Hungary

Kálmánháza is a village in Szabolcs-Szatmár-Bereg county, in the Northern Great Plain region of eastern Hungary.

== Geography ==
It covers an area of 37.24 km^{2} (14 sq mi) and has a population of 1840 people (2015).
