= Benk =

Place in Hungary

Coordinates: 48°18′N 22°14′E

- Interactive map of Benk
- Country: Hungary
- County: Szabolcs-Szatmár-Bereg

Area
  - Total: 8.5 km^{2} (3.3 sq mi)

Population (2025)
  - Total: 401
  - Density: 57.76/km^{2} (149.6/sq mi)
- Time zone: UTC+1 (CET)
  - Summer (DST): UTC+2 (CEST)
- Postal code: 4643
- Area code: 45

Location of Szabolcs-Szatmar-Bereg county in Hungary

Benk is a village in Szabolcs-Szatmár-Bereg county, in the Northern Great Plain region of eastern Hungary.

== Geography ==
It covers an area of 8.5 km^{2} (3 sq mi) and has an estimated population of 401 people (2025).
