= Tiszaszentmárton =

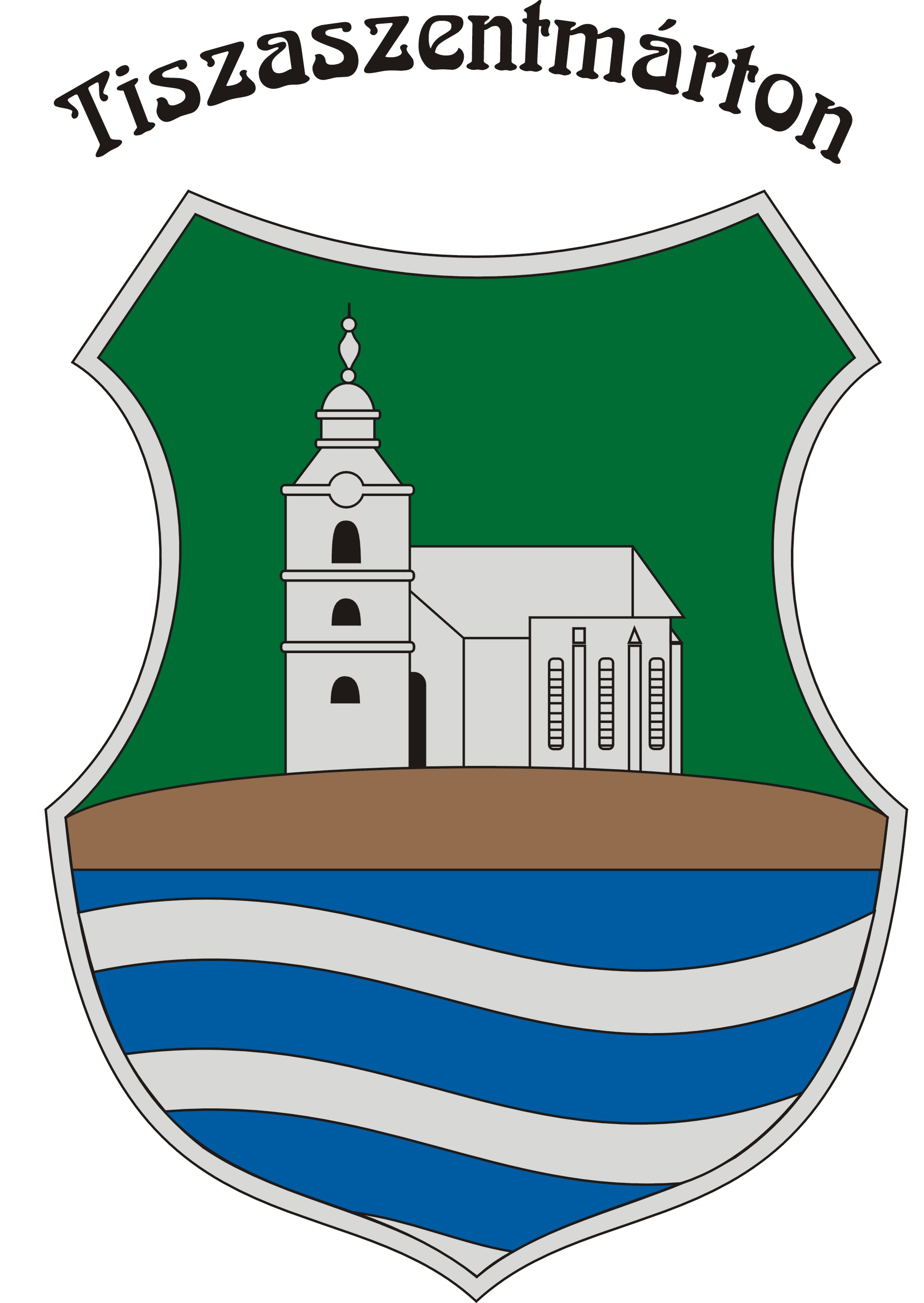
- Coat of arms

- Location of Tiszaszentmárton in Hungary
- Coordinates: 48.38°N 22.23°E
- Country: Hungary
- Region: Northern Great Plain
- County: Szabolcs-Szatmár-Bereg

Area
  - Total: 14.52 km^{2} (5.61 sq mi)

Population (2015)
  - Total: 1,130
  - Density: 77.8/km^{2} (202/sq mi)
- Time zone: UTC+1 (CET)
  - Summer (DST): UTC+2 (CEST)
- Postal code: 4628
- Area code: +36 45
- Website: http://www.tiszaszentmarton.hu/

Tiszaszentmárton is a village in Szabolcs-Szatmár-Bereg county, in the Northern Great Plain region of eastern Hungary. The settlement can be reached by road: on road 4 to Tuzsér, then to the left to Tiszabezdéd, from Záhony.

== Geography ==
It covers an area of 14.55 km^{2} (6 sq mi) and has a population of 1130 people (2015).
