= Jéke =

Coordinates: 48°14′N 22°10′E

- Interactive map of Jéke
- Country: Hungary
- County: Szabolcs-Szatmár-Bereg

Area
  - Total: 6.32 km^{2} (2.44 sq mi)

Population (2013)
  - Total: 729
  - Density: 115.3/km^{2} (299/sq mi)
- Time zone: UTC+1 (CET)
  - Summer (DST): UTC+2 (CEST)
- Postal code: 4611
- Area code: 45

Location of Szabolcs-Szatmar-Bereg county in Hungary

Jéke is a village in Szabolcs-Szatmár-Bereg county, in the Northern Great Plain region of eastern Hungary.

== Geography ==
It covers an area of 6.32 km^{2} (2 sq mi) and has a population of 729 people (2013 estimate).

== Population ==
Year	1980	1990	2001	2010	2011	2013
Population	790 (census)	700 (census)	723 (census)	712 (estimate)	706 (census)	729 (estimate)
