= Rétközberencs =

Coordinates: 48°12′N 22°01′E

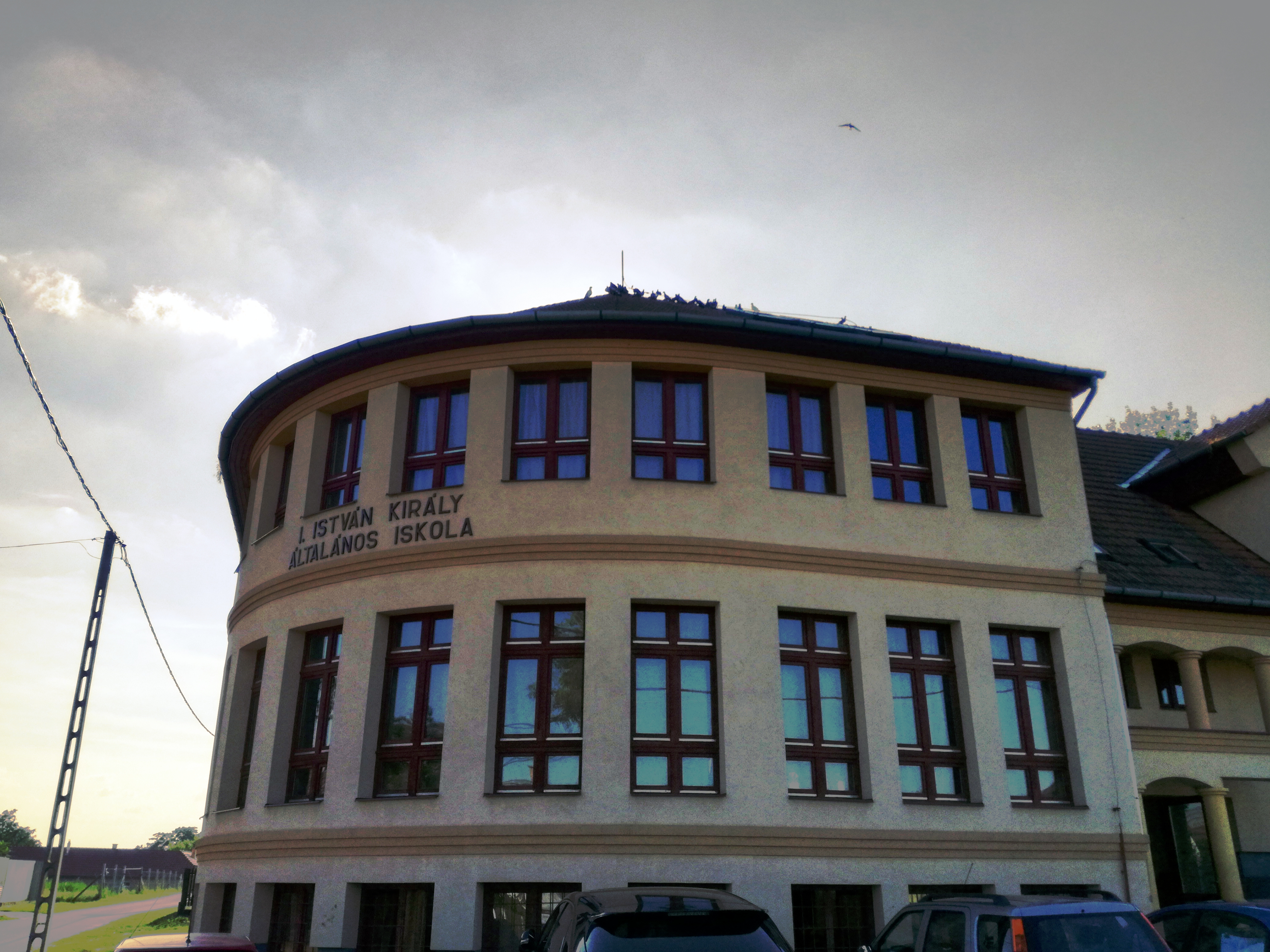

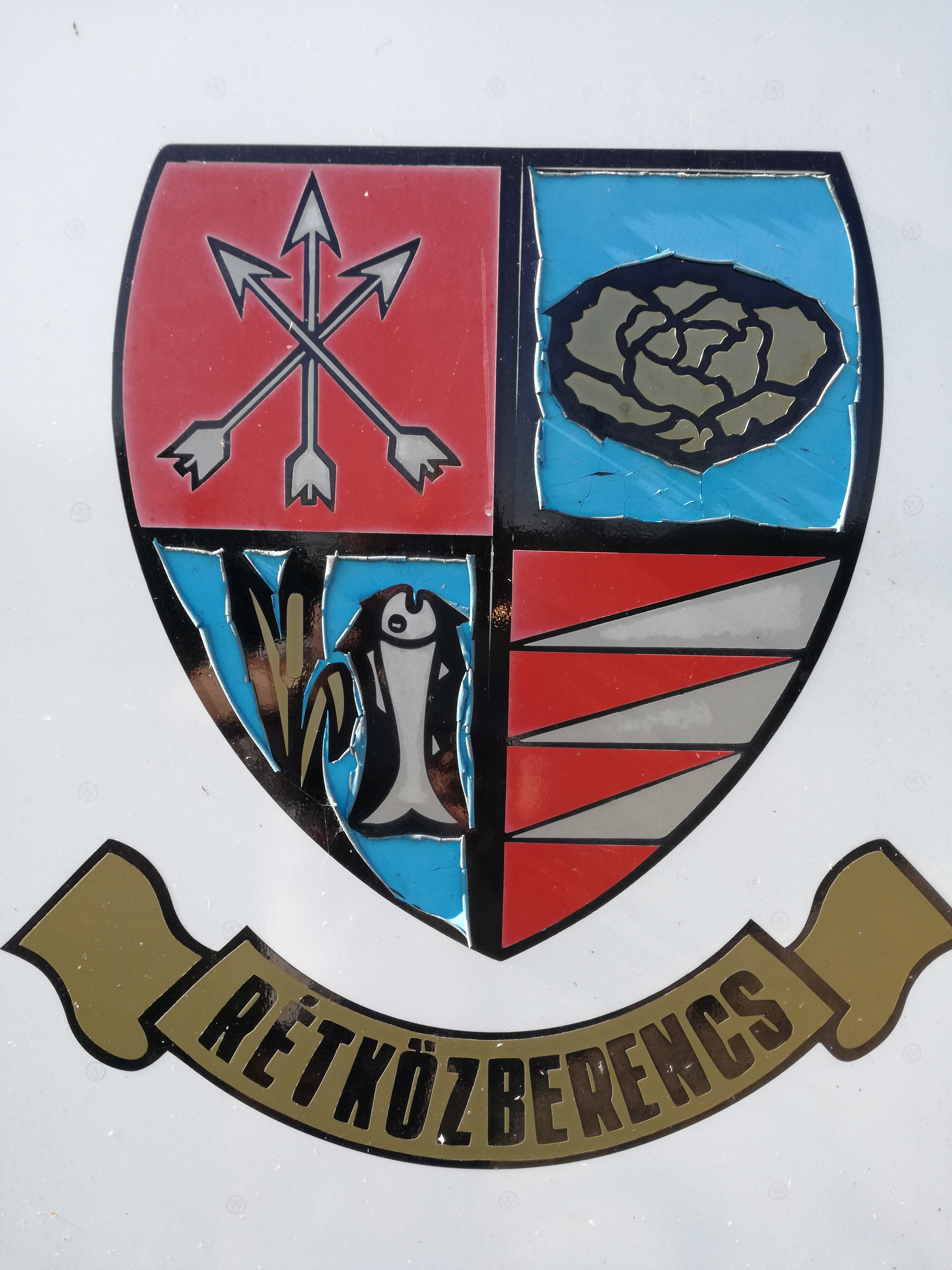
- Coat of arms
- Interactive map of Rétközberencs
- Country: Hungary
- County: Szabolcs-Szatmár-Bereg

Area
  - Total: 15.80 km^{2} (6.10 sq mi)

Population (2015)
  - Total: 1,057
  - Density: 66.9/km^{2} (173/sq mi)
- Time zone: UTC+1 (CET)
  - Summer (DST): UTC+2 (CEST)
- Postal code: 4525
- Area code: 45

Location of Szabolcs-Szatmar-Bereg county in Hungary

Rétözberencs is a village in Szabolcs-Szatmár-Bereg county, in the Northern Great Plain region of eastern Hungary.

== Geography ==
It covers an area of 15.80 km^{2} (6 sq mi) and has a population of 1057 people (2015).
