= Tiszarád =

- Coat of arms

- Location of Tiszarád in Hungary
- Coordinates: 48.12°N 21.8°E
- Country: Hungary
- Region: Northern Great Plain
- County: Szabolcs-Szatmár-Bereg

Area
  - Total: 9.23 km^{2} (3.56 sq mi)

Population (2015)
  - Total: 558
  - Density: 60.5/km^{2} (157/sq mi)
- Time zone: UTC+1 (CET)
  - Summer (DST): UTC+2 (CEST)
- Postal code: 4503
- Area code: +36 42
- Website: http://tiszarad.hu/

Tiszarád is a village in Szabolcs-Szatmár-Bereg county, in the Northern Great Plain region of eastern Hungary.

== Geography ==
It covers an area of 9.23 km^{2} (4 sq mi) and has a population of 558 people (2015).

== History ==
The name of Tiszarád (Rád) was first mentioned in diplomas in 1445, when it was used today. It was owned by the Kemecsey family at the time.

At the end of the 18th century and the first half of the 19th century, it was owned by several families: the Bakó, Borbély, Fejér, Garay, Harsányi, Laskay, Mikecz, Nemess, Korniss, Patay and Zoltán families.

Among the former place and vineyard names of the settlement, the names Estfalva, Mihóksziget, Szelletó, Porosztó, Orsolyasziget and Szívtó were still known here at the beginning of the 20th century.

Samu Borovszky wrote about the village in the early 1900s: "Rád, a small village with 68 houses and 460 inhabitants, mainly of the Reformed religion. His post office, telegraph and railway station are in Kemecse.

The village was famous for its fruit production, even at the beginning of the 20th century most of the orchards of the village were floodplain orchards.
