= Nyírkáta =

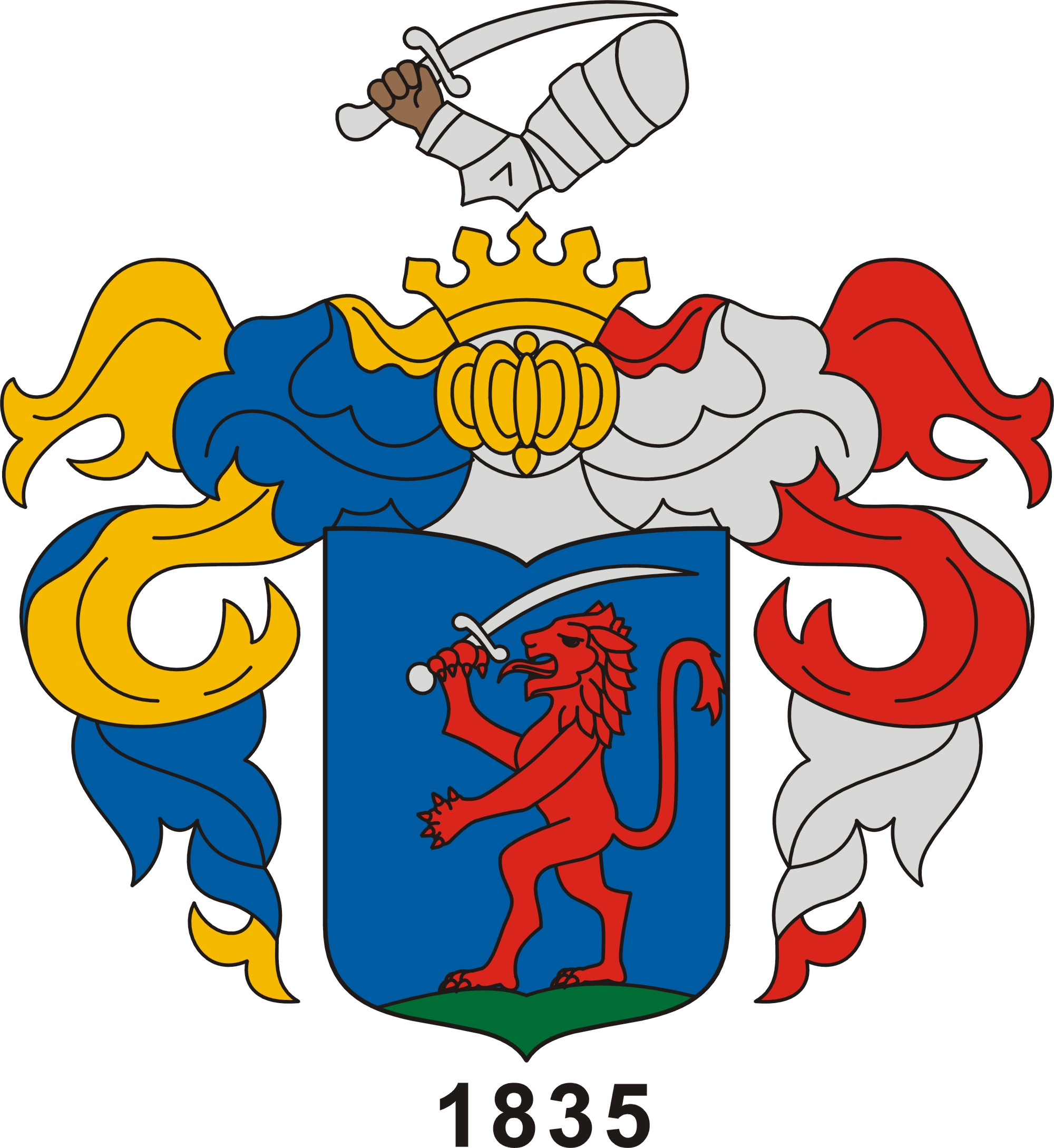
- Coat of arms

- Location of Nyírkáta in Hungary
- Coordinates: 47°51′47″N 22°14′45″E
- Country: Hungary
- Region: Northern Great Plain
- County: Szabolcs-Szatmár-Bereg

Area
  - Total: 38.6 km^{2} (14.9 sq mi)

Population (2011)
  - Total: 1,764
  - Density: 45.7/km^{2} (118/sq mi)
- Time zone: UTC+1 (CET)
  - Summer (DST): UTC+2 (CEST)
- Postal code: 4333
- Area code: +36 74
- Website: www.nyirkata.hu

Nyírkáta is a village in Szabolcs-Szatmár-Bereg County, Hungary.
