= Újkenéz =

Coordinates: 48°15′N 22°14′E

- Coat of arms
- Interactive map of Újkenéz
- Country: Hungary
- County: Szabolcs-Szatmár-Bereg

Area
  - Total: 9.69 km^{2} (3.74 sq mi)

Population (2001)
  - Total: 1,075
  - Density: 110.94/km^{2} (287.3/sq mi)
- Time zone: UTC+1 (CET)
  - Summer (DST): UTC+2 (CEST)
- Postal code: 4635
- Area code: 45

Location of Szabolcs-Szatmar-Bereg county in Hungary

Újkenéz is a village in Szabolcs-Szatmár-Bereg county, in the Northern Great Plain region of eastern Hungary.

== Geography ==
It covers an area of 9.69 km^{2} (4 sq mi) and has a population of 1075 people (2001).

== History ==
The name of the settlement is first mentioned in the charter in 1435 as a settlement between Apáti and Őrmező called Kenes.

In 1419, Cserepes-Kenéz was owned by the Báthor family.

In 1450 the Gyulaházy family owned land here, in 1471 the Kapolcsi family, and in 1480 the Bacskay family.

At the beginning of the 19th century, the family of Bakó Eördögh, Izsák Király and Katona were the owners.

In 1888, the flood of the Tisza ruined most of the village, so the inhabitants of the endangered places had to be relocated to a higher location.
