= Nyírgelse =

Coordinates: 47°45′N 21°59′E

- Village
- Coat of arms
- Interactive map of Nyírgelse
- Country: Hungary
- County: Szabolcs-Szatmár-Bereg

Area
  - Total: 27.61 km^{2} (10.66 sq mi)

Population (2015)
  - Total: 1,112
  - Density: 40.3/km^{2} (104/sq mi)
- Time zone: UTC+1 (CET)
  - Summer (DST): UTC+2 (CEST)
- Postal code: 4362
- Area code: 42

Nyírgelse is a village in Szabolcs-Szatmár-Bereg county, in the Northern Great Plain region of eastern Hungary.

== Geography ==
It covers an area of 27.61 km^{2} (11 sq mi) and has a population of 1112 people (2015).

== History ==
The village was first mentioned in 1310, when it was being divided among members of the Gutkeled clan. The village's name appears to reflect a personal name origin, suggesting it had been settled long before 1310. By 1387, the village belonged to a member of the Kállay family named László.

== Demographics ==
As of 2023, the village had a total population of 1018. As of 2022, the town was 92.2% Hungarian, 0.5% Gypsy, 0.5% Ukrainian, and 1% of non-European origin. The remainder chose not to respond. The population was 41.8% Greek Catholic, 17.3% Reformed, and 8.8% Roman Catholic.
