= Nyírbéltek =

Coordinates: 47°42′N 22°08′E

- Flag Coat of arms
- Interactive map of Nyírbéltek
- Country: Hungary
- County: Szabolcs-Szatmár-Bereg

Area
  - Total: 62.17 km^{2} (24.00 sq mi)

Population (2015)
  - Total: 2,949
  - Density: 47.5/km^{2} (123/sq mi)
- Time zone: UTC+1 (CET)
  - Summer (DST): UTC+2 (CEST)
- Postal code: 4372
- Area code: 42

Location of Szabolcs-Szatmar-Bereg county in Hungary

Nyírbéltek is a village in Szabolcs-Szatmár-Bereg county, in the Northern Great Plain region of eastern Hungary.

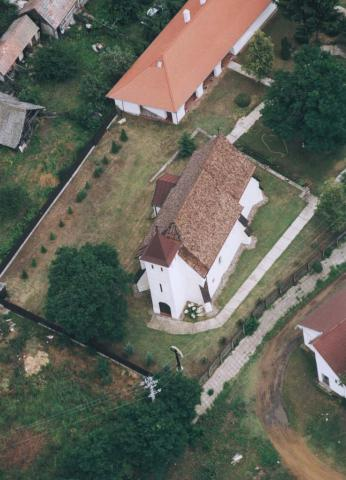
Aerial photography of a church in Nyírbéltek

== Geography ==
It covers an area of 62.17 km^{2} (24 sq mi) and has a population of 2949 people (2015).
