= Nyírgyulaj =

Coordinates: 47°53′N 22°06′E

- Interactive map of Nyírgyulaj
- Country: Hungary
- County: Szabolcs-Szatmár-Bereg

Area
  - Total: 35.76 km^{2} (13.81 sq mi)

Population (2015)
  - Total: 2,047
  - Density: 57.2/km^{2} (148/sq mi)
- Time zone: UTC+1 (CET)
  - Summer (DST): UTC+2 (CEST)
- Postal code: 4311
- Area code: 42

Location of Szabolcs-Szatmar-Bereg county in Hungary

Nyírgyulaj is a village in Szabolcs-Szatmár-Bereg county, in the Northern Great Plain region of eastern Hungary.

== Geography ==
It covers an area of 35.76 km^{2} (14 sq mi) and has a population of 2047 people (2015).
