= Nyírcsászári =

- Location of Nyírcsászári in Hungary
- Coordinates: 47°51′52″N 22°10′29″E
- Country: Hungary
- Region: Northern Great Plain
- County: Szabolcs-Szatmár-Bereg

Area
  - Total: 13.2 km^{2} (5.1 sq mi)

Population (2011)
  - Total: 1,180
  - Density: 89.4/km^{2} (232/sq mi)
- Time zone: UTC+1 (CET)
  - Summer (DST): UTC+2 (CEST)
- Postal code: 4331
- Area code: +36 74
- Website: http://nyircsaszari.hu

Nyírcsászári is a village in Szabolcs-Szatmár-Bereg County, Hungary.
