= Mezőladány =

Coordinates: 48°17′N 22°13′E

- Interactive map of Mezőladány
- Country: Hungary
- County: Szabolcs-Szatmár-Bereg

Area
  - Total: 14.04 km^{2} (5.42 sq mi)

Population (2015)
  - Total: 1,138
  - Density: 81/km^{2} (210/sq mi)
- Time zone: UTC+1 (CET)
  - Summer (DST): UTC+2 (CEST)
- Postal code: 4641
- Area code: 45

Location of Szabolcs-Szatmar-Bereg county in Hungary

Mezőladány is a village in Szabolcs-Szatmár-Bereg county, in the Northern Great Plain region of eastern Hungary.

== Geography ==
It covers an area of 14.04 km^{2} (5 sq mi) and has a population of 1138 people (2015).
