= Kisléta =

Coordinates: 47°50′N 22°01′E

- Coat of arms
- Interactive map of Kisléta
- Country: Hungary
- County: Szabolcs-Szatmár-Bereg

Area
  - Total: 22 km^{2} (8.5 sq mi)

Population (2015)
  - Total: 1,899
- Time zone: UTC+1 (CET)
  - Summer (DST): UTC+2 (CEST)
- Postal code: 4325
- Area code: 42

Location of Szabolcs-Szatmar-Bereg county in Hungary

Kisléta is a village in Szabolcs-Szatmár-Bereg county, in the Northern Great Plain region of eastern Hungary.

== Geography ==
It covers an area of 22 km^{2} (8 sq mi) and has a population of 1950 people (2015).
