= Encsencs =

Coordinates: 47°44′N 22°07′E

- Interactive map of Encsencs
- Country: Hungary
- County: Szabolcs-Szatmár-Bereg

Area
  - Total: 31.91 km^{2} (12.32 sq mi)

Population (2015)
  - Total: 1,958
  - Density: 61.4/km^{2} (159/sq mi)
- Time zone: UTC+1 (CET)
  - Summer (DST): UTC+2 (CEST)
- Postal code: 4374
- Area code: 42

Location of Szabolcs-Szatmar-Bereg county in Hungary

Encsencs is a village in Szabolcs-Szatmár-Bereg county, in the Northern Great Plain region of eastern Hungary.

== Geography ==
It covers an area of 31.91 km^{2} (12 sq mi) and has a population of 1958 people (2015).
