= Lövőpetri =

Coordinates: 48°11′N 22°12′E

- Interactive map of Lövőpetri
- Country: Hungary
- County: Szabolcs-Szatmár-Bereg

Area
  - Total: 9.26 km^{2} (3.58 sq mi)

Population (2015)
  - Total: 477
  - Density: 55.62/km^{2} (144.1/sq mi)
- Time zone: UTC+1 (CET)
  - Summer (DST): UTC+2 (CEST)
- Postal code: 4633
- Area code: 45

Location of Szabolcs-Szatmar-Bereg county in Hungary

Lövőpetri is a village in Szabolcs-Szatmár-Bereg county, in the Northern Great Plain region of eastern Hungary.

== Geography ==
It covers an area of 9.26 km^{2} (4 sq mi) and has a population of 477 people (2015).
