= Tiszatelek =

Coordinates: 48°12′N 21°48′E

- Interactive map of Tiszatelek
- Country: Hungary
- County: Szabolcs-Szatmár-Bereg

Area
  - Total: 33.78 km^{2} (13.04 sq mi)

Population (2015)
  - Total: 1,400
  - Density: 41.5/km^{2} (107/sq mi)
- Time zone: UTC+1 (CET)
  - Summer (DST): UTC+2 (CEST)
- Postal code: 4487
- Area code: 42
- Website: https://tiszatelek.hu

Location of Szabolcs-Szatmar-Bereg county in Hungary

Tiszatelek is a village in Szabolcs-Szatmár-Bereg county, in the Northern Great Plain region of eastern Hungary. In the name of the settlement, the word "telek" is a historical name, while the word "Tisza" refers to the geographical location.

== Geography ==
It covers an area of 33.78 km^{2} (13 sq mi) and has a population of 1400 people (2015).

== History ==
The area around Tiszatelek was already inhabited in the Bronze Age, according to archaeological finds excavated in its boundaries. The former inhabitants of the late Bronze Age Gáva culture populated the whole area. They built their dwellings here on a ridge rising from a marsh in the Rétköz, which not only protected them from external enemies but also kept their livestock from straggling.

The present village of Tiszatelek was founded in 1954 as a one-road settlement on a sandbank of the Rétköz, free from flooding.
