= Anarcs =

Place in Hungary

Coordinates: 48°11′N 22°07′E

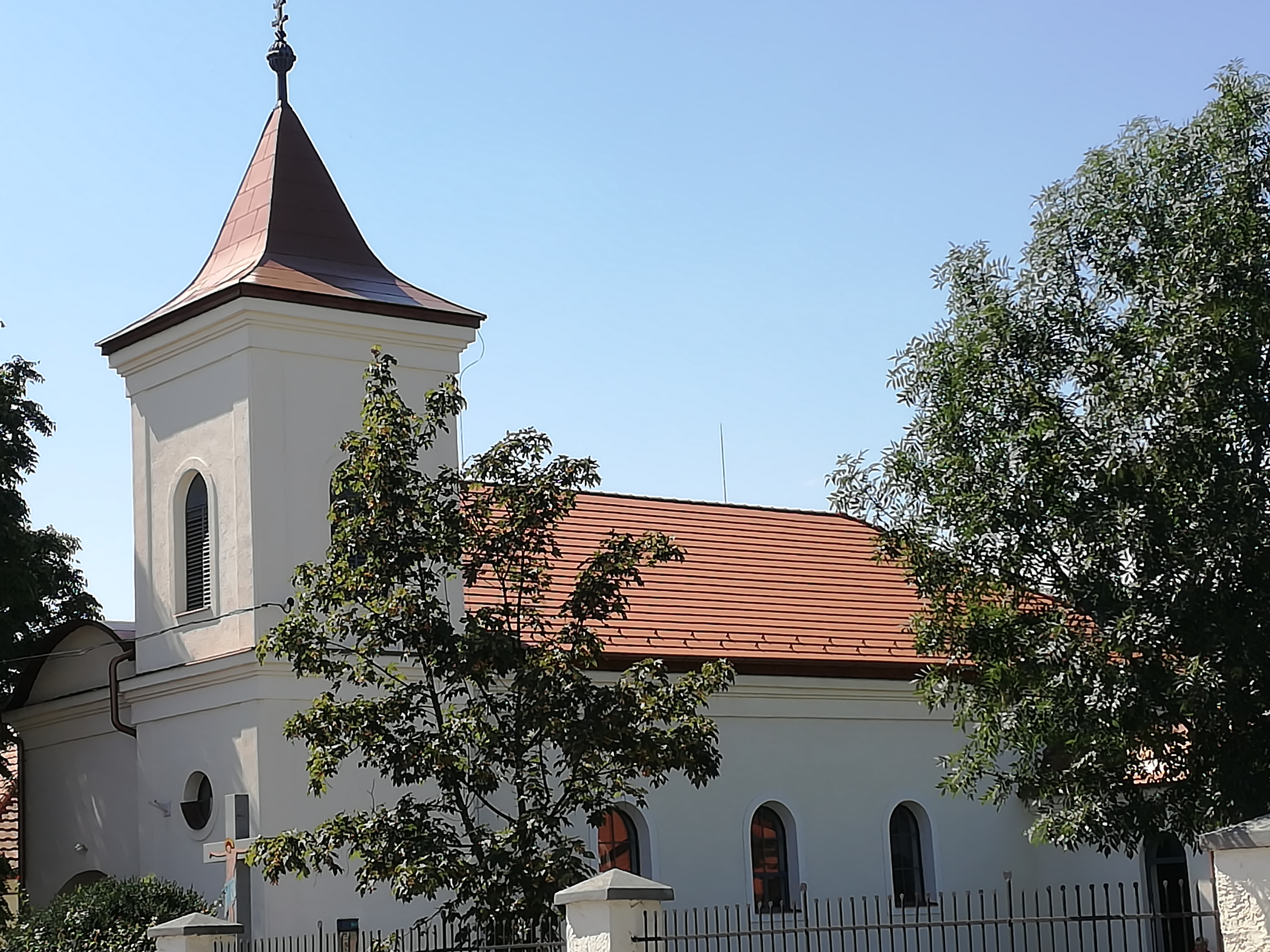

- Coat of arms
- Interactive map of Anarcs
- Country: Hungary
- County: Szabolcs-Szatmár-Bereg

Area
  - Total: 17.06 km^{2} (6.59 sq mi)

Population (2025)
  - Total: 1,841
  - Density: 107.91/km^{2} (279.5/sq mi)
- Time zone: UTC+1 (CET)
  - Summer (DST): UTC+2 (CEST)
- Postal code: 4546
- Area code: 45

Location of Szabolcs-Szatmar-Bereg county in Hungary

Anarcs is a village in Szabolcs-Szatmár-Bereg county, in the Northern Great Plain region of eastern Hungary.

== Geography ==
It covers an area of 17.06 km^{2} (7 sq mi) and has a population of 1,841 people (2025).
