= Szabolcsbáka =

Coordinates: 48°09′N 22°09′E

- Interactive map of Szabolcsbáka
- Country: Hungary
- County: Szabolcs-Szatmár-Bereg

Area
  - Total: 19.84 km^{2} (7.66 sq mi)

Population (2015)
  - Total: 1,162
  - Density: 58.6/km^{2} (152/sq mi)
- Time zone: UTC+1 (CET)
  - Summer (DST): UTC+2 (CEST)
- Postal code: 4547
- Area code: 45

Location of Szabolcs-Szatmar-Bereg county in Hungary

Szabolcsbáka is a village in Szabolcs-Szatmár-Bereg county, in the Northern Great Plain region of eastern Hungary.

== Geography ==
It covers an area of 19.84 km^{2} (8 sq mi) and has a population of 1162 people (2015).
