= Pócspetri =

Coordinates: 47°53′N 22°00′E

- Interactive map of Pócspetri
- Country: Hungary
- County: Szabolcs-Szatmár-Bereg

Area
  - Total: 26.37 km^{2} (10.18 sq mi)

Population (2015)
  - Total: 1,674
  - Density: 63.5/km^{2} (164/sq mi)
- Time zone: UTC+1 (CET)
  - Summer (DST): UTC+2 (CEST)
- Postal code: 4327
- Area code: 42

Location of Szabolcs-Szatmar-Bereg county in Hungary

Pócspetri is a village in Szabolcs-Szatmár-Bereg county, in the Northern Great Plain region of eastern Hungary.

== Geography ==
It covers an area of 26.37 km^{2} (10 sq mi) and has a population of 1869 people (2015).
