= Napkor =

Coordinates: 47°56′N 21°53′E

- Interactive map of Napkor
- Country: Hungary
- County: Szabolcs-Szatmár-Bereg

Area
  - Total: 37.35 km^{2} (14.42 sq mi)

Population (2015)
  - Total: 3,664
  - Density: 98.1/km^{2} (254/sq mi)
- Time zone: UTC+1 (CET)
  - Summer (DST): UTC+2 (CEST)
- Postal code: 4552
- Area code: 42

Location of Szabolcs-Szatmar-Bereg county in Hungary

Napkor is a village in Szabolcs-Szatmár-Bereg county, in the Northern Great Plain region of eastern Hungary.

== Geography ==
It covers an area of 37.35 km^{2} (14 sq mi) and has a population of 3664 people (2015).
