= Fábiánháza =

Coordinates: 47°50′N 22°22′E

- Interactive map of Fábiánháza
- Country: Hungary
- County: Szabolcs-Szatmár-Bereg

Area
  - Total: 27.35 km^{2} (10.56 sq mi)

Population (2015)
  - Total: 1,747
  - Density: 63.9/km^{2} (166/sq mi)
- Time zone: UTC+1 (CET)
  - Summer (DST): UTC+2 (CEST)
- Postal code: 4354
- Area code: 44

Location of Szabolcs-Szatmar-Bereg county in Hungary

Fábiánháza is a village in Szabolcs-Szatmár-Bereg county, in the Northern Great Plain region of eastern Hungary.

== Geography ==
It covers an area of 31.33 km^{2} (12 sq mi) and has a population of 1747 people (2015).
