= Pátroha =

Coordinates: 48°10′N 22°00′E

- Interactive map of Pátroha
- Country: Hungary
- County: Szabolcs-Szatmár-Bereg

Area
  - Total: 39.22 km^{2} (15.14 sq mi)

Population (2015)
  - Total: 2,927
  - Density: 74.6/km^{2} (193/sq mi)
- Time zone: UTC+1 (CET)
  - Summer (DST): UTC+2 (CEST)
- Postal code: 4523
- Area code: 45

Location of Szabolcs-Szatmar-Bereg county in Hungary

Pátroha is a village in Szabolcs-Szatmár-Bereg county, in the Northern Great Plain region of eastern Hungary.

== Geography ==
It covers an area of 39.22 km^{2} (15 sq mi) and has a population of 2927 people (2015).
