= Vasmegyer =

Coordinates: 48°07′N 21°49′E

- Coat of arms
- Interactive map of Vasmegyer
- Country: Hungary
- County: Szabolcs-Szatmár-Bereg

Area
  - Total: 22.73 km^{2} (8.78 sq mi)

Population (2006)
  - Total: 1,621
  - Density: 72.59/km^{2} (188.0/sq mi)
- Time zone: UTC+1 (CET)
  - Summer (DST): UTC+2 (CEST)
- Postal code: 4502
- Area code: 42

Location of Szabolcs-Szatmar-Bereg county in Hungary

Vasmegyer is a village in Szabolcs-Szatmár-Bereg county, in the Northern Great Plain region of eastern Hungary.

== Geography ==
It covers an area of 22.73 km^{2} (9 sq mi) and has a population of 1621 people (2006).

== History ==
The settlement and its surroundings have been inhabited since ancient times, and people have lived in the area since the Stone Age, as evidenced by the finds found here.

According to tradition, the ancient settlement was named after the leader of Megyer.

The name of the settlement was first mentioned by the diplomatic archives in 1452 as Meger, and then in the data of the national archives of the foundry it appears in 1462 in the form of Felmegyer. The charter of the archives of the Kállay family, dated 1466, already mentioned it as Vas-Megyer.

The owners of the settlement were members of the Vas family in the mid-1300s.

In 1385, Queen Mary donated the estate of Miklós Vas, who died without a successor, to Sebestén Csaholyi from the Csaholyi family.

In 1446 the Stritey family was the landlord of the settlement, and in the 18th century the Megyeri, Oláhok and Vécseyek.

At the beginning of the 20th century, it was owned by Géza Megyery, György Bónis and Antal Deutsch.

According to tradition, there was once a cluster on the border of Vasmegyer, in the part called Apáti dűlő, the ruins of which date back to the 20th century. They were also visible at the beginning of the 19th century, and old money was found among these ruins several times.
