= Nyírderzs =

Coordinates: 47°54′N 22°10′E

- Interactive map of Nyírderzs
- Country: Hungary
- County: Szabolcs-Szatmár-Bereg

Area
  - Total: 17.01 km^{2} (6.57 sq mi)

Population (2015)
  - Total: 655
  - Density: 38.5/km^{2} (100/sq mi)
- Time zone: UTC+1 (CET)
  - Summer (DST): UTC+2 (CEST)
- Postal code: 4332
- Area code: 42

Location of Szabolcs-Szatmar-Bereg county in Hungary

Nyírderzs is a village in Szabolcs-Szatmár-Bereg county, in the Northern Great Plain region of eastern Hungary.

== Geography ==
It covers an area of 17.01 km^{2} (7 sq mi) and has a population of 655 people (2015).
