= Nyírpilis =

Coordinates: 47°47′N 22°11′E

- Interactive map of Nyírpilis
- Country: Hungary
- County: Szabolcs-Szatmár-Bereg

Area
  - Total: 16.34 km^{2} (6.31 sq mi)

Population (2025)
  - Total: 939
  - Density: 42.72/km^{2} (110.6/sq mi)
- Time zone: UTC+1 (CET)
  - Summer (DST): UTC+2 (CEST)
- Postal code: 4376
- Area code: 42

Location of Szabolcs-Szatmar-Bereg county in Hungary

Nyírpilis is a village in Szabolcs-Szatmár-Bereg county, in the Northern Great Plain region of eastern Hungary.

== Geography ==
It covers an area of 16.34 km^{2} (6 sq mi) and has a population of 939 people (2025).
