= Terem, Hungary =

Terem
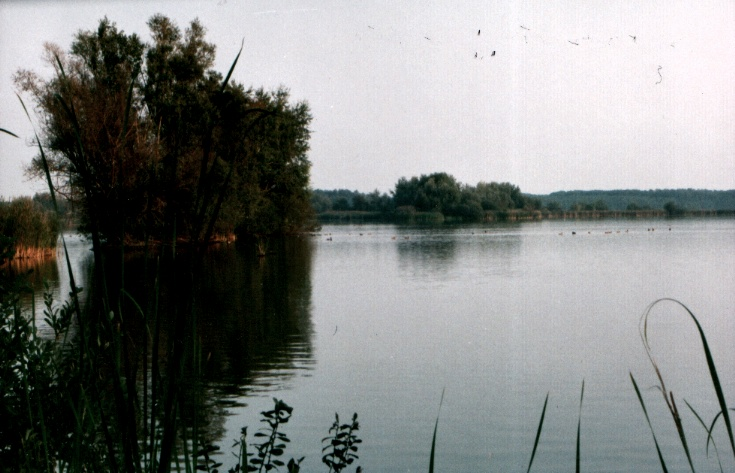
- Image of Terem Lake in Terem, Hungary.

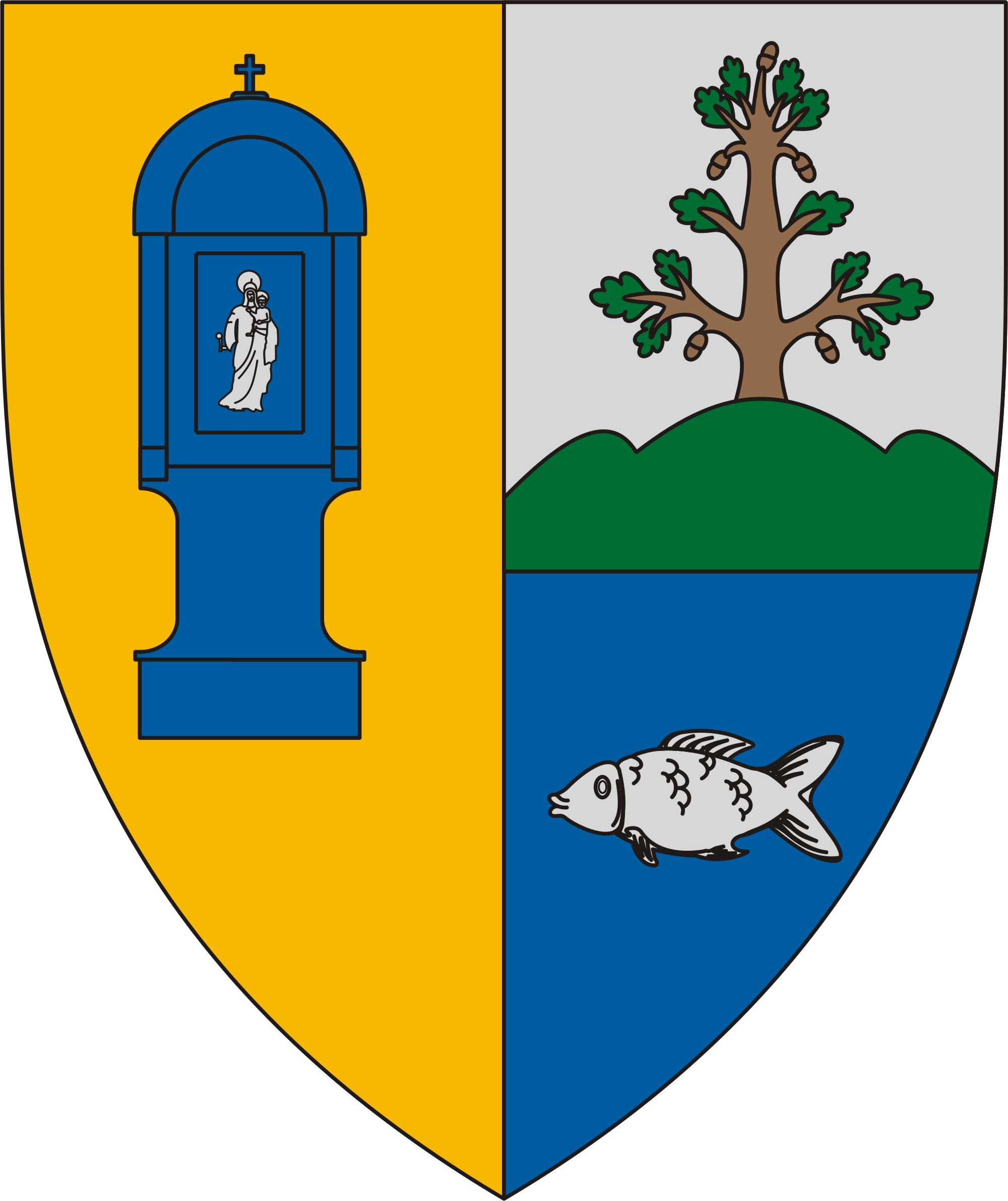
- Flag Coat of arms

- Location of Terem in Hungary. Terem (Szabolcs-Szatmár-Bereg County)
- Coordinates: 47°48′N 22°19′E
- Country: Hungary
- Region: Northern Great Plain
- County: Szabolcs-Szatmár-Bereg
- District: Nyírbátor District

Government
  - Mayor: Csák István (Fidesz–KDNP)

Area
  - Total: 49.50 km^{2} (19.11 sq mi)

Population (2022)
  - Total: 574
  - Density: 11.6/km^{2} (30.0/sq mi)
- Time zone: UTC+1 (CET)
  - Summer (DST): UTC+2 (CEST)
- Postal code: 4342
- Area code: 42
- Website: https://terem.hu

Terem is a village in Szabolcs-Szatmár-Bereg county, in the Northern Great Plain region of eastern Hungary.

== Geography ==
It covers an area of 49.50 km^{2} (19 sq mi) and has a population of 574 people (2022).

== History ==
Terem's name was mentioned in the charters first in 1332 as Banknetereme, then in 1354 as Bankneytereme, in 1413 as Therem. In 1332, the sons of Bereck of Báthor, belonging to the Gutkeled clan, had property bordering Bohol. In 1354, members of the Báthor family: Peter, Master Nicholas, and the sons of John shared it, while the church dedicated to St. Demeter was practiced together.

In the 14th century the owners of the village were members of the Báthory family.

The settlement was destroyed in the Turkish era, and its name is hardly mentioned in the following centuries.

It was registered as part of the border of Mátészalka in 1873 and as part of Vállaj in 1888, and it belonged to Vállaj administratively until 1952.

At the end of the 19th century and the beginning of the 20th century, the Károlyi family had homesteads scattered in the area. Terem is a settlement consisting mainly of scattered homesteads. In 1907, its name was mentioned as the Pusztaterem, at which time it belonged to Dohányos Major, Fűzfáskút Maid, Viktor Plot, Erdészlak and Erdőőrlak.

In 1964, Pusztaterem also had a residential area called Nagytanya, Ürgetanya, Rokatanya and Udvarház.

Terem was established in 1952 as an independent village from the above-mentioned settlements and the Cserepes-tanya farm in Aporliget, as well as the Nagyfenék and Sárgaháza settlements.

It was named in memory of the destroyed village.

From April 15, 1971, it became a joint council with Aporliget (now Bátorliget). It has been a joint council village belonging to the Nyírbátor catchment area since 1989. From 1990 it became an independent municipality.

Most of the village's population still lives on scattered homesteads today. Of the 298 residential houses in the Terem, according to 1980 data, only 157 were built in the interior.

Its most significant homesteads: Nagyfenék, Sárgaháza. There was even a school in Sárgaháza in the 1950s and 1960s, but the development of the inner area has slowed down in recent years, and many have moved from the settlement and homesteads to nearby Nyírbátor or larger towns.

The ruined settlement of Csaba also melted into the border of the Terem.

=== Csaba ===
Csaba was once a village a little north of today's Hall, on the border of Nyírkáta-Fábiánháza, but in 1241 it was destroyed during the Tartar invasion. Today, only the surviving place and vineyard names preserve its memory: Csobaháza, Csobaházi-dűlő, Csobaházi nagy út.
