= Bátorliget =

Place in Hungary

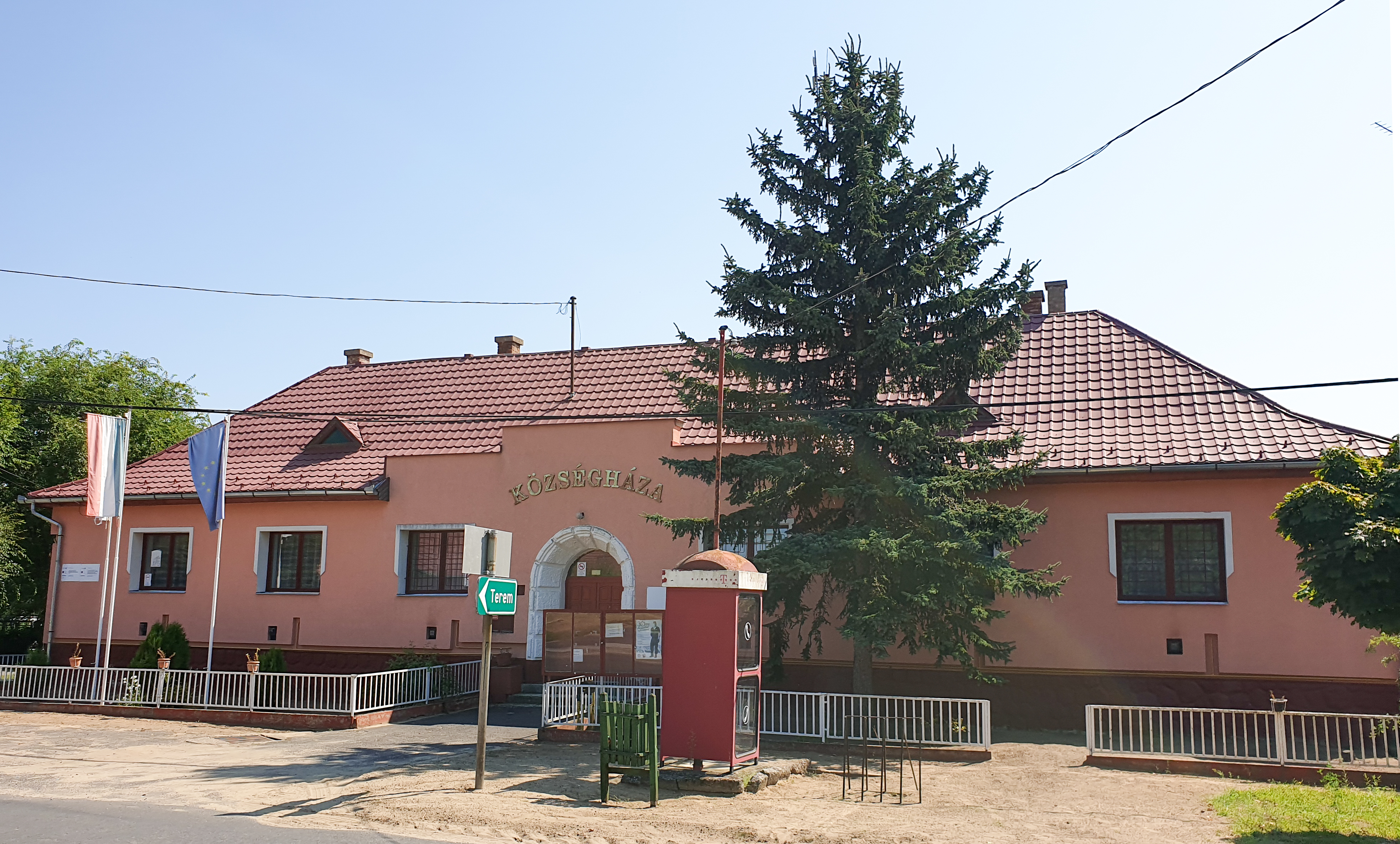
- Village hall

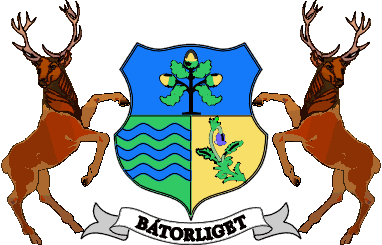
- Coat of arms

- Location within Hungary Location within Europe
- Coordinates: 47°45′45″N 22°16′21″E
- Country: Hungary
- County: Szabolcs-Szatmár-Bereg

Area
  - Total: 33.30 km^{2} (12.86 sq mi)

Population (2015)
  - Total: 669
  - Density: 20.1/km^{2} (52.0/sq mi)
- Time zone: UTC+1 (CET)
  - Summer (DST): UTC+2 (CEST)
- Postal code: 4343
- Area code: 42

Bátorliget (before 1975: Aporliget) is a village in Szabolcs-Szatmár-Bereg county, in the Northern Great Plain region of eastern Hungary.

The village (then named Aporliget) was the last one to be electrified in the country, on August 20, 1963, thus completing the 75-year-long process of electrification (which incidentally started in a nearby town, Mátészalka, in 1888).

== Geography ==
It covers an area of 33.30 km^{2} (13 sq mi) and has a population of 669 people (2015).

Nearby is Bátorliget Pasture NCA (Nature Conservation Area).
