= Dombrád =

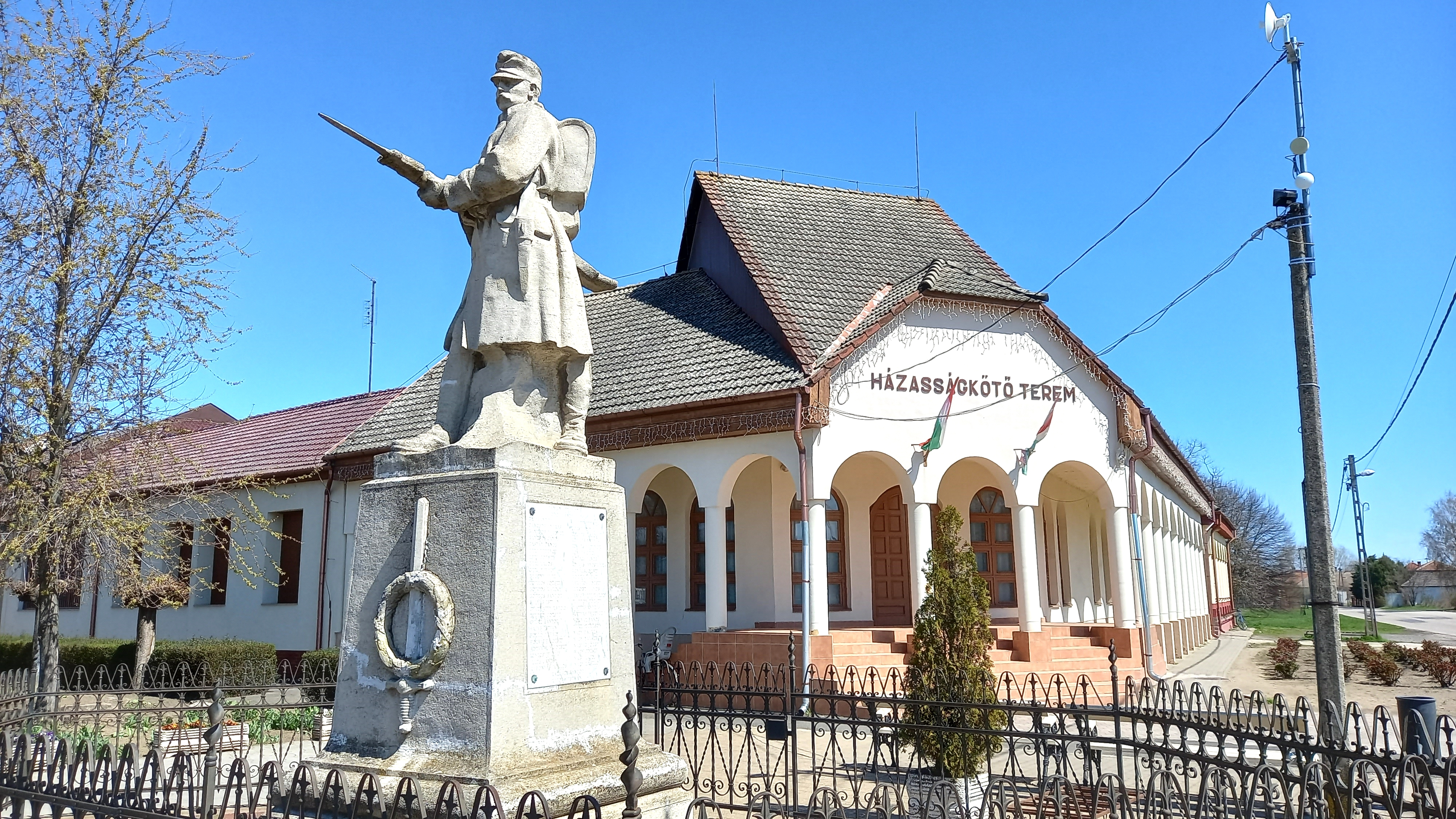

- Flag Coat of arms

- Location within Hungary
- Coordinates: 48°14′N 21°56′E
- Country: Hungary
- County: Szabolcs-Szatmár-Bereg

Area
  - Total: 51.84 km^{2} (20.02 sq mi)

Population (2015)
  - Total: 4,015
  - Density: 77.45/km^{2} (200.6/sq mi)
- Time zone: UTC+1 (CET)
  - Summer (DST): UTC+2 (CEST)
- Postal code: 4492
- Area code: 45

Dombrád is a town in Szabolcs-Szatmár-Bereg county, in the Northern Great Plain region of eastern Hungary.

== Etymology ==
The name comes from a Slavic personal name, compare with Czech Domorád, Domorod or Serbo-Croatian Domorad.

== Geography ==
It covers an area of 51.84 km^{2} (20 sq mi) and has a population of 4015 people (2015). www.dombrad.hu
