= Ömböly =

Coordinates: 47°42′N 22°13′E

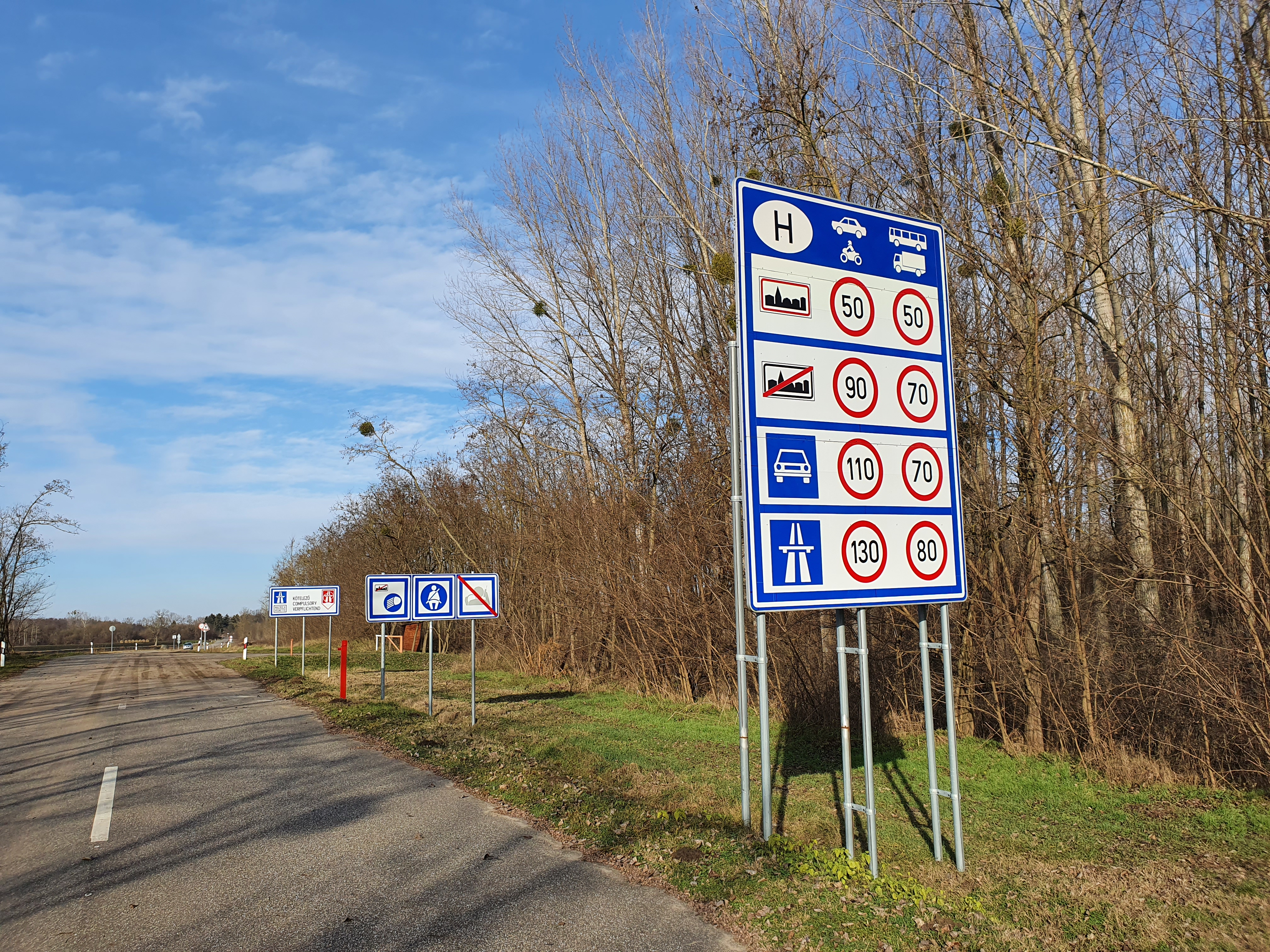
- The border at Ömböly

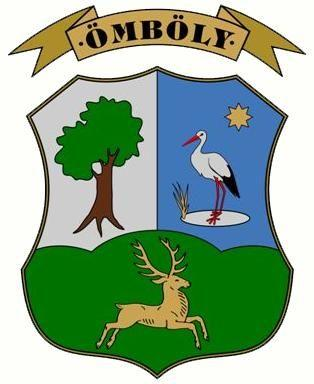
- Coat of arms

- Location within Szabolcs-Szatmár-Bereg County Location within Hungary
- Country: Hungary
- County: Szabolcs-Szatmár-Bereg

Government
  - Mayor: Gábor Trefán (Fidesz)

Area
  - Total: 30.35 km^{2} (11.72 sq mi)

Population (2001)
  - Total: 466
  - Density: 15.35/km^{2} (39.8/sq mi)
- Time zone: UTC+1 (CET)
  - Summer (DST): UTC+2 (CEST)
- Postal code: 4373
- Area code: 42

Location of Szabolcs-Szatmar-Bereg County in Hungary

Ömböly is a village in the Nyírbátor District, in Szabolcs-Szatmár-Bereg County, in the Northern Great Plain region of eastern Hungary.

== Geography ==
It covers an area of 30.35 km^{2} (12 sq mi) and has a population of 466 in 2001.

== History ==
Its name is first mentioned in documents in 1298 as the property of Endes belonging to Kaplony.

In the 14th century, the Vetéssy family and the Bagossy family litigated for its possession.

In 1406, it becomes the property of the Csomaközy family, then the Károlyi family becomes the owner, and it remains theirs in the subsequent centuries.

By 1516, it is already noted only as a wasteland, likely depopulated during the peasant uprising.

Ömböly, the property of the Károlyi family belonging to the Kaplony lineage, used to be part of the Szaniszló settlement (now located in Romania) and consisted of two parts: Ömböly and Zsuzsanna-major. The economic center of the nearby rural settlements, located about three kilometers apart, was Zsuzsanna-major.

In the early 20th century, only a forester's residence stood in the area of Ömböly, later replaced by the so-called Zömbölyi inn. Nearby was also Károly-major, but it too became part of Romanian territory.

In 1947, Ömböly and Zsuzsanna-major were merged into an independent village. The new settlement took the name of the old medieval village, Ömböly. The inhabitants of the village refer to the old Ömböly as Kisömböly and Zsuzsanna-major as Nagyömböly.

From 1950, the settlement belongs to the Piricsei Common Council of Nyírbátor District, and from 1989, it is within the attraction area of Nyírbátor District.

On September 21, 2014, the road leading to Szaniszló was completed.

== Civic life ==
=== Mayors ===
- 1990–1994: Sándor Vékony (independent)
- 1994–1998: Sándor Vékony (independent)
- 1998–2002: Sándor Vékony (independent)
- 2002–2006: Gábor Trefán (független)
- 2006–2010: Gábor Trefán (független)
- 2010–2014: Gábor Trefán (Fidesz-KDNP)
- 2014–2019: Gábor Trefán (Fidesz-KDNP)
- 2019: Trefán Gábor (Fidesz-KDNP)
