= Érpatak =

- Flag Coat of arms

- Location of Szabolcs-Szatmar-Bereg county in Hungary

- Location within Hungary
- Coordinates: 47°48′N 21°46′E
- Country: Hungary
- County: Szabolcs-Szatmár-Bereg

Government
  - Mayor: Nagy Imre Attiláné (Fidesz-KDNP)

Area
  - Total: 31.64 km^{2} (12.22 sq mi)

Population (2022)
  - Total: 1,610
  - Density: 50.9/km^{2} (132/sq mi)
- Time zone: UTC+1 (CET)
  - Summer (DST): UTC+2 (CEST)
- Postal code: 4245
- Area code: 42

Érpatak is a village in Szabolcs-Szatmár-Bereg county, in the Northern Great Plain region of eastern Hungary.

== Geography ==
It covers an area of 31.64 km^{2} (12 sq mi) and has a population of 1,610 people (2022).
