= Őr =

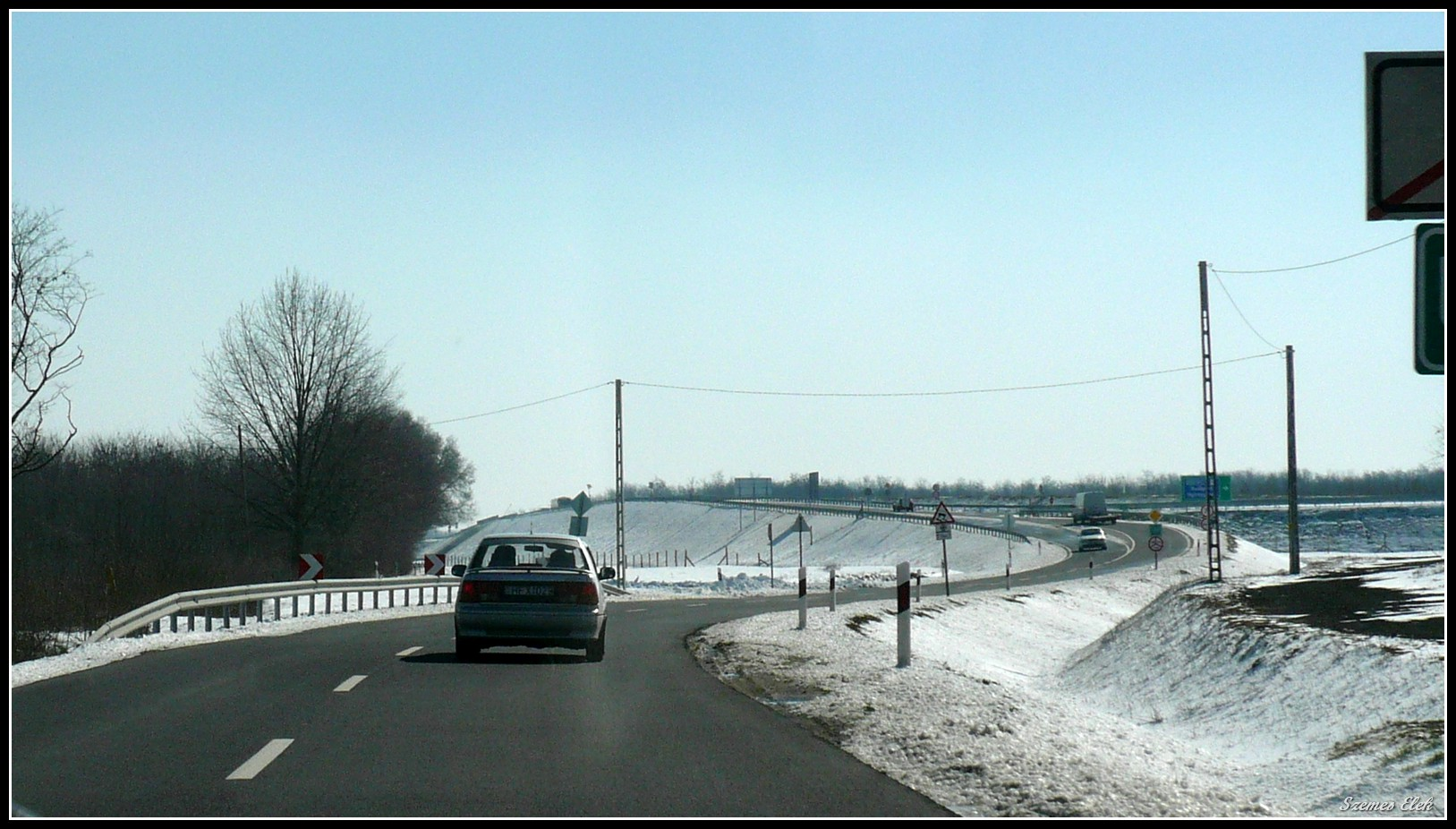

- Coat of arms

- Location within Hungary
- Coordinates: 47°59′N 22°12′E
- Country: Hungary
- County: Szabolcs-Szatmár-Bereg

Area
  - Total: 17.78 km^{2} (6.86 sq mi)

Population (2001)
  - Total: 1,380
  - Density: 77.62/km^{2} (201.0/sq mi)
- Time zone: UTC+1 (CET)
  - Summer (DST): UTC+2 (CEST)
- Postal code: 4336
- Area code: 44

Őr is a village in Szabolcs-Szatmár-Bereg county, in the Northern Great Plain region of eastern Hungary.

== Geography ==
It covers an area of 17.78 km^{2} (7 sq mi) and has a population of 1380 people (2001).
