= Penészlek =

Coordinates: 47°38′N 22°09′E

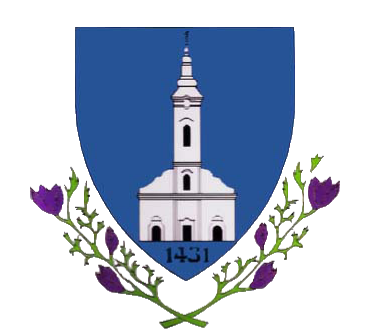
- Coat of arms
- Interactive map of Penészlek
- Country: Hungary
- County: Szabolcs-Szatmár-Bereg

Area
  - Total: 36.92 km^{2} (14.25 sq mi)

Population (2015)
  - Total: 1,037
  - Density: 28.1/km^{2} (73/sq mi)
- Time zone: UTC+1 (CET)
  - Summer (DST): UTC+2 (CEST)
- Postal code: 4267
- Area code: 42

Location of Szabolcs-Szatmar-Bereg county in Hungary

Penészlek is a village in Szabolcs-Szatmár-Bereg county, in the Northern Great Plain region of eastern Hungary.

== Geography ==
It covers an area of 36.92 km^{2} (14 sq mi) and has a population of 1037 people (2015).
