= Szabolcs-Szatmár-Bereg County 5th constituency =

- Constituency for the National Assembly
- Location of Szabolcs-Szatmár-Bereg county 05 within Szabolcs-Szatmár-Bereg county

- Location of Szabolcs-Szatmár-Bereg county within Hungary
- County: Szabolcs-Szatmár-Bereg County
- Population: 87,421 (2022)
- Major settlements: Mátészalka

Current constituency
- Created: 2011
- Party: Fidesz–KDNP
- Member: Sándor Kovács
- Elected: 2014, 2018, 2022, 2026

The Szabolcs-Szatmár-Bereg County 5th parliamentary constituency is one of the 106 constituencies into which the territory of Hungary is divided by Act CCIII of 2011, and in which voters can elect one member of the National Assembly. The standard abbreviation of the constituency name is: Szabolcs-Szatmár-Bereg 05. OEVK. The seat is: Mátészalka.

The constituency includes 44 settlements, of which 6 are urban and 38 are village or large village status. The majority of the constituency consists of small settlements.

In 2022, the constituency had a population of 87,421, and the district is characterized by a decreasing population. The number of residents eligible to vote was 71,023 in December 2025. Based on its population structure, it is mainly rural and peripheral. Based on the income data for 2022, the majority of the constituency can be classified as lower-middle-income. A district defined by those with low and medium education according to the highest completed educational level.

Since 2014, the constituency has had a single representative, Sándor Kovács, a Fidesz-KDNP MP who has held his seat for four elections.

In terms of competitiveness, it can be called a safe seat for the ruling party (Fidesz-KDNP).

== Area ==
The constituency includes 44 settlements, of which 6 are urban, 5 are large-scale and 33 are village-level. The majority of the constituency consists of small settlements.

Város

1. Baktalórántháza
2. Csenger
3. Mátészalka
4. Nagyecsed
5. Nyírmada
6. Vaja

Nagyközség

1. Hodász
2. Levelek
3. Ököritófülpös
4. Porcsalma
5. Tyukod

Község

1. Apagy
2. Besenyőd
3. Csengersima
4. Csengerújfalu
5. Fülpösdaróc
6. Géberjén
7. Győrtelek
8. Jármi
9. Kántorjánosi
10. Kocsord
11. Komlódtótfalu
12. Laskod
13. Magy
14. Nyírcsaholy
15. Nyírjákó
16. Nyírkarász
17. Nyírkércs
18. Nyírmeggyes
19. Nyírparasznya
20. Ófehértó
21. Ópályi
22. Őr
23. Papos
24. Pátyod
25. Petneháza
26. Pusztadobos
27. Rápolt
28. Rohod
29. Szamosangyalos
30. Szamosbecs
31. Szamostatárfalva
32. Tiborszállás
33. Ura

Name	Party	Term	Election
Sándor Kovács	Fidesz-KDNP	2014 –	Results of the 2014 parliamentary election:
Sándor Kovács	Fidesz-KDNP	2014 –	Results of the 2018 parliamentary election:
Sándor Kovács	Fidesz-KDNP	2014 –	Results of the 2022 parliamentary election:
Sándor Kovács	Fidesz-KDNP	2014 –	Results of the 2026 parliamentary election: 49.66%

== Demographics ==
Historical population
Year	Pop.	±%
2011	93,646	—
2022	87,421	−6.6%

The demographics of the constituency are as follows. The population of constituency No. 5 of Szabolcs-Szatmár-Bereg County was 87,421 on October 1, 2022. The population of the constituency decreased by 6,225 between the 2011 and 2022 censuses. Based on the age composition, the majority of people in the constituency are middle-aged people with 29,740 people, while the fewest are elderly people with 15,510 people. 78.8% of the population of the constituency has internet access.

According to the highest level of completed education, those with primary school education are the most numerous, 21,593 people, followed by those with a high school diploma, 21,197 people.

According to economic activity, almost half of the population is employed, 37,437 people, the second most significant group is inactive earners, who are mainly pensioners, with 21,356 people.

The most significant ethnic group in the constituency is the Roma with 4,069 people and the Romanian with 314 people. The proportion of foreign citizens without Hungarian citizenship is 0.4%.

According to religious composition, the largest religion of the residents of the constituency is the Reformed (28,464 people), and a significant community is the Greek Catholic (8,833 people). The number of people not belonging to a religious community is also significant (2,700 people), the fourth largest group in the constituency after the Reformed, Greek Catholic and Roman Catholic religions.

== Sources ==
- ↑ Vjt.: "2011. évi CCIII. törvény az országgyűlési képviselők választásáról". Nemzeti Jogszabálytár. Magyar Közlöny Lap- és Könyvkiadó Kft.
- ↑ KSH: "Az országgyűlési egyéni választókerületek adatai". Népszámlálás 2011. Központi Statisztikai Hivatal.
