= List of populated places in Hungary (Ny) =

This is a list of cities, towns and villages of Hungary

KEY: T = Town ; V = Village

Name	Rank	County	District	Population	Post code
Nyalka	V	Gyor-Moson-Sopron	Pannonhalmi	449	9096
Nyárád	V	Veszprém	Pápai	969	8512
Nyáregyháza	V	Pest	Monori	3,748	2723
Nyárlőrinc	V	Bács-Kiskun	Kecskeméti	2,398	6032
Nyársapát	V	Pest	Ceglédi	1,756	2712
Nyékládháza	T	Borsod-Abaúj-Zemplén	Miskolci	4,957	3433
Nyergesújfalu	T	Komárom-Esztergom	Esztergomi	7,676	2536
Nyésta	V	Borsod-Abaúj-Zemplén	Szikszói	70	3809
Nyim	V	Somogy	Siófoki	311	8612
Nyírábrány	V	Hajdú-Bihar	Hajdúhadházi	3,983	4264
Nyíracsád	V	Hajdú-Bihar	Hajdúhadházi	4,060	4262
Nyirád	V	Veszprém	Ajkai	1,888	8454
Nyíradony	T	Hajdú-Bihar	Hajdúhadházi	7,933	4254
Nyírbátor	T	Szabolcs-Szatmár-Bereg	Nyírbátori	13,389	4300
Nyírbéltek	V	Szabolcs-Szatmár-Bereg	Nyírbátori	2,997	4372
Nyírbogát	V	Szabolcs-Szatmár-Bereg	Nyírbátori	3,334	4361
Nyírbogdány	V	Szabolcs-Szatmár-Bereg	Ibrány–Nagyhalászi	3,060	4511
Nyírcsaholy	V	Szabolcs-Szatmár-Bereg	Mátészalkai	2,240	4356
Nyírcsászári	V	Szabolcs-Szatmár-Bereg	Nyírbátori	1,256	4331
Nyírderzs	V	Szabolcs-Szatmár-Bereg	Nyírbátori	623	4332
Nyíregyháza	county seat	Szabolcs-Szatmár-Bereg	Nyíregyházai	116,899	4400
Nyírgelse	V	Szabolcs-Szatmár-Bereg	Nyírbátori	1,178	4362
Nyírgyulaj	V	Szabolcs-Szatmár-Bereg	Nyírbátori	2,116	4311
Nyíri	V	Borsod-Abaúj-Zemplén	Sátoraljaújhelyi	447	3998
Nyíribrony	V	Szabolcs-Szatmár-Bereg	Baktalórántházai	1,146	4535
Nyírjákó	V	Szabolcs-Szatmár-Bereg	Baktalórántházai	972	4541
Nyírkarász	V	Szabolcs-Szatmár-Bereg	Baktalórántházai	2,383	4544
Nyírkáta	V	Szabolcs-Szatmár-Bereg	Mátészalkai	1,827	4333
Nyírkércs	V	Szabolcs-Szatmár-Bereg	Baktalórántházai	829	4537
Nyírlövő	V	Szabolcs-Szatmár-Bereg	Kisvárdai	742	4632
Nyírlugos	V	Szabolcs-Szatmár-Bereg	Nyírbátori	2,969	4371
Nyírmada	V	Szabolcs-Szatmár-Bereg	Baktalórántházai	4,771	4564
Nyírmártonfalva	V	Hajdú-Bihar	Hajdúhadházi	2,137	4263
Nyírmeggyes	V	Szabolcs-Szatmár-Bereg	Mátészalkai	2,712	4722
Nyírmihálydi	V	Szabolcs-Szatmár-Bereg	Nyírbátori	2,019	4363
Nyírparasznya	V	Szabolcs-Szatmár-Bereg	Mátészalkai	941	4822
Nyírpazony	V	Szabolcs-Szatmár-Bereg	Nyíregyházai	3,230	4531
Nyírpilis	V	Szabolcs-Szatmár-Bereg	Nyírbátori	698	4376
Nyírtass	V	Szabolcs-Szatmár-Bereg	Baktalórántházai	2,183	4522
Nyírtelek	V	Szabolcs-Szatmár-Bereg	Nyíregyházai	7,146	4461
Nyírtét	V	Szabolcs-Szatmár-Bereg	Baktalórántházai	1,122	4554
Nyírtura	V	Szabolcs-Szatmár-Bereg	Nyíregyházai	1,794	4532
Nyírvasvári	V	Szabolcs-Szatmár-Bereg	Nyírbátori	1,959	4341
Nyomár	V	Borsod-Abaúj-Zemplén	Edelényi	313	3795
Nyőgér	V	Tolna	Sárvári	347	9682
Nyugotszenterzsébet	V	Baranya	Szigetvári	241	7912
Nyúl	V	Gyor-Moson-Sopron	Gyori	3,866	9082

== Notes ==
- Cities marked with * have several different post codes, the one here is only the most general one.
