= Baktalórántháza District =

Baktalórántháza District Baktalórántházai járás
- District
- Coat of arms

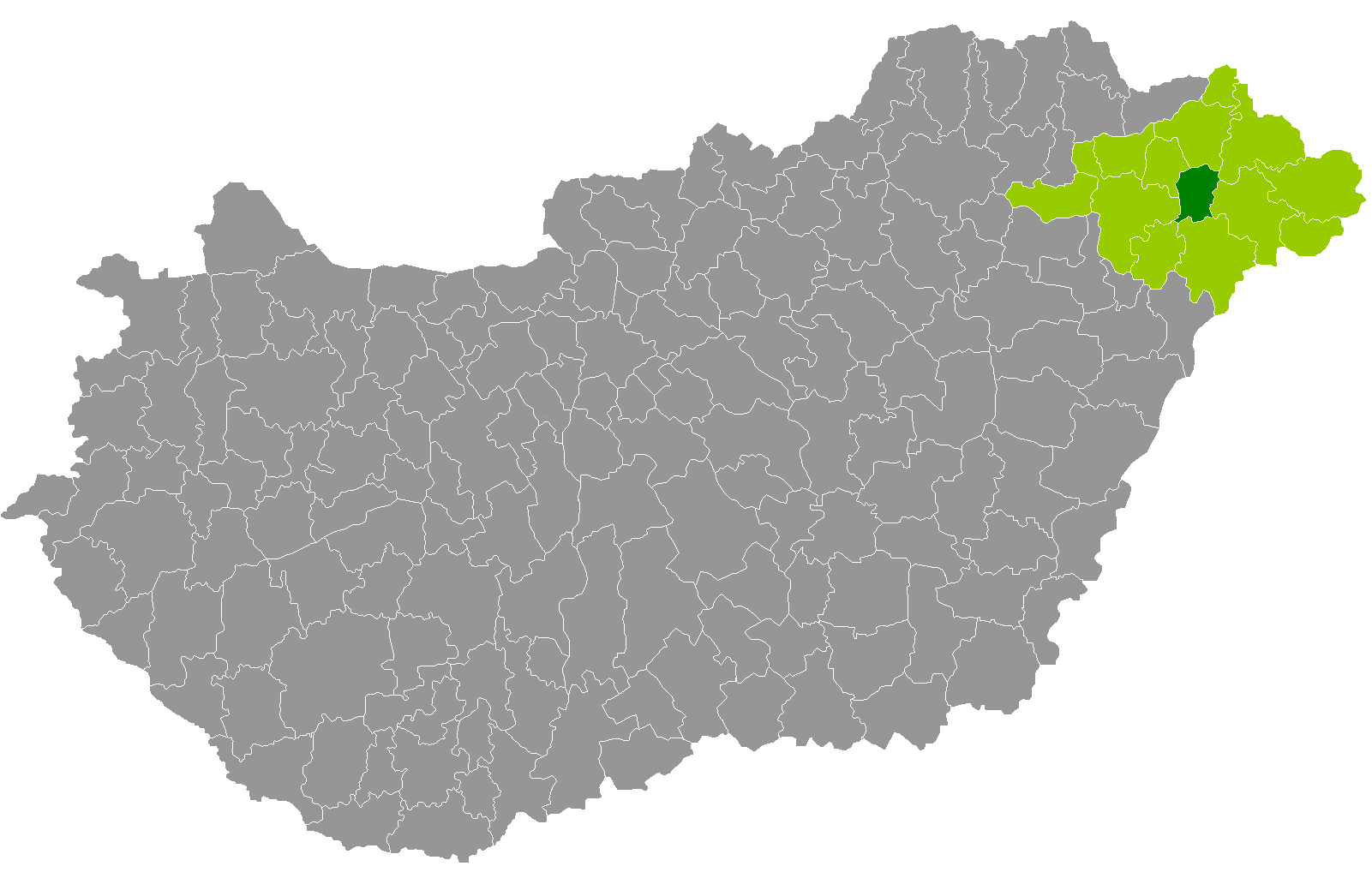
- Baktalórántháza District within Hungary and Szabolcs-Szatmár-Bereg County.
- Country: Hungary
- County: Szabolcs-Szatmár-Bereg
- District seat: Baktalórántháza

Area
  - Total: 254.47 km^{2} (98.25 sq mi)
  - Rank: 10th in Szabolcs-Szatmár-Bereg

Population (2011 census)
  - Total: 19,123
  - Rank: 11th in Szabolcs-Szatmár-Bereg
  - Density: 75/km^{2} (190/sq mi)

Baktalórántháza (Hungarian: Baktalórántházai járás) is a district in central part of Szabolcs-Szatmár-Bereg County. Baktalórántháza is also the name of the town where the district seat is found. The district is located in the Northern Great Plain Statistical Region. This district is a part of Nyírség geographical region.

== Geography ==
Baktalórántháza District borders with Kisvárda District to the north, Vásárosnamény District and Mátészalka District to the east, Nyírbátor District and Nagykálló District to the south, Nyíregyháza District and Kemecse District to the west. The number of the inhabited places in Baktalórántháza District is 12.

== Municipalities ==
The district has 1 town, 1 large village and 10 villages. (ordered by population, as of 1 January 2013)

- **Baktalórántháza** (4,037) – district seat
- Besenyőd (681)
- Laskod (995)
- Levelek (2,956)
- Magy (922)
- Nyíribrony (1,080)
- Nyírjákó (895)
- Nyírkércs (826)
- Ófehértó (2,587)
- Petneháza (1,790)
- Ramocsaháza (1,529)
- Rohod (1,223)

The bolded municipality is city, italics municipality is large village.

== Demographics ==
Religion in Baktalórántháza District (2011 census)
1. Catholic Church (22.5%)
2. Greek Catholicism (18.8%)
3. Calvinism (36.0%)
4. Lutheranism (0.20%)
5. Other religions (1.70%)
6. Non-religious (3.00%)
7. Atheists (0.10%)
8. Undeclared (17.7%)

In 2011, it had a population of 19,123 and the population density was 75/km².

Year	County population	Change
2011	19,123	n/a

=== Ethnicity ===
Besides the Hungarian majority, the main minority is the Roma (approx. 2,000).

Total population (2011 census): 19,123
Ethnic groups (2011 census): Identified themselves: 19,254 persons:

- Hungarians: 17,144 (89.04%)
- Romani: 1,942 (10.09%)
- Others and indefinable: 168 (0.87%)

Approx. 150 persons in Baktalórántháza District did declare more than one ethnic group at the 2011 census.

=== Religion ===
Religious adherence in the county according to 2011 census:

- Catholic – 7,893 (Roman Catholic – 4,302; Greek Catholic – 3,590);
- Reformed – 6,893;
- Evangelical – 44;
- other religions – 334;
- Non-religious – 565;
- Atheism – 20;
- Undeclared – 3,374.

== Gallery ==
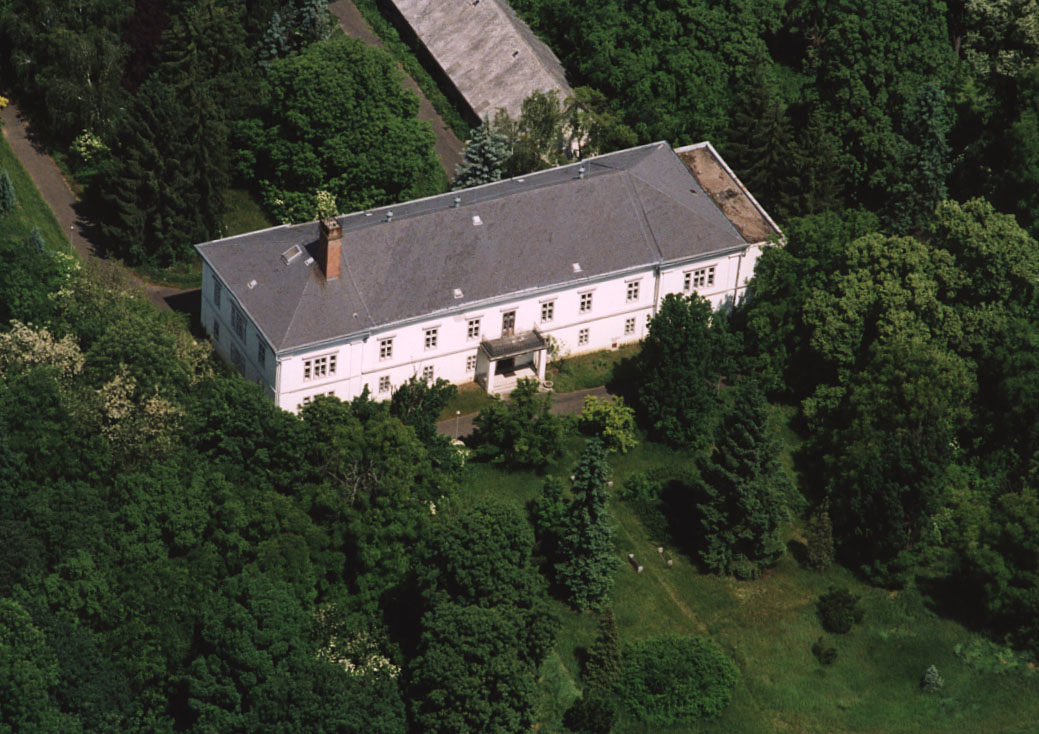
Dégenfeld Mansion in Baktalórántháza

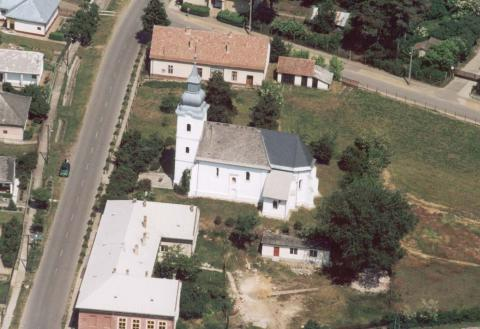
Aerial view of Ófehértó

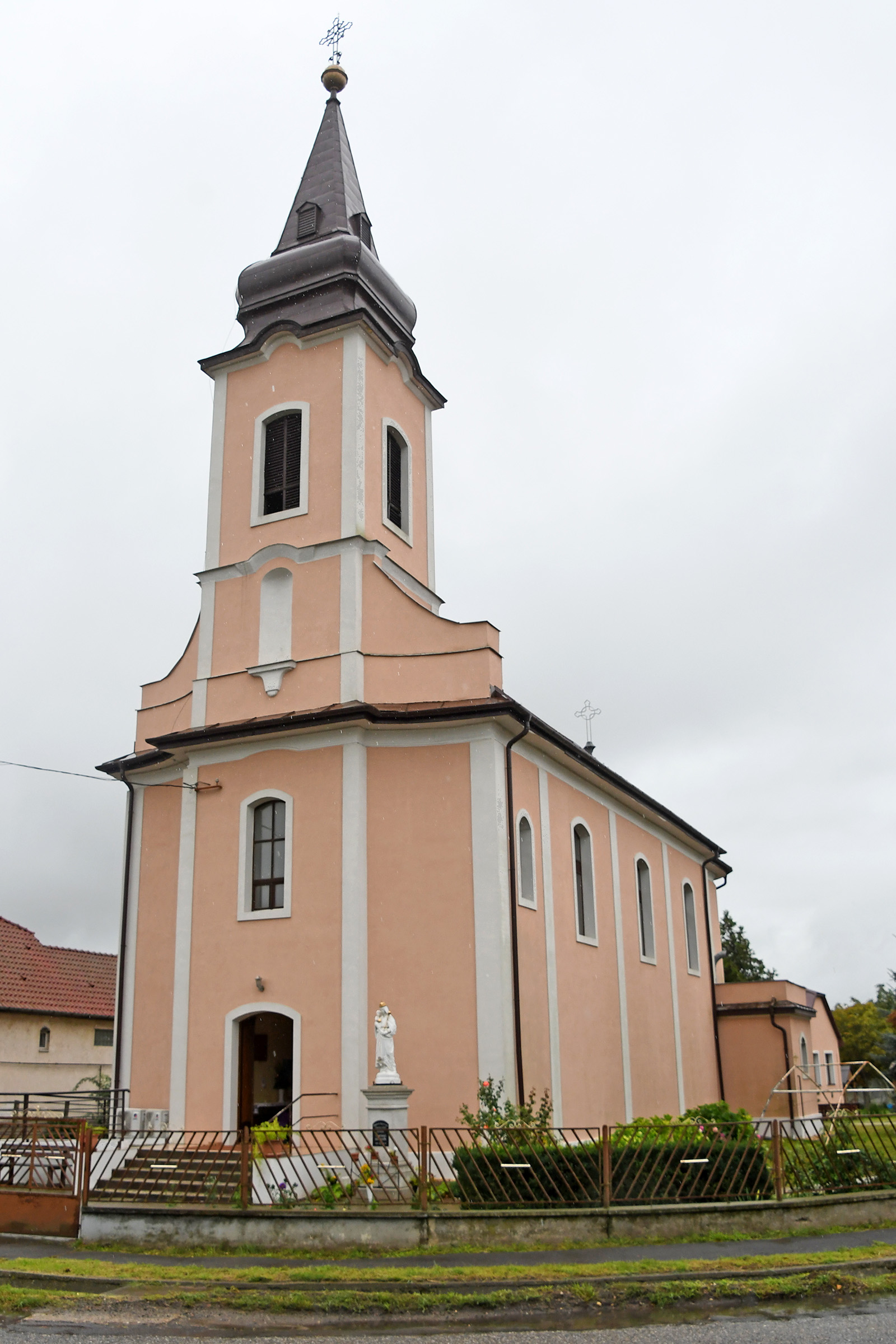
Roman Catholic church of Ramocsaháza

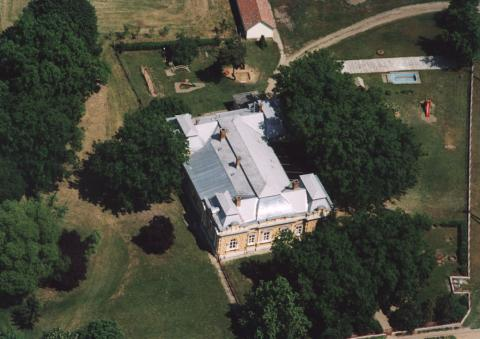
Molnár Mansion in Levelek

== See also ==
- List of cities and towns of Hungary
