= Kállósemjén =

Coordinates: 47°52′N 21°56′E

- Flag Coat of arms
- Interactive map of Kállósemjén
- Country: Hungary
- County: Szabolcs-Szatmár-Bereg

Area
  - Total: 54.52 km^{2} (21.05 sq mi)

Population (2015)
  - Total: 3,537
  - Density: 73/km^{2} (190/sq mi)
- Time zone: UTC+1 (CET)
  - Summer (DST): UTC+2 (CEST)
- Postal code: 4324
- Area code: 42

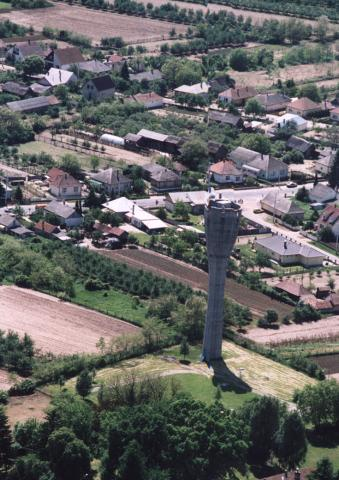
Aerial photography of Kállósemjén

Location of Szabolcs-Szatmar-Bereg county in Hungary

Kállósemjén is a village in Szabolcs-Szatmár-Bereg county, in the Northern Great Plain region of eastern Hungary.

22 km from Nyíregyháza, 8 km from Nagykálló, 10 km from Balkány (dirt road), 16 km from Levelek, 12 km from Magy, 17 km from Nyírbátor, 3 km from Pócspetri (dirt road), 10 km from Máriapócs.

== Geography ==
It covers an area of 54.52 km^{2} (21 sq mi) and has a population of 3537 people (2015).

== History ==
It is an ancient nest of the Kállay family of the Balogsemjén genus. The family who settled in the village built their estate center here and built the castle, which has since disappeared without a trace. There used to be two Semjén in the vicinity of Kálló: Kis- and Nagysemjén.

According to a charter from 1471, one of the two Semjén was written as Oppidum Semyen. In both semesters it was owned by the Kállay family. In 1446 the members of the Strittey family had property here. In 1454 it was owned by the Czudar family from Ónod.

In the 17th century, during the Turkish occupation, Greek Catholic Romanian serfs were settled in the wilderness at the beginning of the 18th century, and have since become completely Hungarian.

In the second half of the 18th century and the first half of the 19th century, in addition to the Kállay family, the Eördögh and Count Dessewffy families also owned it.

At the beginning of the 20th century, in addition to the members of the Kállay family, Tibor Kausay and Viktor, Gusztáv Kövér and Pálma, widow. Edéné Hegedűs, Ignácz Mándy, Márton Leveleki and Mór Klein were also owners here.

Prime Minister Miklós Kállay also lived here, and his ashes were brought back to the family crypt in 1993.

There are currently 41 hectares under protection at Lake Mohos.

The bog was formed by running sand at the end of the ice age, and today it is wedged between large sand dunes, formed by decay, 2-3 meters deep.

== Natural assets ==
Mossy lake (Hungarian name: Mohos-tó)

This is the last large swamp islands with peat fern, rare ancient swamp plants, seaweed varieties. The famous botanist Pál Kitaibel was already researching this part of the Nyírség at the end of the 18th century, but the first report was made about the bog in 1927 by Lajos Kiss, the former director of the Jósa András Museum in Nyíregyháza. A more serious excavation is connected to the name of Ádám Boros and then to Rezső Soó.

About 400 years ago, the climate became wetter, with forests settling in the vicinity of the inter-mound depression. At the end of the 18th century, forests were cut down, pastures developed, and dramatic changes took place as a result of the drier climate: the sand began to rise again, and with it the nutrient content of the forest entered the lake. This caused rapid swamping and then floating marsh formation. Due to the water management and sewerage of the area, the water level decreased further, due to which the thickened carpet of the floating bogs "sat down" and turned into a stable radish willow. Today, a well supplies water to the bog so that the original condition is maintained and changes in the weather do not endanger its survival. Although the largely willow area is not very spectacular for the uninitiated, experts appreciate it all the more.

Free to visit.
