= Nyírmihálydi =

- Village
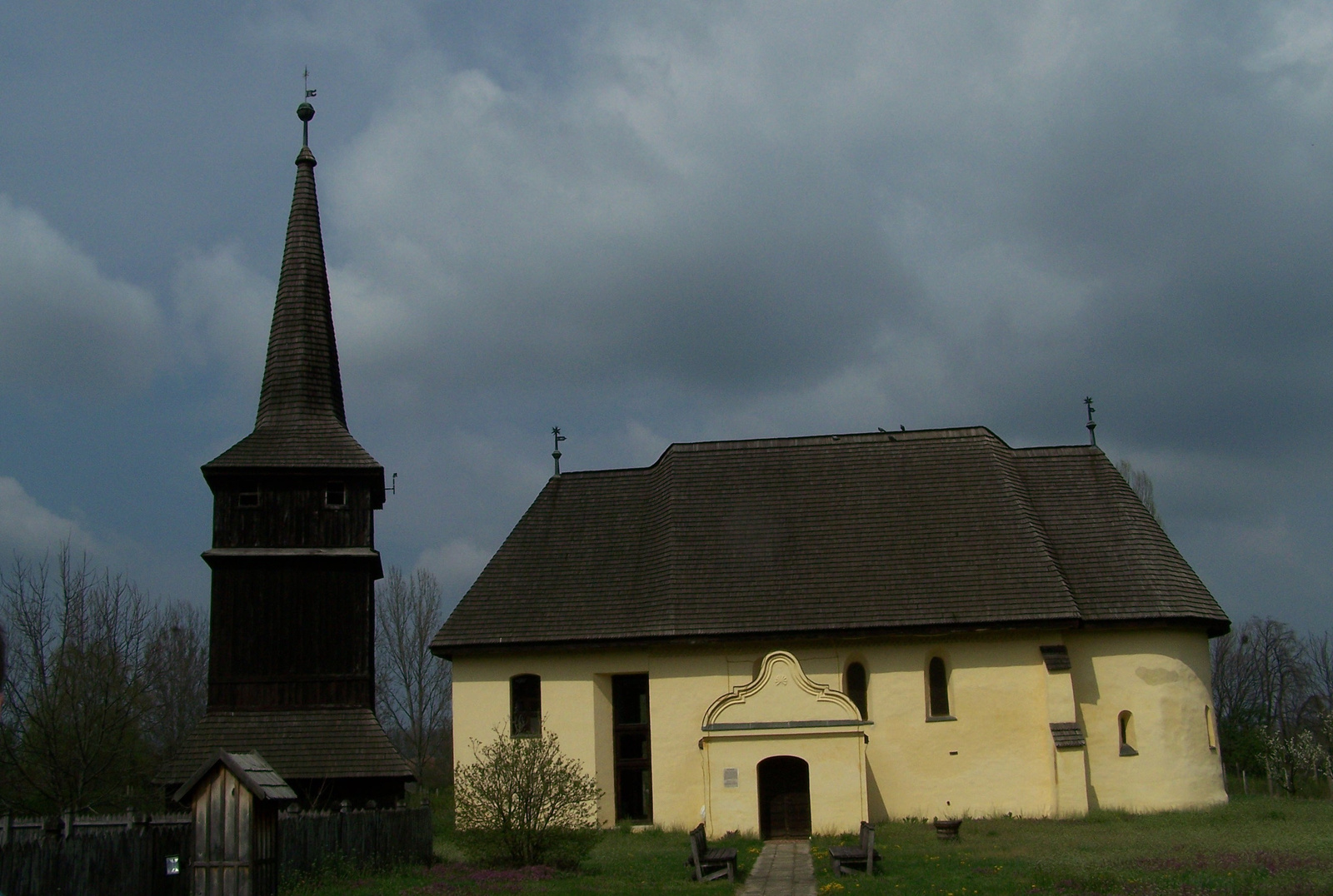
- Reformed Church

- Location of Nyírmihálydi in Hungary
- Coordinates: 47°43′57″N 21°57′40″E
- Country: Hungary
- Region: Northern Great Plain
- County: Szabolcs-Szatmár-Bereg

Area
  - Total: 25.5 km^{2} (9.8 sq mi)

Population (2011)
  - Total: 1,995
  - Density: 78.2/km^{2} (203/sq mi)
- Time zone: UTC+1 (CET)
  - Summer (DST): UTC+2 (CEST)
- Postal code: 4363
- Area code: +36 74
- Website: www.nyirmihalydi.hu

Nyírmihálydi is a village in Szabolcs-Szatmár-Bereg County, Hungary. As of the 2011 Hungarian census the village had a population of 1,995, an increase of 155 from 2001.

== History ==
The village has its roots in the time of the Árpád Dynasty. Its name first appears in the 13th century, and belonged to the Gutkeled clan. In 1372, Rakamazi Domokos of the Getkeleds traded the Nyírmihálydi for the village of Szakoly, and so the village came under the control of the Kállay family.

== Demographics ==
As of 2023, the village had a total population of 2123. This village is Hungarian, and as of 2022, the population was 53.9% Gypsy. The population was 40.0% Reformed, and 6.2% Greek Catholic.
