= Apagy =

Village in Northern Great Plain, Hungary

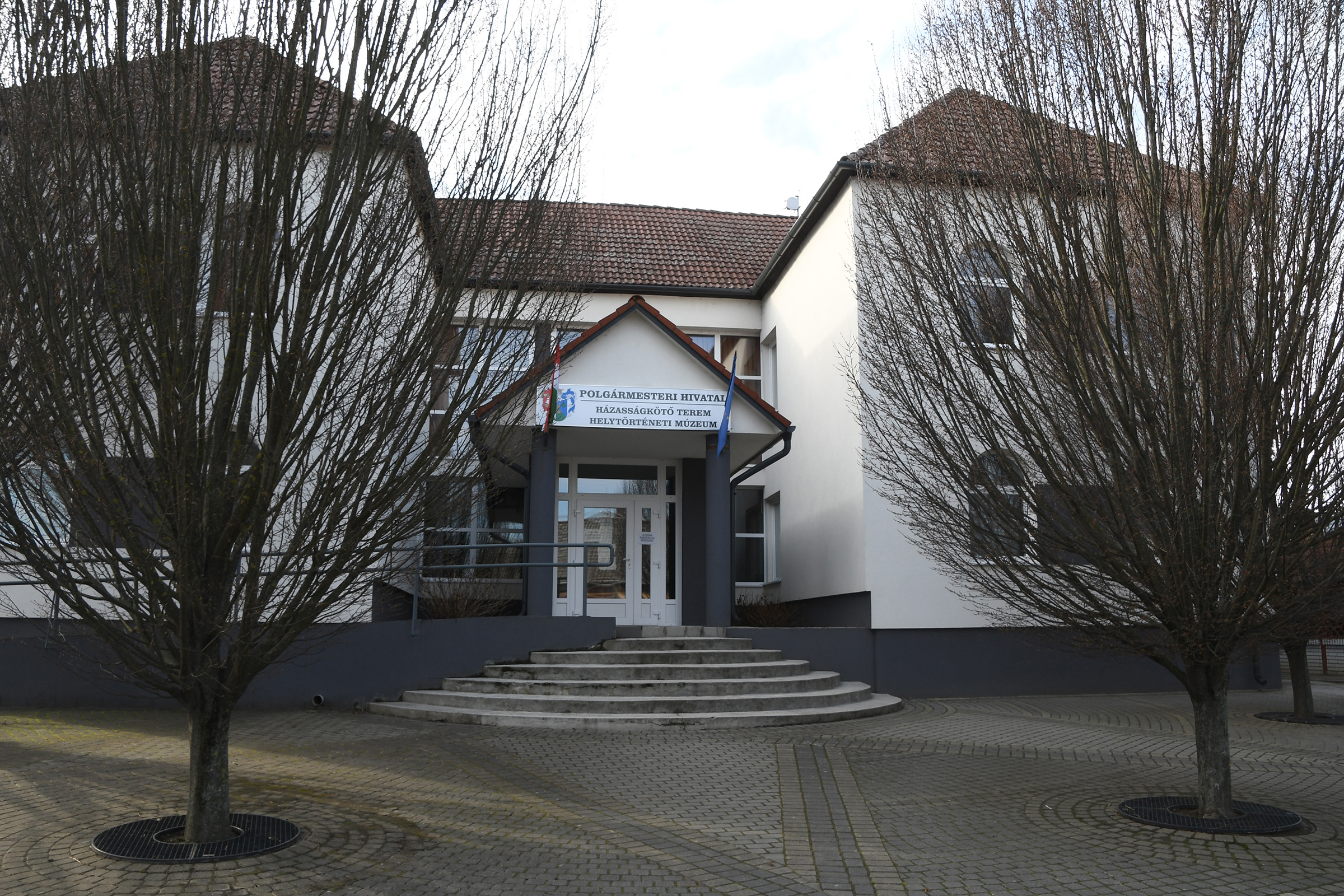
- Village hall

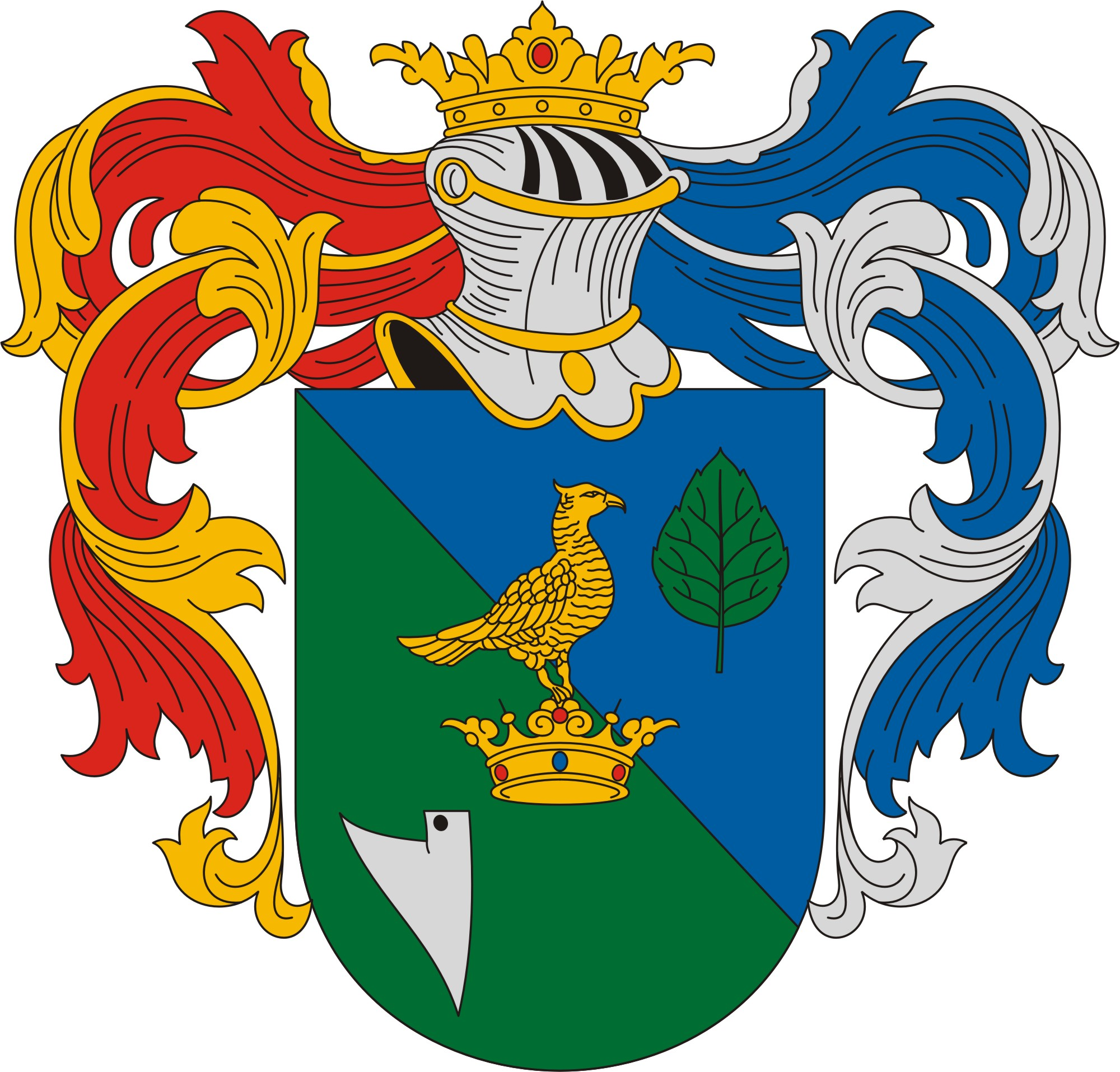
- Coat of arms

- Location of Apagy in Hungary
- Coordinates: 47.9573°N 21.9363°E
- Country: Hungary
- Region: Northern Great Plain
- County: Szabolcs-Szatmár-Bereg
- Subregion: Baktalórántháza
- Rank: Village

Area
  - Total: 32.04 km^{2} (12.37 sq mi)

Population (2009)
  - Total: 2,269
  - Density: 70.82/km^{2} (183.4/sq mi)
- Time zone: UTC+1 (CET)
  - Summer (DST): UTC+2 (CEST)
- Postal code: 4553
- Area code: +36 42
- KSH code: 20303
- Website: www.apagy.hu

Apagy is a village in Szabolcs-Szatmár-Bereg County in the Northern Great Plain region of eastern Hungary.

== Communications ==
Nyíregyháza lies around 17 kilometres (11 mi) to the west, connected by primary route 41.

The Vásárosnamény–Nyíregyháza line of the Hungarian State Railways (MÁV) serves the village.

== History ==
The village is first recorded in the 13th Century as Hungarian: Opag.

Because of its convenient location, Apagy became an important place of commerce and for holding county meetings. It was here that the decision was made to have Nyíregyháza as the county seat of Szabolcs County.

A charter of 1466 names Mohos as the neighbouring settlement of Apagy, and at that time it was owned by the Várday family.

At the start of the 15th century, the Kemecsey family became the owners. In the first half of the 16th century more families started to farm around Apagy: the Apagyi, Csajkos, Diószeghy, Hetey, Osváth, Puskas, Szegedy, Szentmiklóssy, Szécsy, Szilágyi and Zoltán families.

Apagy also held the 1608 Parliament.

The village started registering births, deaths and marriages in 1768.

The village really started to develop during the 18th century, and after the construction of the railway it became a local commercial hub.

At the start of the 20th century the Zoltán family (and descendants) farmed the land, and the major landholder was Mayer Leveleki.

Before World War II, there was a Jewish community in the town. At its height, there were 160 Jews in the community most of them were murdered by the Nazis in the Holocaust. The Jewish cemetery in the village still exists.

== Ethnic groups ==
As of 2009, the ethnography of the village was 99.9% Hungarian, with 1.1% Romani, adding to a grand total of 101%.

== Landmarks ==
- 15th-century United Reformed Church, in Gothic style, decorated and furnished in Art Nouveau style
- Lake Mohos Nature Reserve

== Sports ==
The local football team was founded in 1954. In the 1995–96 season they won the Hungarian National Championship VI and were promoted to the Hungarian National Championship V.
