= Nyírbogát =

Coordinates: 47°48′N 22°04′E

- Village
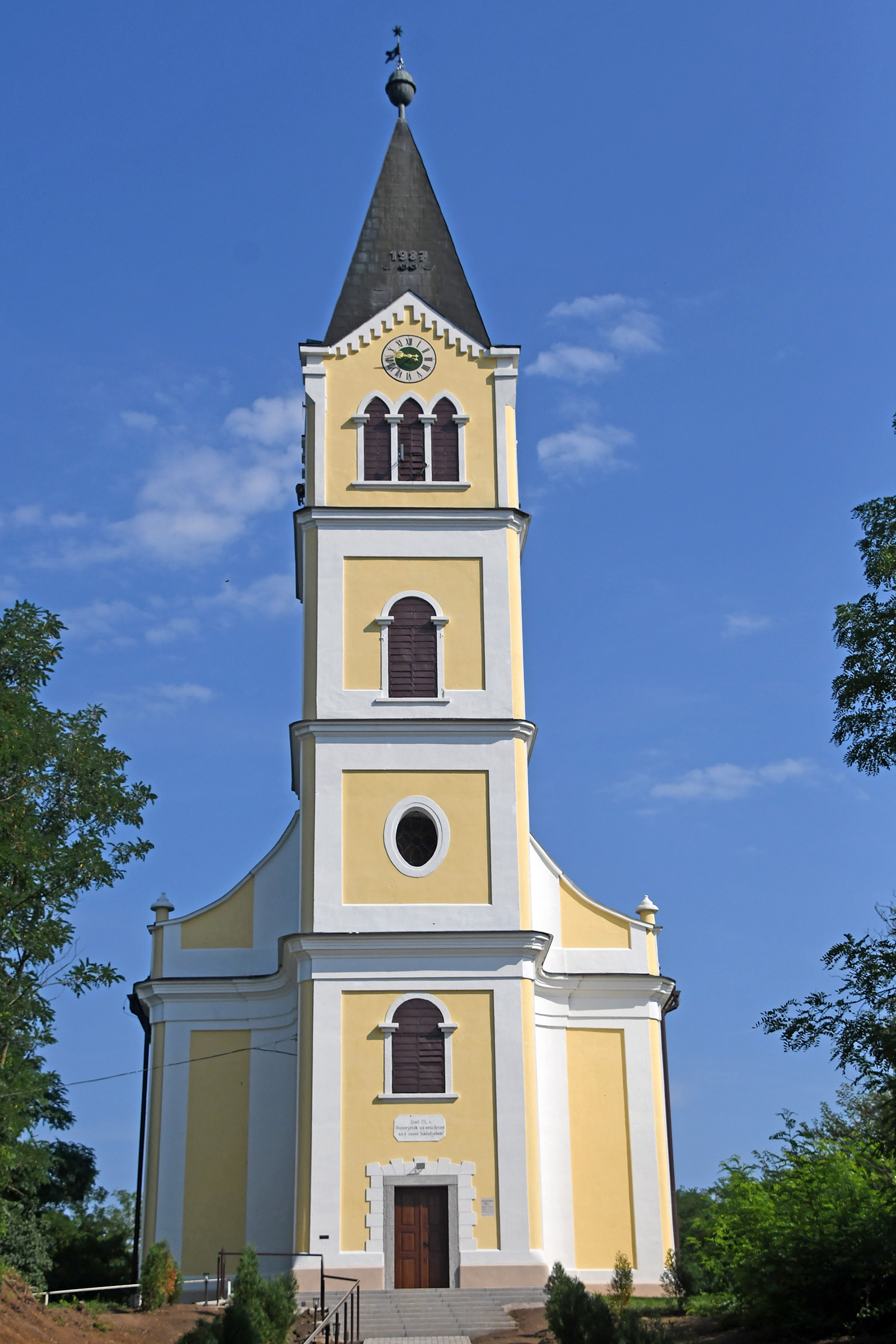
- Reformed church in Nyírbogát,

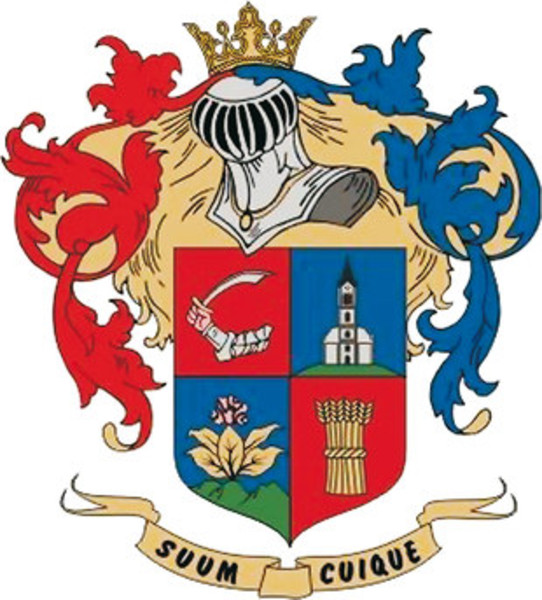
- Coat of arms
- Interactive map of Nyírbogát
- Country: Hungary
- County: Szabolcs-Szatmár-Bereg

Area
  - Total: 55.36 km^{2} (21.37 sq mi)

Population (2015)
  - Total: 3,105
  - Density: 56.1/km^{2} (145/sq mi)
- Time zone: UTC+1 (CET)
  - Summer (DST): UTC+2 (CEST)
- Postal code: 4361
- Area code: 42

Location of Szabolcs-Szatmar-Bereg county in Hungary

Nyírbogát is a village in Szabolcs-Szatmár-Bereg county, in the Northern Great Plain region of eastern Hungary.

== Geography ==
It covers an area of 55.36 km^{2} (21 sq mi) and, in 2015, had a population of 3105.

== History ==
The village has been the site of human habitation since the Stone Age. Its name first appears in writing in 1310, as the name of a local noble. Its earliest landowners were members of the Kállay family, who held titles to the village's land until the end of the 1300s.

== Demographics ==
As of 2022, the village is 94% Hungarian, 2.8% Gypsy, and 1.1% of non-European origin. The population is 34.6% Reformed, 20.3% Greek Catholic, 10% Roman Catholic, and 3.8% nondenominational.
