= Papos =

Coordinates: 47°59′N 22°15′E

- Interactive map of Papos
- Country: Hungary
- County: Szabolcs-Szatmár-Bereg

Area
  - Total: 10.67 km^{2} (4.12 sq mi)

Population (2015)
  - Total: 829
  - Density: 77.7/km^{2} (201/sq mi)
- Time zone: UTC+1 (CET)
  - Summer (DST): UTC+2 (CEST)
- Postal code: 4338
- Area code: 44

Location of Szabolcs-Szatmar-Bereg county in Hungary

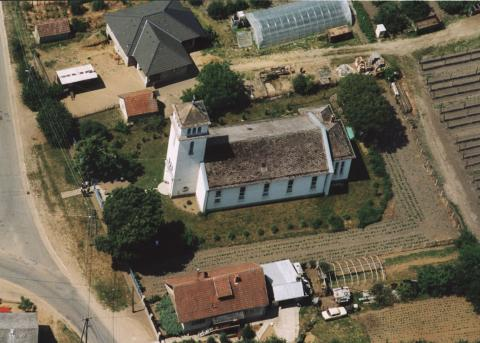
Aerial photography of Papos

Papos is a village in Szabolcs-Szatmár-Bereg county, in the Northern Great Plain region of eastern Hungary.

== Geography ==
It covers an area of 10.67 km^{2} (4 sq mi) and has a population of 829 people (2015).
