= Fülpösdaróc =

Coordinates: 47°56′N 22°30′E

- Interactive map of Fülpösdaróc
- Country: Hungary
- County: Szabolcs-Szatmár-Bereg

Area
  - Total: 4.25 km^{2} (1.64 sq mi)

Population (2015)
  - Total: 320
  - Density: 75.3/km^{2} (195/sq mi)
- Time zone: UTC+1 (CET)
  - Summer (DST): UTC+2 (CEST)
- Postal code: 4754
- Area code: 44

Location of Szabolcs-Szatmar-Bereg county in Hungary

Fülpösdaróc is a small village in Szabolcs-Szatmár-Bereg county, in the Northern Great Plain region of eastern Hungary.

== Geography ==
It covers an area of 4.25 km^{2} (2 sq mi) and has a population of 320 people (2015).
