= Nyírvasvári =

Place in Hungary

Coordinates: 47°49′N 22°11′E

- Village
- Coat of arms
- Interactive map of Nyírvasvári
- Country: Hungary
- County: Szabolcs-Szatmár-Bereg

Area
  - Total: 28.43 km^{2} (10.98 sq mi)

Population (2015)
  - Total: 1,964
  - Density: 69.1/km^{2} (179/sq mi)
- Time zone: UTC+1 (CET)
  - Summer (DST): UTC+2 (CEST)
- Postal code: 4341
- Area code: 42

Nyírvasvári is a village in Szabolcs-Szatmár-Bereg county, in the Northern Great Plain region of eastern Hungary.

== Geography ==
It covers an area of 28.43 km^{2} (11 sq mi) and has a population of 1964 people (2015).

== History ==
The village's name first appears in writing in 1318 as "Eghazas Wosvari" suggesting it already had a church by this time. Starting from 1318, the village belonged to the Báthory family of the Gutkeled clan.

In the 18th century the village was uninhabited, and was used as pastureland.

== Demographics ==
As of 2023, the village had a total population of 1829. As of 2022, the town was 91.4% Hungarian, 5.9% Gypsy, 0.8% German, and 1% of non-European origin. The remainder chose not to respond. The population was 43.4% Greek Catholic, and 11.9% Reformed, and 9.3% Roman Catholic.
