= Nyírtét =

Coordinates: 48°01′N 21°56′E

- Interactive map of Nyírtét
- Country: Hungary
- County: Szabolcs-Szatmár-Bereg

Area
  - Total: 17.17 km^{2} (6.63 sq mi)

Population (2001)
  - Total: 1,119
  - Density: 65/km^{2} (170/sq mi)
- Time zone: UTC+1 (CET)
  - Summer (DST): UTC+2 (CEST)
- Postal code: 4554
- Area code: 42

Nyírtét is a village in Szabolcs–Szatmár–Bereg County, Hungary. The nearest city is Nyíregyháza (25 km).

== History ==
The village was first mentioned in 1271. Its name is from the Turkish word "tigit".

Tradition holds that the Holy Crown was hidden here from the Austrians for a day.
