= Nyírlugos =

- Flag Coat of arms

- Location within Hungary
- Coordinates: 47°42′N 22°03′E
- Country: Hungary
- County: Szabolcs-Szatmár-Bereg

Area
  - Total: 58.38 km^{2} (22.54 sq mi)

Population (2015)
  - Total: 2,699
  - Density: 46.3/km^{2} (120/sq mi)
- Time zone: UTC+1 (CET)
  - Summer (DST): UTC+2 (CEST)
- Postal code: 4371
- Area code: 42

Nyírlugos is a town in Szabolcs-Szatmár-Bereg county in the Northern Great Plain region of eastern Hungary. It covers an area of 58.38 km^{2} (23 sq mi). Its population was 2699 as of 2015.

== Notable residents ==
- Balázs Dzsudzsák, Hungarian footballer

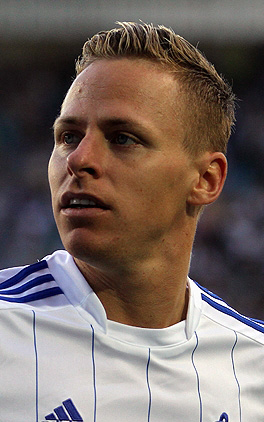
Balázs Dzsudzsák grew up in Nyírlugos.
