= Ramocsaháza =

Coordinates: 48°03′N 22°00′E

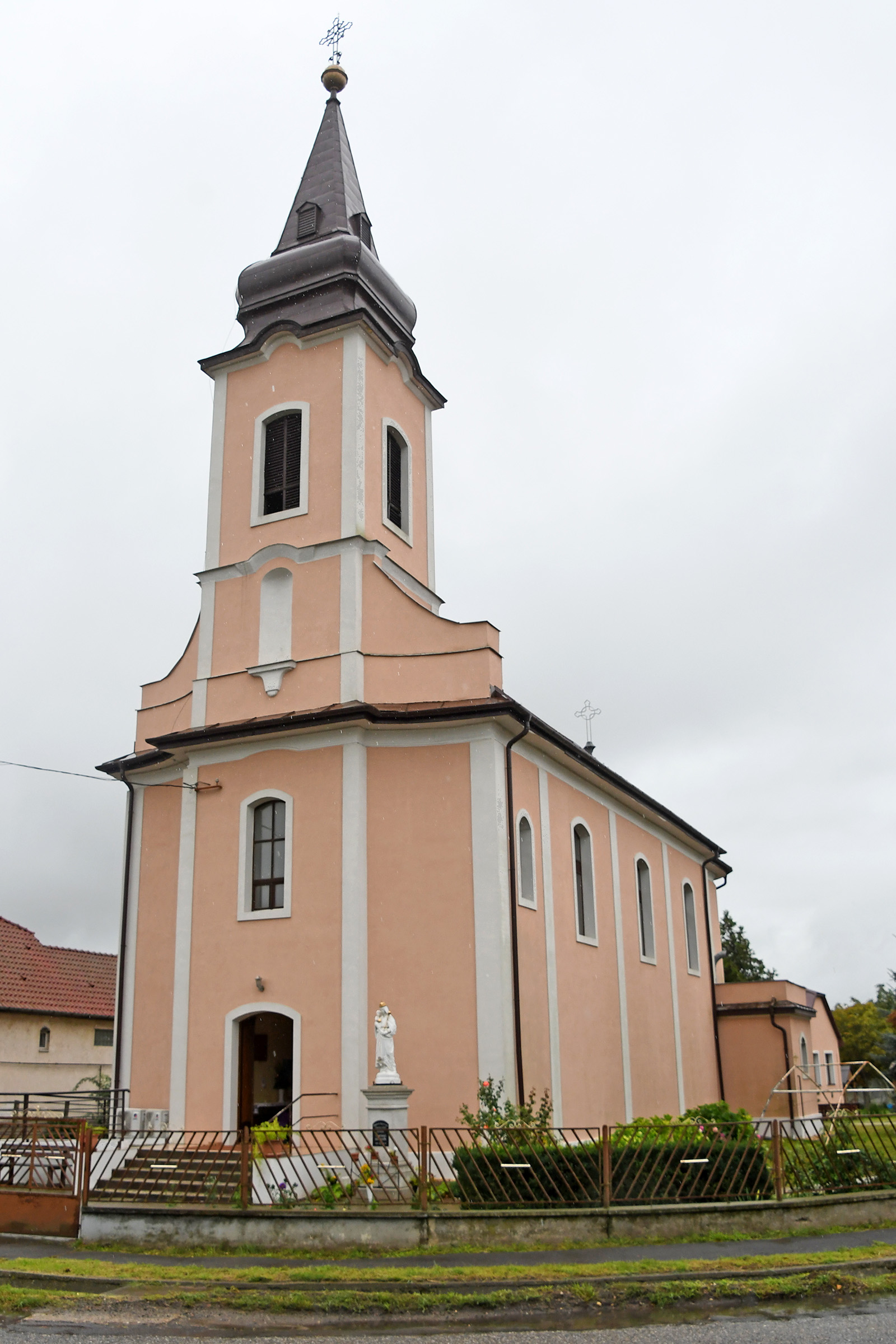
- Roman Catholic church in Ramocsaháza
- Interactive map of Ramocsaháza
- Country: Hungary
- County: Szabolcs-Szatmár-Bereg

Area
  - Total: 18.11 km^{2} (6.99 sq mi)

Population (2015)
  - Total: 1,517
  - Density: 83.8/km^{2} (217/sq mi)
- Time zone: UTC+1 (CET)
  - Summer (DST): UTC+2 (CEST)
- Postal code: 4536
- Area code: 42

Location of Szabolcs-Szatmar-Bereg county in Hungary

Ramocsaháza is a village in Szabolcs-Szatmár-Bereg county, in the Northern Great Plain region of eastern Hungary.

Jews lived in Ramocsaháza for many years until they were murdered in the Holocaust.

== Geography ==
It covers an area of 18.11 km^{2} (7 sq mi) and has a population of 1517 people (2015).
