= Pusztadobos =

Coordinates: 48°04′N 22°14′E

- Interactive map of Pusztadobos
- Country: Hungary
- County: Szabolcs-Szatmár-Bereg

Area
  - Total: 16.69 km^{2} (6.44 sq mi)

Population (2015)
  - Total: 1,535
  - Density: 92/km^{2} (240/sq mi)
- Time zone: UTC+1 (CET)
  - Summer (DST): UTC+2 (CEST)
- Postal code: 4565
- Area code: 45

Location of Szabolcs-Szatmar-Bereg county in Hungary

Pusztadobos is a village in Szabolcs-Szatmár-Bereg county, in the Northern Great Plain region of eastern Hungary.

== Geography ==
It covers an area of 16.69 km^{2} (6 sq mi) and has a population of 1535 people (2015).
