= Rápolt =

Coordinates: 47°55′N 22°34′E

- Interactive map of Rápolt
- Country: Hungary
- County: Szabolcs-Szatmár-Bereg

Area
  - Total: 3.23 km^{2} (1.25 sq mi)

Population (2015)
  - Total: 136
  - Density: 42.4/km^{2} (110/sq mi)
- Time zone: UTC+1 (CET)
  - Summer (DST): UTC+2 (CEST)
- Postal code: 4756
- Area code: 44

Location of Szabolcs-Szatmar-Bereg county in Hungary

Rápolt is a village in Szabolcs-Szatmár-Bereg county, in the Northern Great Plain region of eastern Hungary.

== Geography ==
It covers an area of 3.23 km^{2} (1 sq mi) and has a population of 136 people (2015).
