= Nyírtura =

Coordinates: 48°01′N 21°50′E

- Interactive map of Nyírtura
- Country: Hungary
- County: Szabolcs-Szatmár-Bereg

Area
  - Total: 21.48 km^{2} (8.29 sq mi)

Population (2015)
  - Total: 1,759
  - Density: 81.9/km^{2} (212/sq mi)
- Time zone: UTC+1 (CET)
  - Summer (DST): UTC+2 (CEST)
- Postal code: 4532
- Area code: 42

Location of Szabolcs-Szatmar-Bereg county in Hungary

Nyírtura is a village in Szabolcs-Szatmár-Bereg county, in the Northern Great Plain region of eastern Hungary.

== Geography ==
It covers an area of 21.48 km^{2} (8 sq mi) and has a population of 1759 people (2015).
