= Ófehértó =

- Village (község)
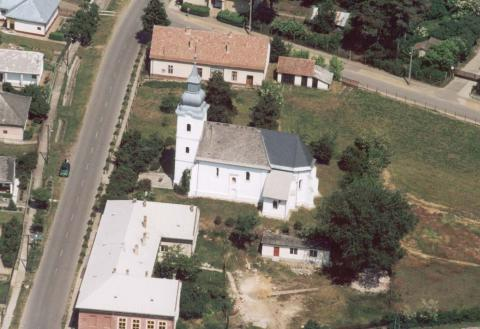

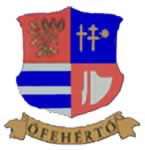
- Coat of arms

- Location of Szabolcs-Szatmar-Bereg County in Hungary

- Location of Ófehértó in Hungary
- Coordinates: 47°56′13″N 22°02′10″E
- Country: Hungary
- Region: Northern Hungary
- County: Szabolcs-Szatmár-Bereg County
- District: Baktalórántháza

Government
  - Mayor: Simon József (Fidesz-KDNP)

Area
  - Total: 43.17 km^{2} (16.67 sq mi)

Population (1 Jan. 2015)
  - Total: 2,551
  - Density: 59/km^{2} (150/sq mi)
- Time zone: UTC+1 (CET)
  - Summer (DST): UTC+2 (CEST)
- Postal code: 4558
- Area code: 42
- Website: http://ofeherto.hu/

Ófehértó is a village in Szabolcs-Szatmár-Bereg County, Hungary.
