= Szabolcs–Szatmár–Bereg County =

County of Hungary

Coordinates: 48°00′N 22°10′E

Szabolcs-Szatmár-Bereg County Szabolcs-Szatmár-Bereg megye
- Counties of Hungary
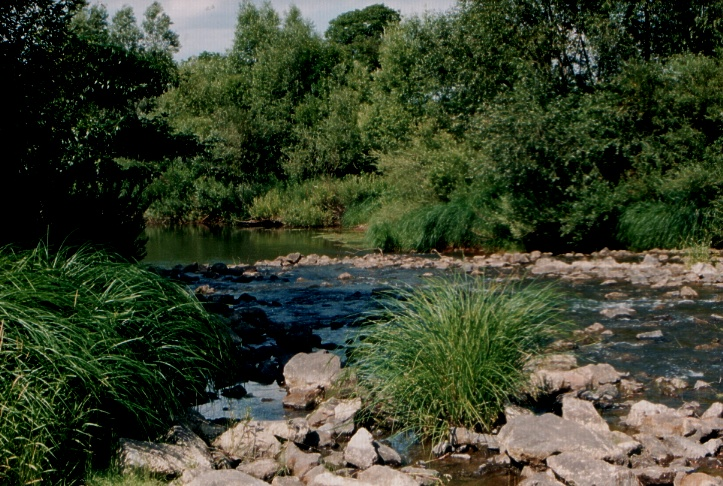
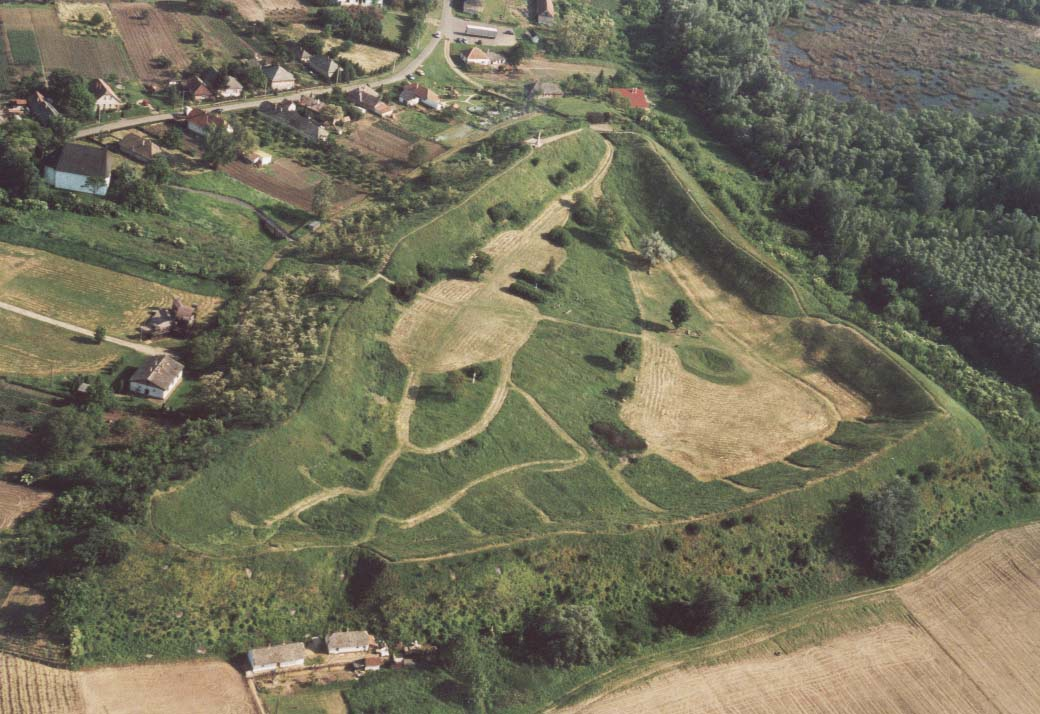
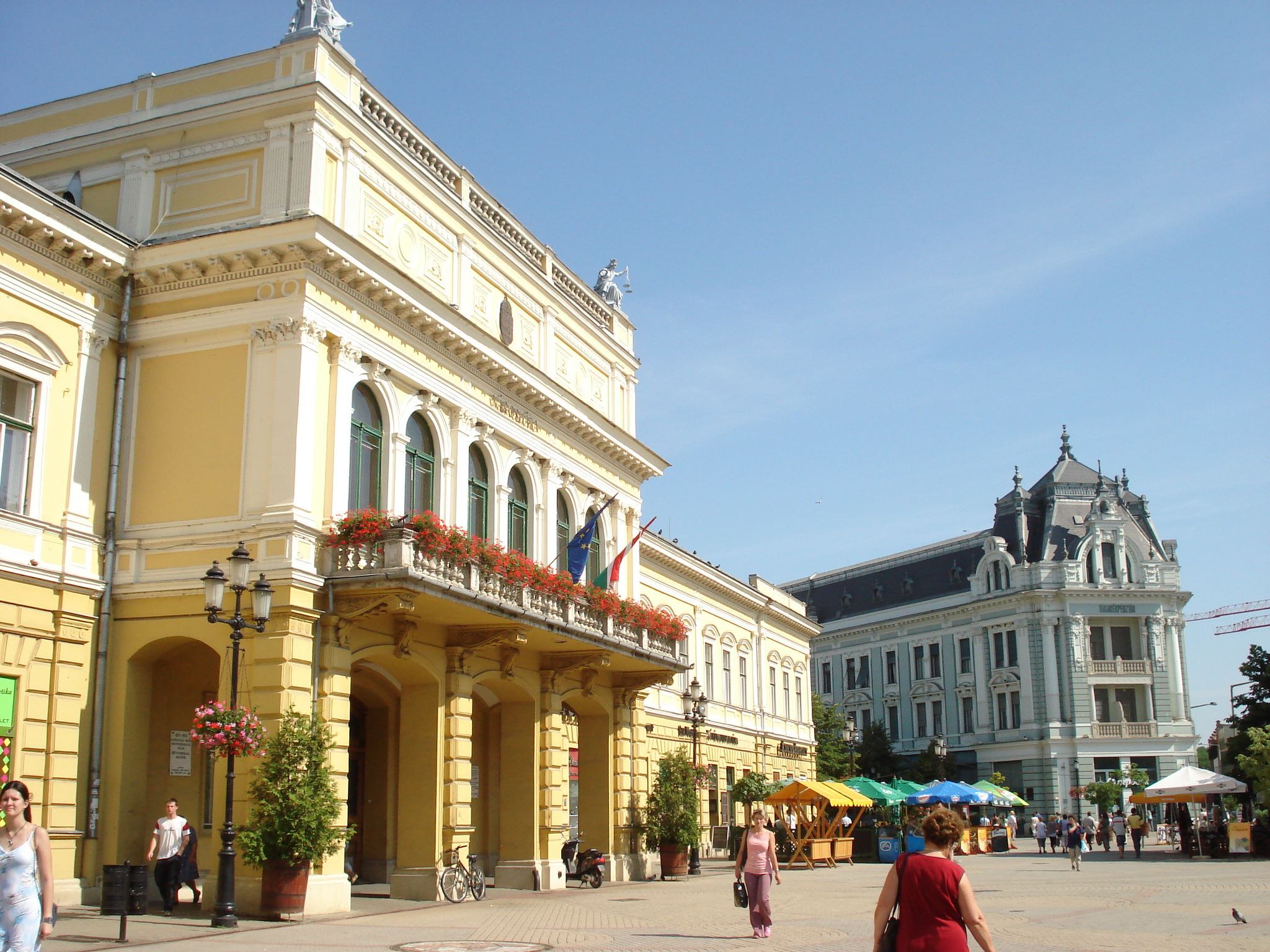
- Descending, from top: Tur river near Sonkád, Earthwork of Szabolcs, and Downtown of Nyíregyháza

- Flag Coat of arms

- Szabolcs–Szatmár–Bereg County within Hungary
- Country: Hungary
- Region: Northern Great Plain
- County seat: Nyíregyháza
- Districts: 13 districts: Baktalórántháza District; Csenger District; Fehérgyarmat District; Ibrány District; Kemecse District; Kisvárda District; Mátészalka District; Nagykálló District; Nyírbátor District; Nyíregyháza District; Tiszavasvári District; Vásárosnamény District; Záhony District

Government
  - President of the General Assembly: István Román (Fidesz-KDNP)

Area
  - Total: 5,935.83 km^{2} (2,291.84 sq mi)
  - Rank: 6th in Hungary

Population (2022)
  - Total: 529,381
  - Rank: 3rd in Hungary
  - Density: 89.1840/km^{2} (230.985/sq mi)

GDP
  - Total: HUF 1,149 billion €3.691 billion (2016)
- Postal code: 423x, 4244–4246, 4267, 43xx–49xx
- Area code(s): (+36) 42, 44, 45
- ISO 3166 code: HU-SZ
- Website: szszbmo.hu

Szabolcs–Szatmár–Bereg (Hungarian: Szabolcs-Szatmár-Bereg megye, pronounced [ˈsɒbolt͡ʃ ˈsɒtmaːr ˈbɛrɛɡ]) is an administrative county (Hungarian: megye) in northeastern Hungary, bordering Slovakia (Košice Region), Ukraine (Zakarpattia Oblast), and Romania (Bihor and Satu Mare counties). It shares borders with the Hungarian counties Hajdú–Bihar and Borsod–Abaúj–Zemplén. The capital of Szabolcs–Szatmár–Bereg county is Nyíregyháza.

Szabolcs–Szatmár–Bereg County was organised after World War II from the previous counties Szatmár–Ugocsa–Bereg and Szabolcs. Before 1991, it was called Szabolcs-Szatmár County.

== Geography ==
Szabolcs–Szatmár–Bereg is in the northeastern tip of Hungary. It borders Ukraine (Zakarpattia Oblast), Slovakia (Košice Region), and Romania (Bihor and Satu Mare counties), and has good connections both by road and rail. Within Hungary, the county is bordered by Borsod–Abaúj–Zemplén County and the Tisza River to the north-west and Hajdú–Bihar County to the south-west.

The early Hungarians transformed this region significantly by clearing large areas of forest to make way for pastures and farmland. Approximately 5 to 6 square kilometres of forest were cleared for the construction of the Szabolcs earthwork in the ninth and tenth centuries, and its ruins are still present. The area was the gateway for the Mongol invasion of Hungary in the 1240s, and suffered considerable destruction and population decrease during the raids. With the subsequent development of the country, the region became even more marginalized in the 15th century. Ongoing civil war, rebellion, and war exacted a heavy price and further hindered the region's development.

The county's borders have been altered frequently over the years, its current territory being established in 1950 with the amalgamation of the counties of Szabolcs–Ung and Szatmár–Bereg–Ugocsa.

There are many forests, fields, pastures, meadows, and moorland forests in the county. The bog moss moors at Csaroda, the Nyíres lake, and the Bábtava lake are especially valuable, as they contain many rare species of fauna and flora.

Szabolcs-Szatmár-Bereg is Hungary's sixth-biggest county with a total land area of 5,936 square kilometres (2,292 square miles). From a geographical aspect, it is possible to divide the county into two main regions: The Upper Tisza Valley and the Nyírség. Tisza is one of the most important rivers of the county, entering Szabolcs-Szatmár-Bereg — and Hungary — at Tiszabecs, and leaving at Tiszadob. Its segment in Szabolcs-Szatmár-Bereg county is 235 kilometres long, out of which 208 kilometres (129 miles) belongs to the Upper Tisza Valley, reaching the area of Tokaj and Rakamaz. The larger area named the Nyírség is derived from the word nyír meaning birch, as the region is dominated by birch woodlands. The northern part of Nyírség is covered with sandy forest soils, the southern areas have loose wind-blown sand. Alluvial and meadow soils are found in the Upper Tisza region.

The county has a continental climate; it is cooler than the Great Plain because it is further north. Summers are cooler than in other parts of the Plains. Annual precipitation is 550–600 millimetres. The higher than average number of days of sunshine make ideal conditions for the growing of tomatoes, sunflower, tobacco, apples, and other fruits such as plums—for which the county is famous, being eaten fresh, dried into prunes (some made into lekvar) and fermented into well-known brandies.

The county has 229 settlements, of which 20 are towns. The county capital and largest city is Nyíregyháza with a population of 116,900 in 2003. The other cities have relatively small populations, only those of Kisvárda and Mátészalka having around 18,000 inhabitants. The eastern part of the county is lightly populated and is dotted with small villages which often have very poor economic conditions.

== The Tisza River ==
The Upper Tisza region has many streams and rivers, but the Nyírség region has little surface water. The most important of the Tisza's tributaries is the river Szamos, which is also characterised by great variations in water volume. There are irrigation systems, a water barrage, and a hydroelectric power station on the Tisza at Tiszalök.

Lakes of various sizes have evolved in sandy areas such as the basin of the Sóstó (Salty lake) of Nyíregyháza, whose alkaline, hydrogen-carbonated waters have medicinal qualities. Many water reservoirs have been built according to local demand. Thermal waters of 55–65 °C can be brought to the surface from wells as shallow as 1,000 metres. The most important thermal water reserves are in Nyíregyháza, Kisvárda, Mátészalka, and Tiszavasvári. The county's geothermal energy still awaits exploitation.

The county has relatively few mineral reserves. Almost all of the large energy source transport systems cross the county.

== Demographics ==
Historical population
Year	Pop.	±%
1870	299,441	—
1880	288,327	−3.7%
1890	329,131	+14.2%
1900	384,060	+16.7%
1910	418,482	+9.0%
1920	435,119	+4.0%
1930	502,136	+15.4%
1941	546,639	+8.9%
1949	558,098	+2.1%
1960	586,451	+5.1%
1970	590,214	+0.6%
1980	593,829	+0.6%
1990	572,301	−3.6%
2001	582,256	+1.7%
2011	559,272	−3.9%
2022	529,381	−5.3%

The population of Szabolcs-Szatmár-Bereg County was 529,381 as of the 2022 Census, with a population density of 89 individuals per square kilometer (89/km^{2}). The number of households was 200,166 and the number of families was 142,636. Since the 2011 Census, the population decreased by 29,891 (-5.3%).

=== Ethnicity ===
In the 2022 Census, the majority (86.8%) of the population identified as Hungarian. A minority of 6.1% identified as belonging to another ethnic group and 10.8% of the population did not respond. The ethnic groups most identified with were Romani (5.1%), Ukrainians (0.3%), and German (0.2%). Small percentages identified as other domestic ethnic groups (0.4%) or other groups (0.2%). (Note: Individuals were able to identify with multiple ethnic groups, so the percentages may not add up to 100%.)

In the 2011 Census, 85.2% of the population identified as Hungarian. Nearly a tenth (8.9%) of the population identified as belonging to another ethnic group and 11.8% did not respond. Romani made up 7.9% of the population, German 0.3%, and Ukrainian 0.2%. Small percentages identified as other domestic ethnic groups (0.3%) or other groups (0.1%).

=== Religion ===
Religion in Szabolcs-Szatmár-Bereg County (2022 census – of those who declared their religion (66.7%))
1. Calvinistic (44.6%)
2. Roman Catholic (21.1%)
3. Greek Catholic (17.1%)
4. Lutheran (2.40%)
5. Faith Church (0.80%)
6. Other Christian denomination (2.50%)
7. Other religion (0.20%)
8. Not religious (11.3%)

In the 2022 Census, 59.2% reported that they were religious adherents. The largest religious communities were Calvinist (29.7%), Roman Catholic (14.1%), Greek Catholic (11.4%), Lutheran (1.6%), and Other Christian denomination (1.7%). Small numbers were affiliated with Orthodox Christianity, Judaism, and other religious groups (0.2%). The non-religious made up 7.6% of the population. A third (33.3%) of the population did not respond.

In the 2011 Census, 71.1% of the population were religious adherents. The largest religious community was Calvinist (34.6%). Others included Roman Catholic (19.4%), Greek Catholic (13.1%), Lutheran (2.0%), Other Christian denomination (1.7%). Small numbers were affiliated with Orthodox Christianity, Judaism, and other religious groups (0.2%). Atheists made up 0.4% of the population and other non-religious made up 7.9%. A fifth (20.6%) of the population did not respond.

In 1930, the population was 47.1% Calvinist, 23.6% Roman Catholic, 18.0% Greek Catholic, 6.7% Jewish, 4.4% Lutheran, and others (0.2%).

== Regional structure ==
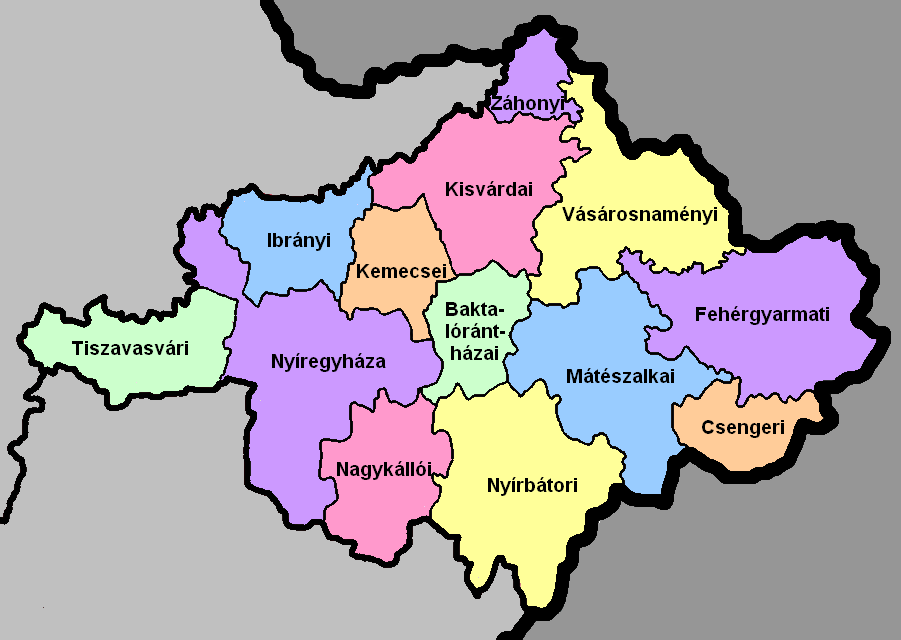
Districts of Szabolcs-Szatmár-Bereg County

No.	English and Hungarian names	Area (km²)	Population (2022)	Density (pop./km²)	Seat	No. of municipalities
1	Baktalórántháza District; Baktalórántházai járás	254.47	17,398	68	Baktalórántháza	12
2	Csenger District; Csengeri járás	246.51	12,538	51	Csenger	11
3	Fehérgyarmat District; Fehérgyarmati járás	707.37	35,358	50	Fehérgyarmat	50
4	Ibrány District; Ibrányi járás	304.91	21,954	72	Ibrány	8
5	Kemecse District; Kemecsei járás	246.41	20,618	84	Kemecse	11
6	Kisvárda District; Kisvárdai járás	523.09	51,413	98	Kisvárda	23
7	Mátészalka District; Mátészalkai járás	624.70	60,077	96	Mátészalka	26
8	Nagykálló District; Nagykállói járás	377.36	28,447	75	Nagykálló	8
9	Nyírbátor District; Nyírbátori járás	695.94	39,865	57	Nyírbátor	20
10	Nyíregyháza District; Nyíregyházi járás	809.61	162,969	201	Nyíregyháza	15
11	Tiszavasvári District; Tiszavasvári járás	381.61	26,260	69	Tiszavasvári	6
12	Vásárosnamény District; Vásárosnaményi járás	617.94	34,880	56	Vásárosnamény	28
13	Záhony District; Záhonyi járás	145.95	17,604	121	Záhony	11
Szabolcs–Szatmár–Bereg County		5,935.83	529,381	89	Nyíregyháza	229

== Economy ==
The county borders three countries, and it is the only Hungarian county bordering Ukraine. The railway border crossing toward Ukraine is well developed; its high capacity is able to meet the requirements of transit and bilateral trade. Following the reconstruction of the road border crossing, the county is also able to cope with increased road transportation.

Several regions in the county have tourism potential, mostly unexploited. Szabolcs–Szatmár–Bereg has several agricultural products of excellent quality, with capacity for higher production. There is an abundance of low-cost, semiskilled labour.

The county's biggest problem is the economic crisis. There is a shortage of local capital and inward investment, which restrains the creation of new jobs, thus the unemployment rate remains the second highest in Hungary. Manufacturing lags the rest of the country, most notably lacking high quality, high-value-added products. The marginal soil quality limits the scope of agricultural production to a few products which suffer from shrinking export markets to the east.

It is home to the Szakoly Power Plant.

== Politics ==
The Szabolcs–Szatmár–Bereg County Council, elected at the 2024 local government elections, is made up of 25 counselors, with the following party composition:

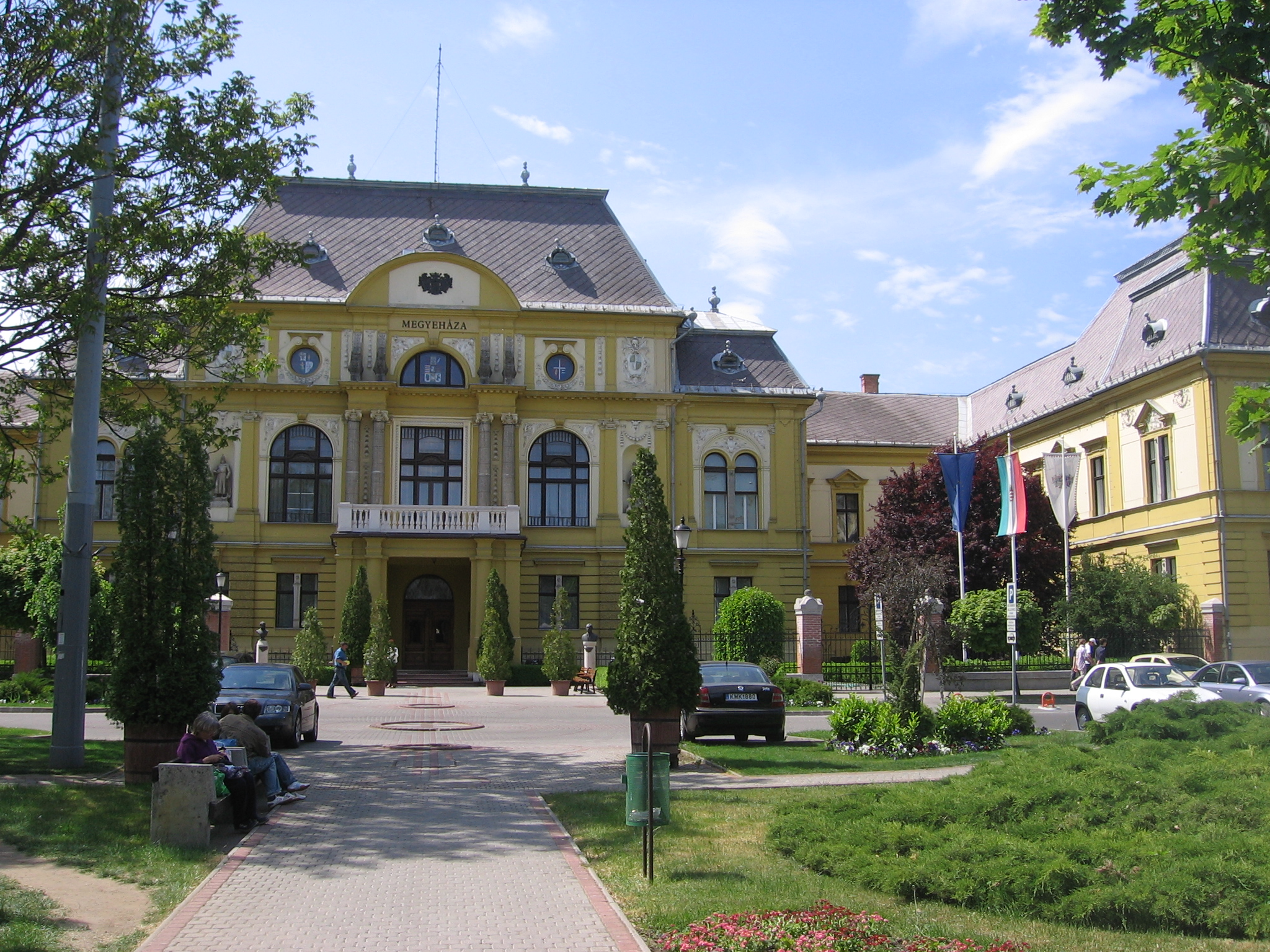
Countyhall of Szabolcs-Szatmár-Bereg

Party	Seats	Current County Assembly
Fidesz-KDNP	17	
Our Homeland Movement	4	
Democratic Coalition	2	
Association for Szabolcs-Szatmár-Bereg County	2	

=== Presidents of the General Assembly ===
List of presidents since 1990
Oszkár Seszták (Fidesz-KDNP)	2014–

== Municipalities ==
Szabolcs–Szatmár–Bereg County has 1 urban county, 27 towns, 15 large villages and 186 villages.

City with county rights

(ordered by population, as of 2011 census)

- Nyíregyháza (118,125) – county seat

Towns

- Mátészalka (17,195)
- Kisvárda (16,986)
- Újfehértó (12,931)
- Tiszavasvári (12,848)
- Nyírbátor (12,719)
- Nagykálló (9,702)
- Vásárosnamény (8,471)
- Fehérgyarmat (7,893)
- Ibrány (6,801)
- Nyírtelek (6,654)
- Balkány (6,387)
- Nagyecsed (6,374)
- Tiszalök (6,157)
- Nagyhalász (5,632)
- Csenger (4,853)
- Kemecse (4,755)
- Nyírmada (4,713)
- Rakamaz (4,555)
- Demecser (4,246)
- Mándok (4,191)
- Záhony (4,062)
- Dombrád (3,954)
- Baktalórántháza (3,916)
- Ajak (3,625)
- Vaja (3,608)
- Nyírlugos (2,789)
- Máriapócs (2,186)

Villages

- Anarcs
- Apagy
- Aranyosapáti
- Balsa
- Barabás
- Bátorliget
- Benk
- Beregdaróc
- Beregsurány
- Berkesz
- Besenyőd
- Beszterec
- Biri
- Botpalád
- Bököny
- Buj
- Cégénydányád
- Csaholc
- Csaroda
- Császló
- Csegöld
- Csengersima
- Csengerújfalu
- Darnó
- Döge
- Encsencs
- Eperjeske
- Érpatak
- Fábiánháza
- Fényeslitke
- Fülesd
- Fülpösdaróc
- Gacsály
- Garbolc
- Gávavencsellő
- Gelénes
- Gemzse
- Geszteréd
- Géberjén
- Gégény
- Győröcske
- Győrtelek
- Gyulaháza
- Gulács
- Gyügye
- Gyüre
- Hermánszeg
- Hetefejércse
- Hodász
- Ilk
- Jánd
- Jánkmajtis
- Jármi
- Jéke
- Kállósemjén
- Kálmánháza
- Kántorjánosi
- Kék
- Kékcse
- Kérsemjén
- Kisar
- Kishódos
- Kisléta
- Kisnamény
- Kispalád
- Kisszekeres
- Kisvarsány
- Kocsord
- Komlódtótfalu
- Komoró
- Kótaj
- Kölcse
- Kömörő
- Laskod
- Levelek
- Lónya
- Lövőpetri
- Magosliget
- Magy
- Mánd
- Márokpapi
- Mátyus
- Mezőladány
- Méhtelek
- Mérk
- Milota
- Nagyar
- Nagycserkesz
- Nagydobos
- Nagyhódos
- Nagyszekeres
- Nagyvarsány
- Napkor
- Nábrád
- Nemesborzova
- Nyírbéltek
- Nyírbogát
- Nyírbogdány
- Nyírcsaholy
- Nyírcsászári
- Nyírderzs
- Nyírgelse
- Nyírgyulaj
- Nyíribrony
- Nyírjákó
- Nyírkarász
- Nyírkáta
- Nyírkércs
- Nyírlövő
- Nyírmeggyes
- Nyírmihálydi
- Nyírparasznya
- Nyírpazony
- Nyírpilis
- Nyírtass
- Nyírtét
- Nyírtura
- Nyírvasvári
- Olcsva
- Olcsvaapáti
- Ófehértó
- Ópályi
- Ököritófülpös
- Ömböly
- Őr
- Panyola
- Pap
- Papos
- Paszab
- Pátroha
- Pátyod
- Penészlek
- Penyige
- Petneháza
- Piricse
- Porcsalma
- Pócspetri
- Pusztadobos
- Ramocsaháza
- Rápolt
- Rétközberencs
- Rohod
- Rozsály
- Sényő
- Sonkád
- Szabolcs
- Szabolcsbáka
- Szabolcsveresmart
- Szakoly
- Szamosangyalos
- Szamosbecs
- Szamoskér
- Szamossályi
- Szamosszeg
- Szamostatárfalva
- Szamosújlak
- Szatmárcseke
- Székely
- Szorgalmatos
- Tarpa
- Tákos
- Terem
- Tiborszállás
- Timár
- Tiszaadony
- Tiszabecs
- Tiszabercel
- Tiszabezdéd
- Tiszacsécse
- Tiszadada
- Tiszadob
- Tiszaeszlár
- Tiszakanyár
- Tiszakerecseny
- Tiszakóród
- Tiszamogyorós
- Tiszanagyfalu
- Tiszarád
- Tiszaszalka
- Tiszaszentmárton
- Tiszatelek
- Tiszavid
- Tisztaberek
- Tivadar
- Tornyospálca
- Tunyogmatolcs
- Túristvándi
- Túrricse
- Tuzsér
- Tyukod
- Ura
- Uszka
- Újdombrád
- Újkenéz
- Vasmegyer
- Vállaj
- Vámosatya
- Vámosoroszi
- Zajta
- Zsarolyán
- Zsurk

municipalities are large villages.

== Gallery ==
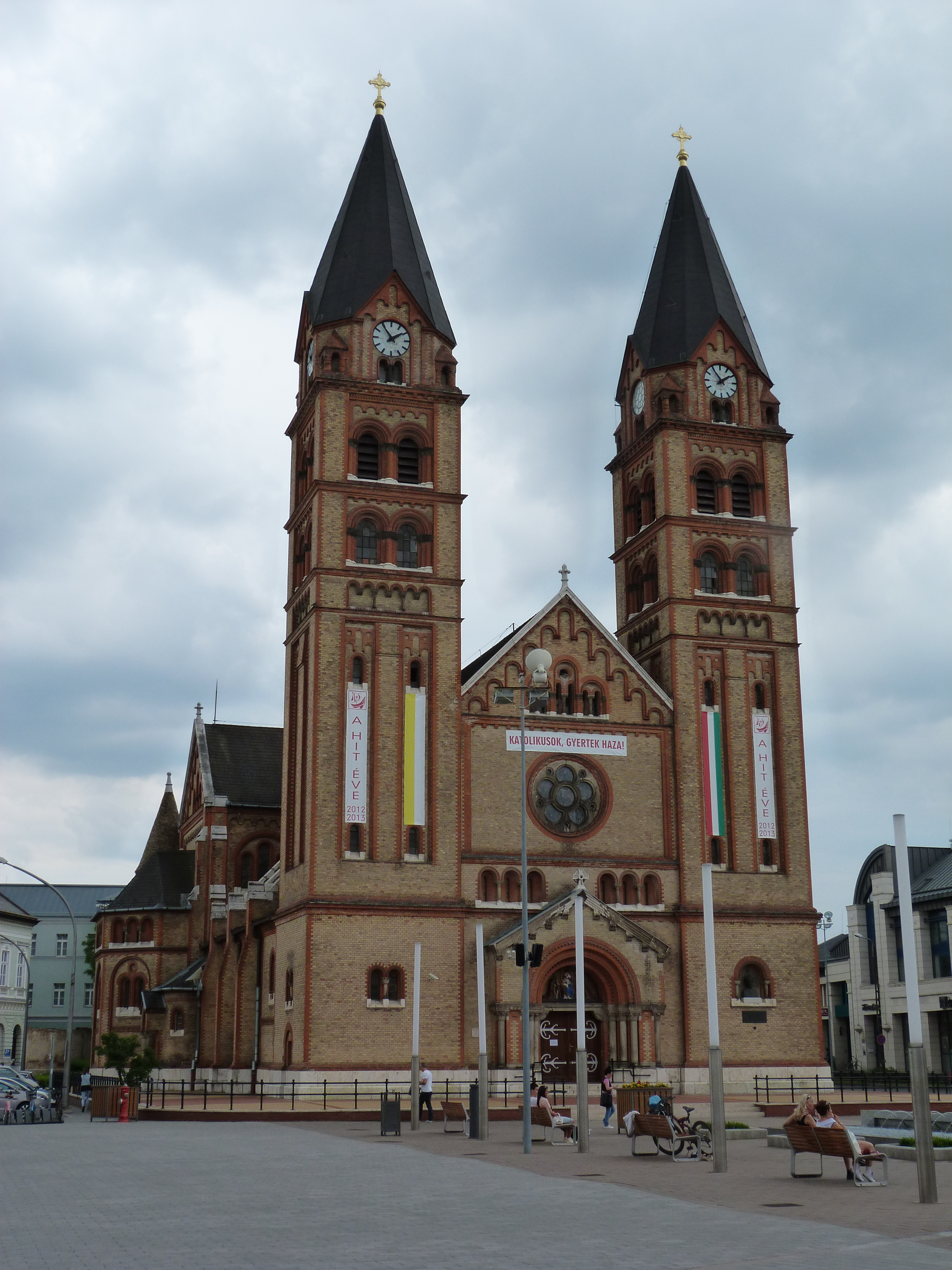
Latin Catholic church in Nyíregyháza, the capital of the county

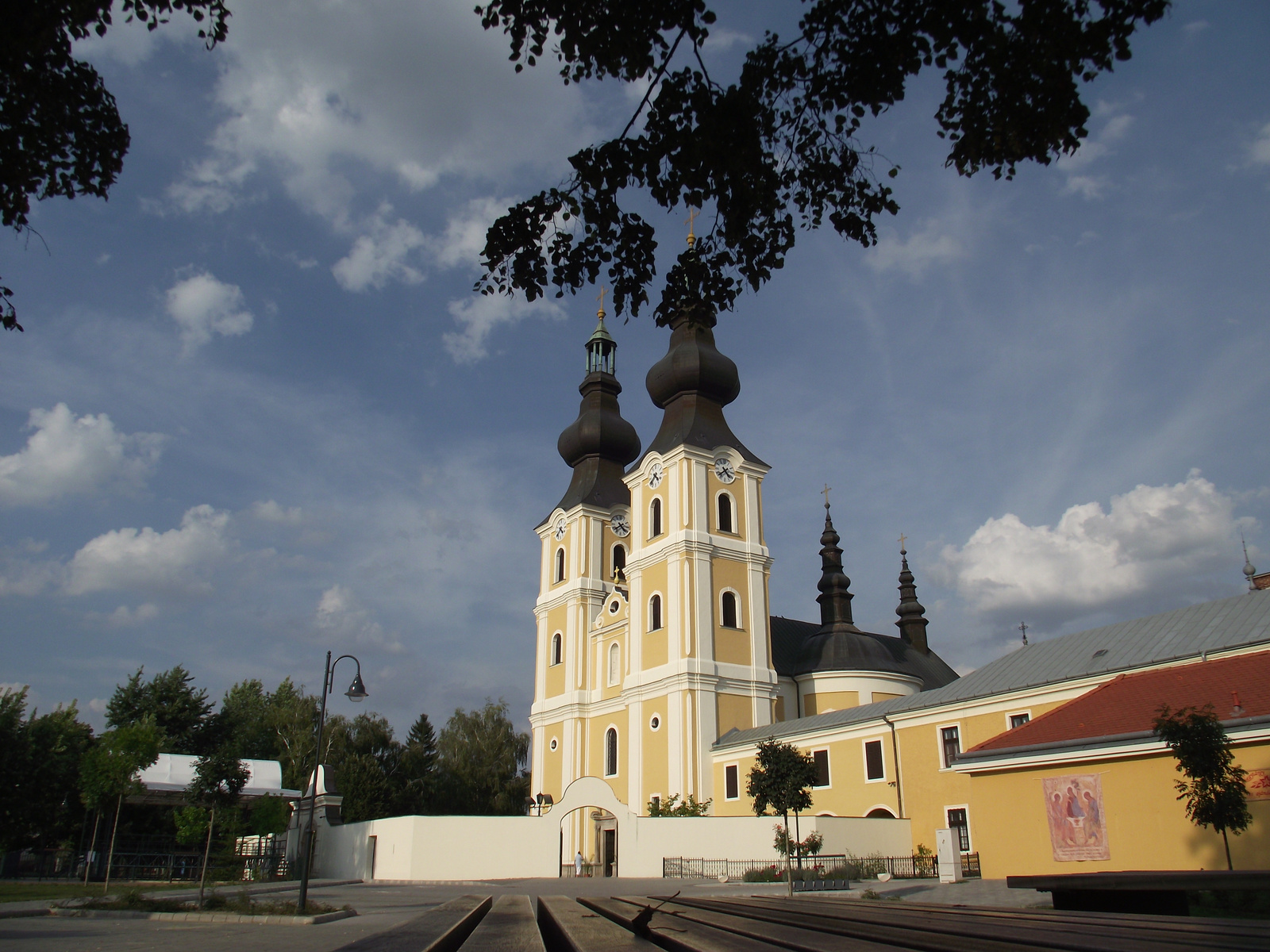
Greek Catholic church in Máriapócs

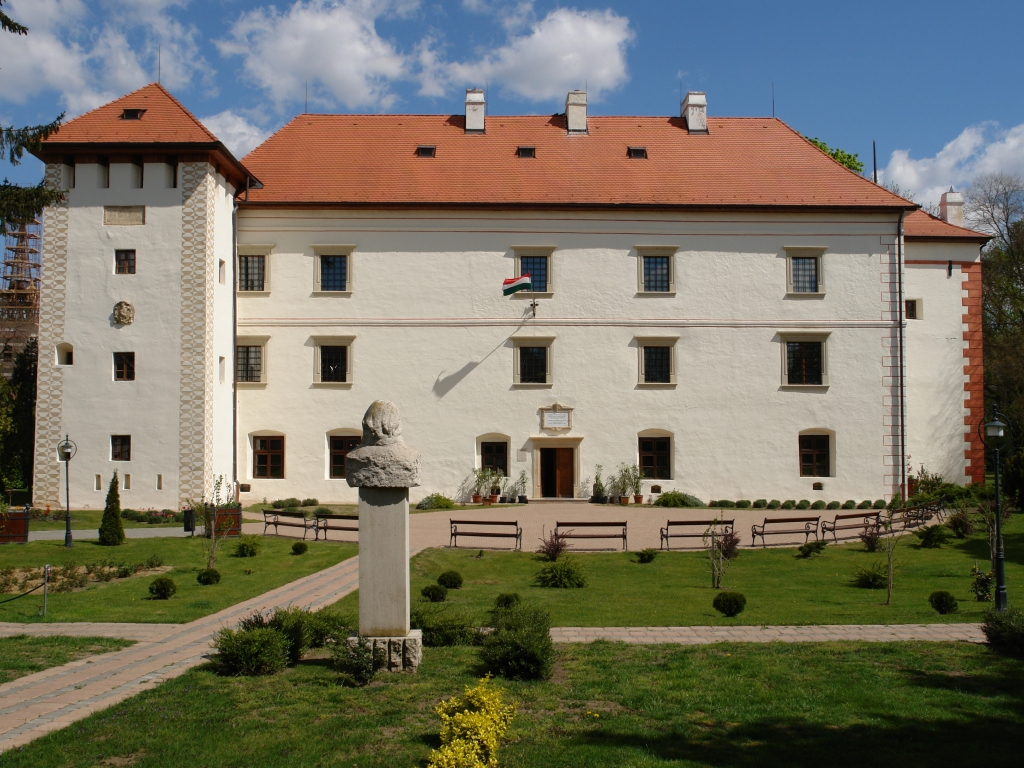
Vay Castle in Vaja

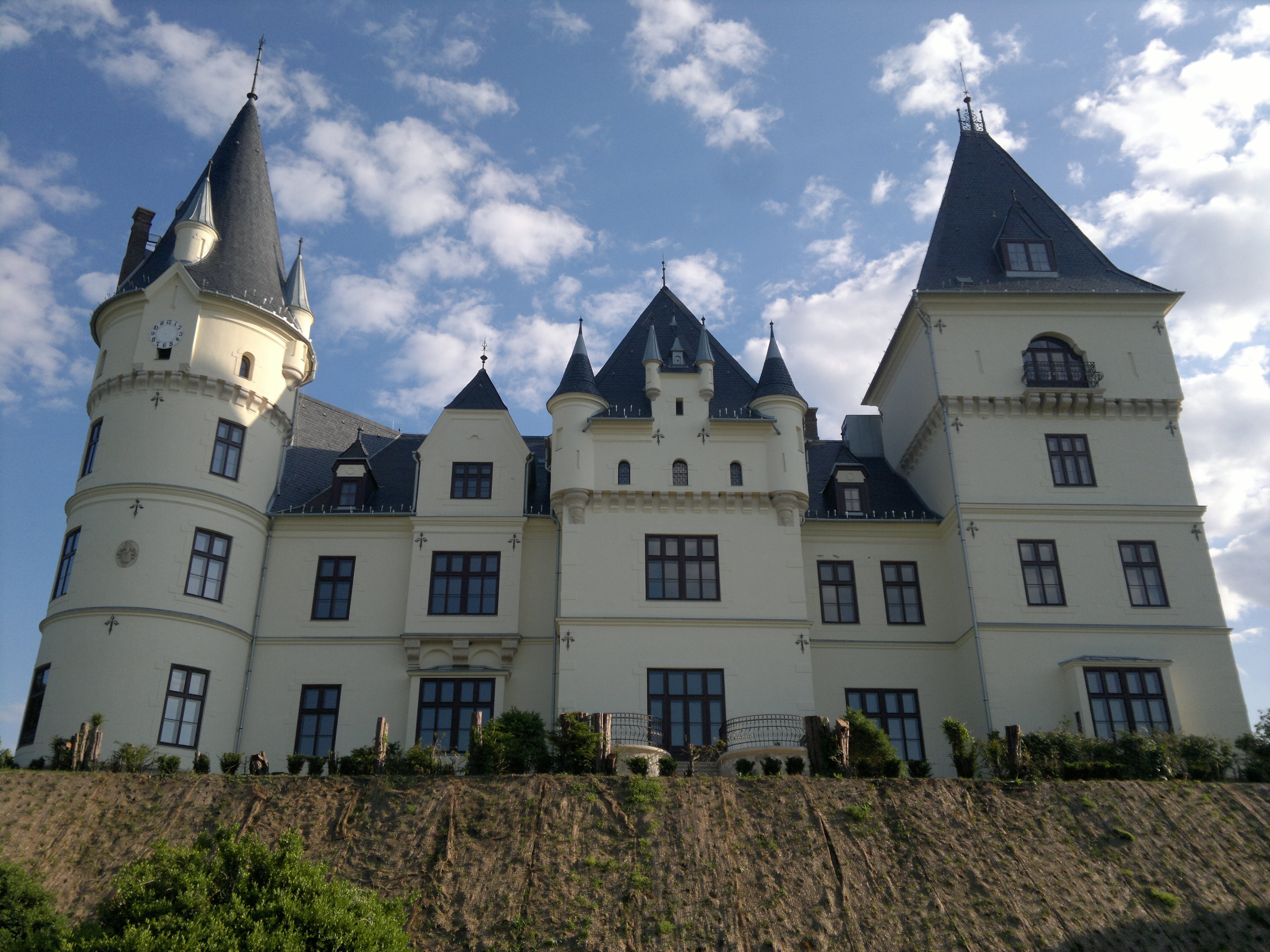
Andrássy Mansion, Tiszadob

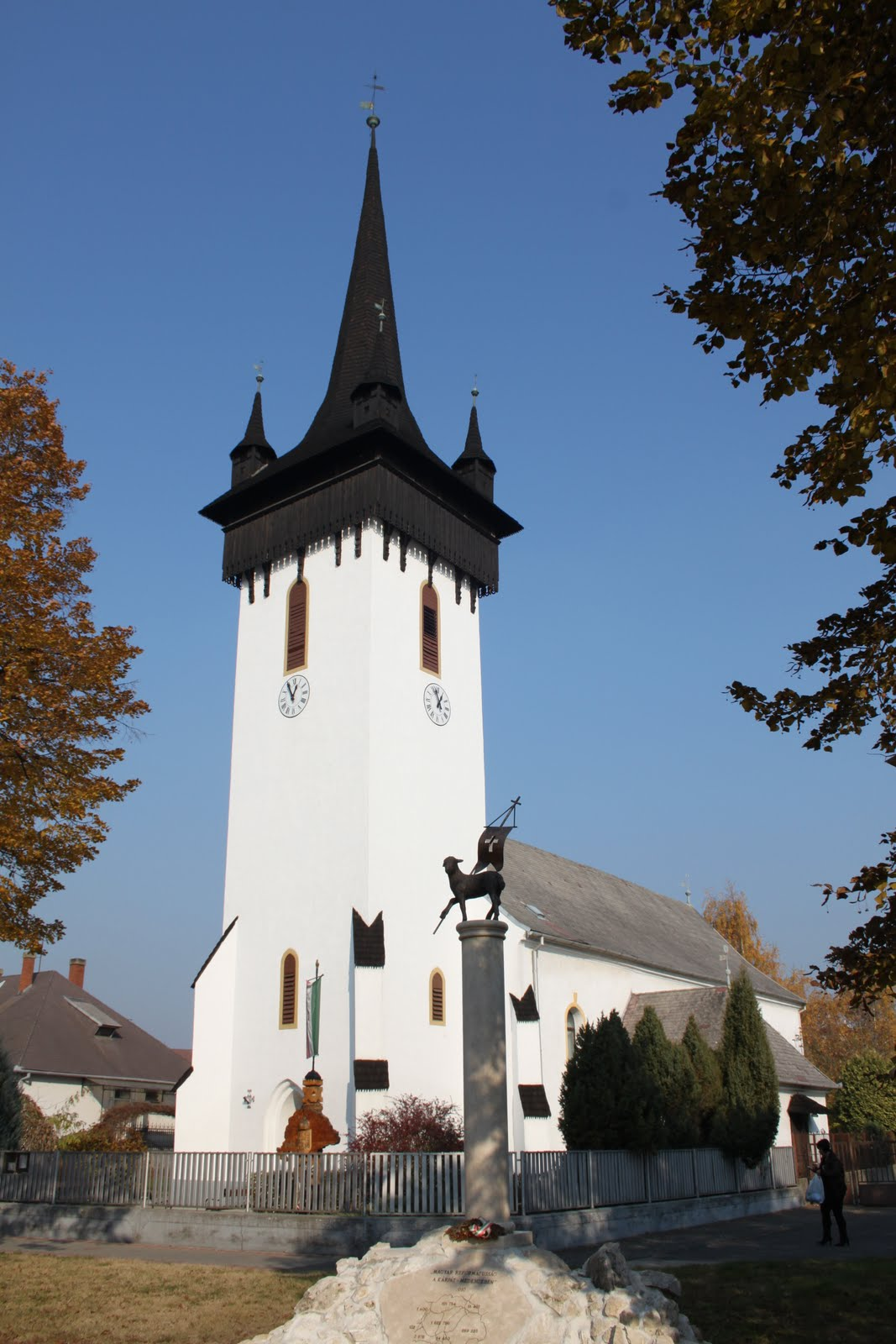
Reformed Church in Fehérgyarmat

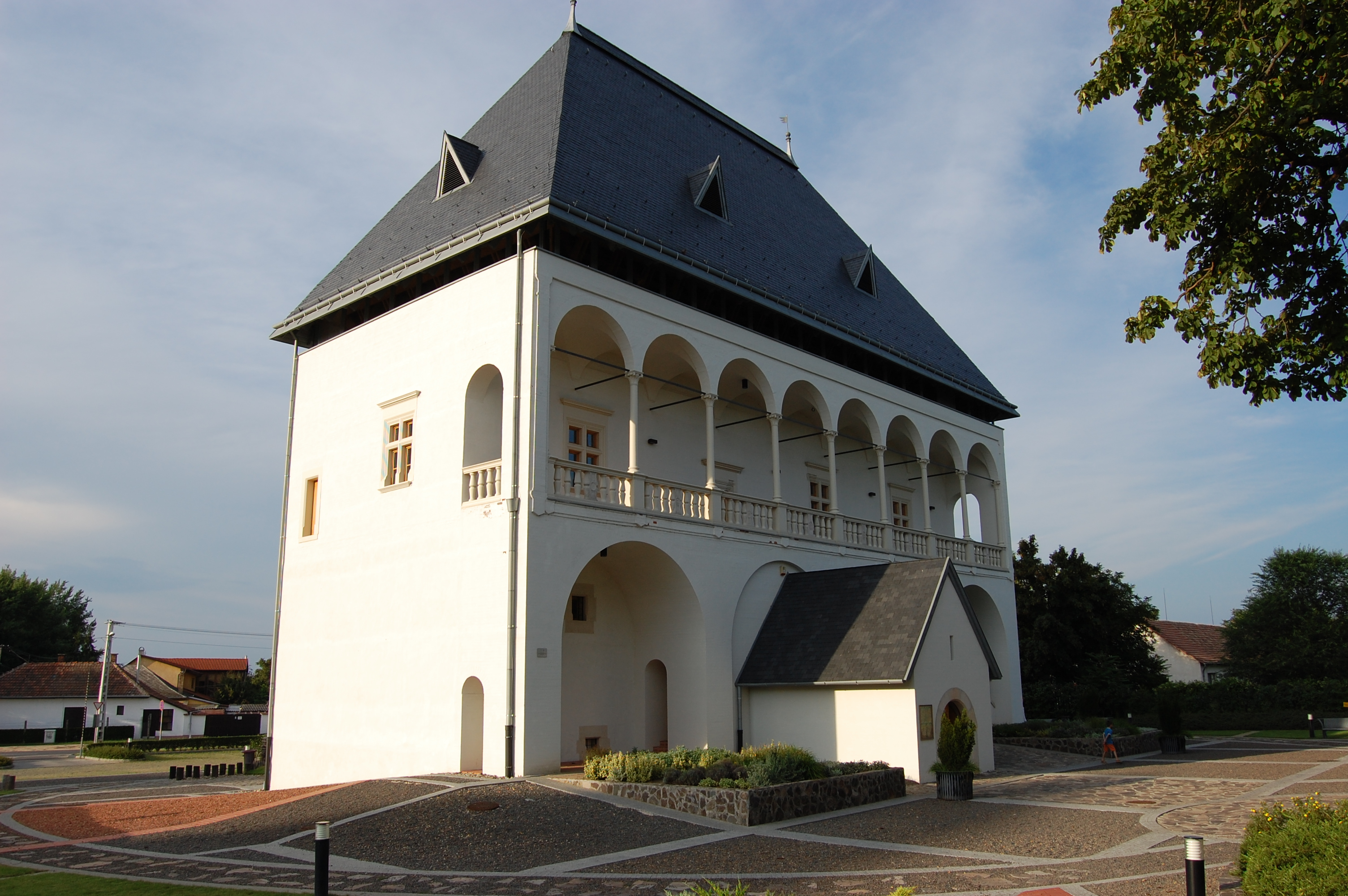
Báthory Castle in Nyírbátor

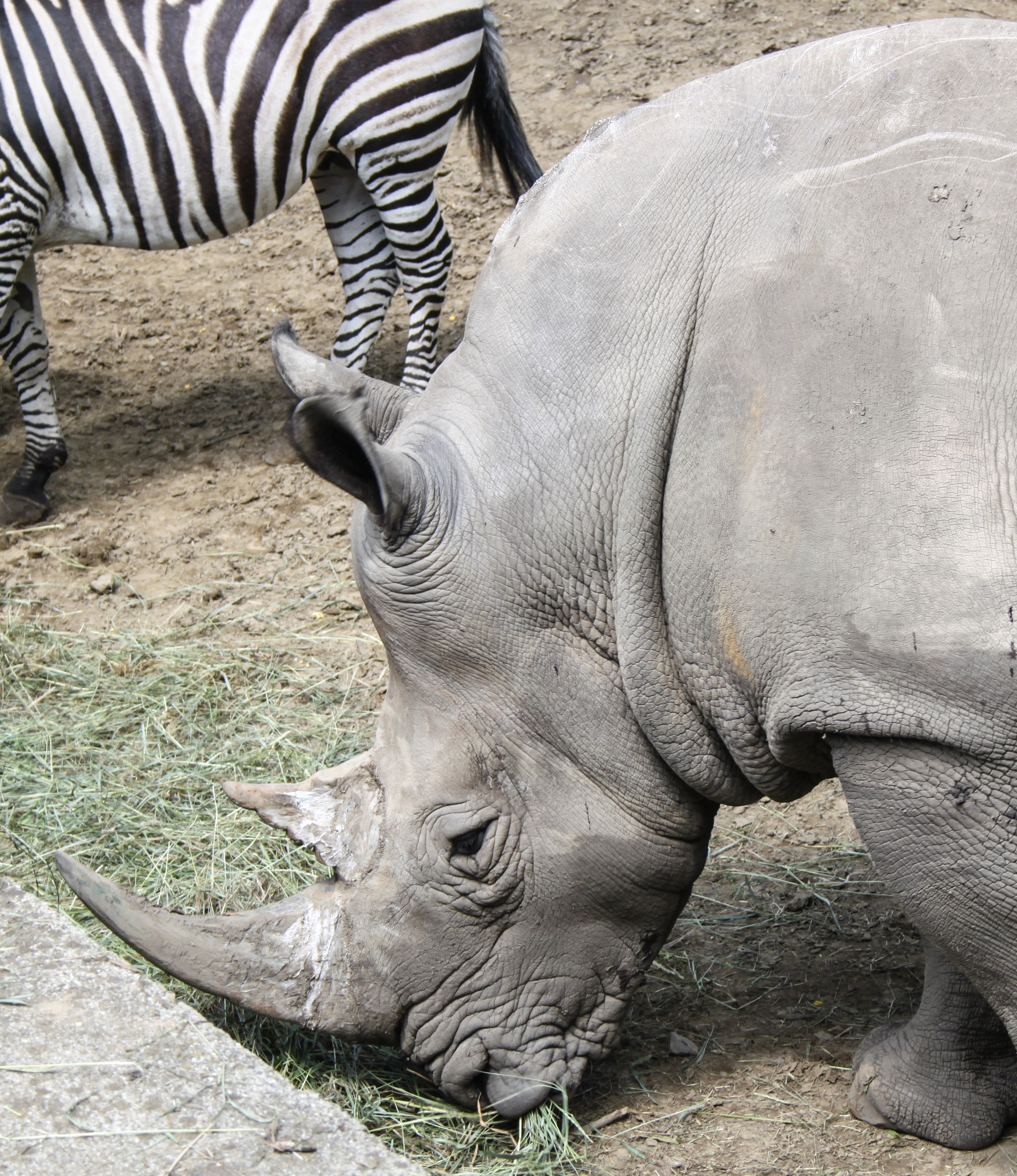
Nyíregyháza Zoo

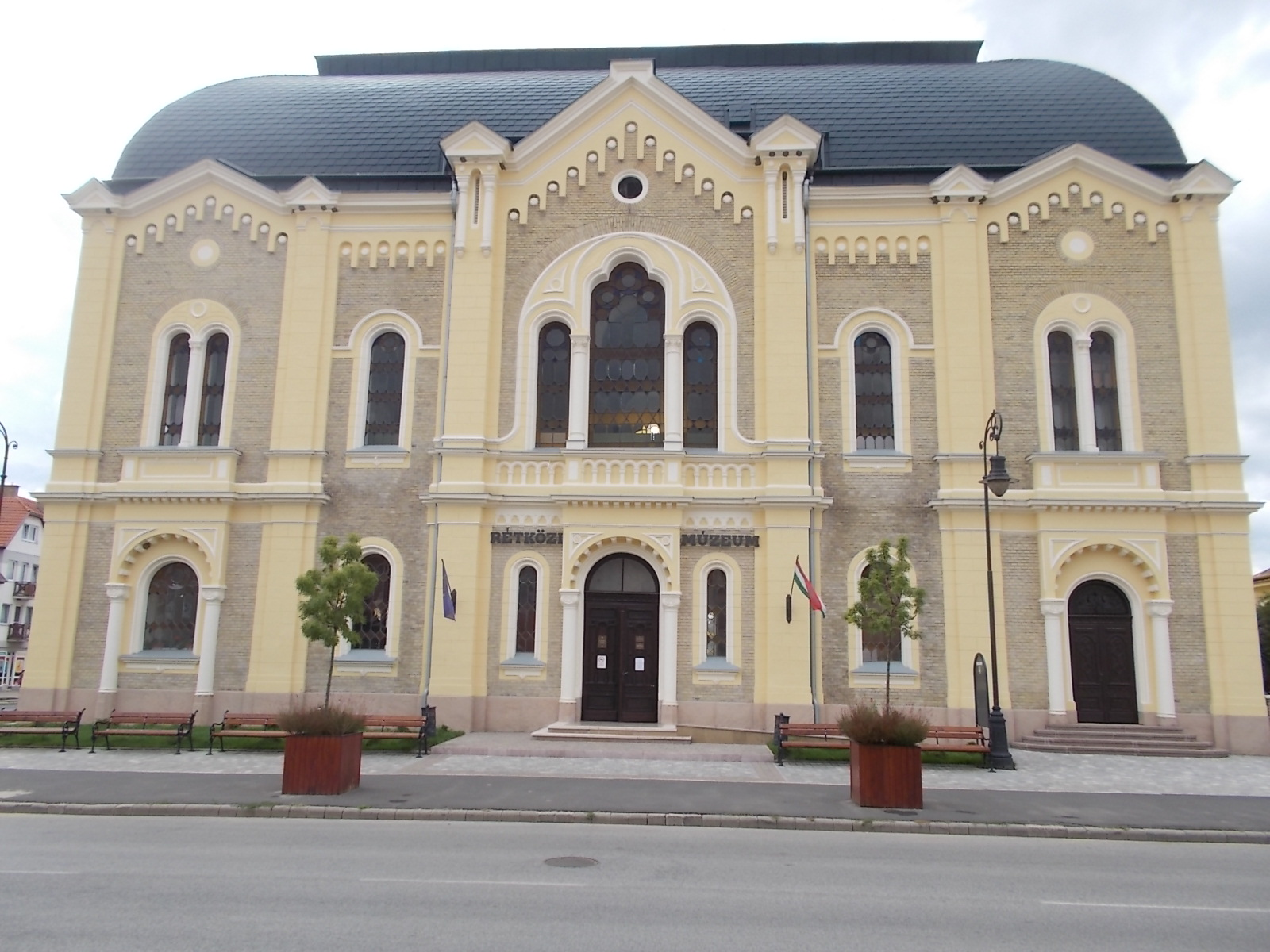
Rétköz Museum (former Orthodox Synagogue) in Kisvárda

== Notable people from Szabolcs-Szatmár-Bereg ==
- Agnes Gallus – Ópályi
- Krúdy Gyula – Nyíregyháza
- Kállay Miklós – Nyíregyháza
- Váci Mihály – Mandabokor II-
- Friderikusz Sándor – Nyíregyháza
- Victor Varconi né Várkonyi Mihály – Kisvárda

== International relations ==
Szabolcs–Szatmár–Bereg County has a partnership relationship with:

- Heilongjiang, China
- Khust Raion, Zakarpattia, Ukraine
- Satu Mare County, Romania
- Vynohradiv Raion, Zakarpattia, Ukraine
