= Nyírbogdány =

Coordinates: 48°03′N 21°53′E

- Interactive map of Nyírbogdány
- Country: Hungary
- County: Szabolcs-Szatmár-Bereg

Area
  - Total: 35.03 km^{2} (13.53 sq mi)

Population (2011)
  - Total: 2,965
  - Density: 84.6/km^{2} (219/sq mi)
- Time zone: UTC+1 (CET)
  - Summer (DST): UTC+2 (CEST)
- Postal code: 4511
- Area code: 42

Location of Szabolcs-Szatmar-Bereg county in Hungary

Nyírbogdány is a village in Szabolcs-Szatmár-Bereg county, in the Northern Great Plain region of eastern Hungary.

== Geography ==
It covers an area of 35.03 km^{2} (14 sq mi) and has a population of 3965 people (2011).
