= Komlódtótfalu =

Coordinates: 47°51′N 22°42′E

- Interactive map of Komlódtótfalu
- Country: Hungary
- County: Szabolcs-Szatmár-Bereg

Area
  - Total: 6.97 km^{2} (2.69 sq mi)

Population (2015)
  - Total: 121
  - Density: 17.4/km^{2} (45/sq mi)
- Time zone: UTC+1 (CET)
  - Summer (DST): UTC+2 (CEST)
- Postal code: 4765
- Area code: 44

Location of Szabolcs-Szatmar-Bereg county in Hungary

Komlódtótfalu is a village in Szabolcs-Szatmár-Bereg county, in the Northern Great Plain region of eastern Hungary.

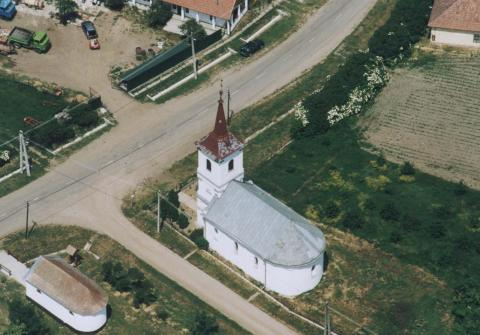
Aerial photography of Komlódtótfalu

== Geography ==
It covers an area of 6.97 km^{2} (3 sq mi) and has a population of 121 people (2015).
