= Nyírlövő =

Coordinates: 48°12′N 22°11′E

- Interactive map of Nyírlövő
- Country: Hungary
- County: Szabolcs-Szatmár-Bereg

Area
  - Total: 7.91 km^{2} (3.05 sq mi)

Population (2015)
  - Total: 674
  - Density: 85.2/km^{2} (221/sq mi)
- Time zone: UTC+1 (CET)
  - Summer (DST): UTC+2 (CEST)
- Postal code: 4632
- Area code: 45

Location of Szabolcs-Szatmar-Bereg county in Hungary

Nyírlövő is a village in Szabolcs-Szatmár-Bereg county, in the Northern Great Plain region of eastern Hungary.

== Geography ==
It covers an area of 7.91 km^{2} (3 sq mi) and has a population of 674 people (2015).
