= Nyírcsaholy =

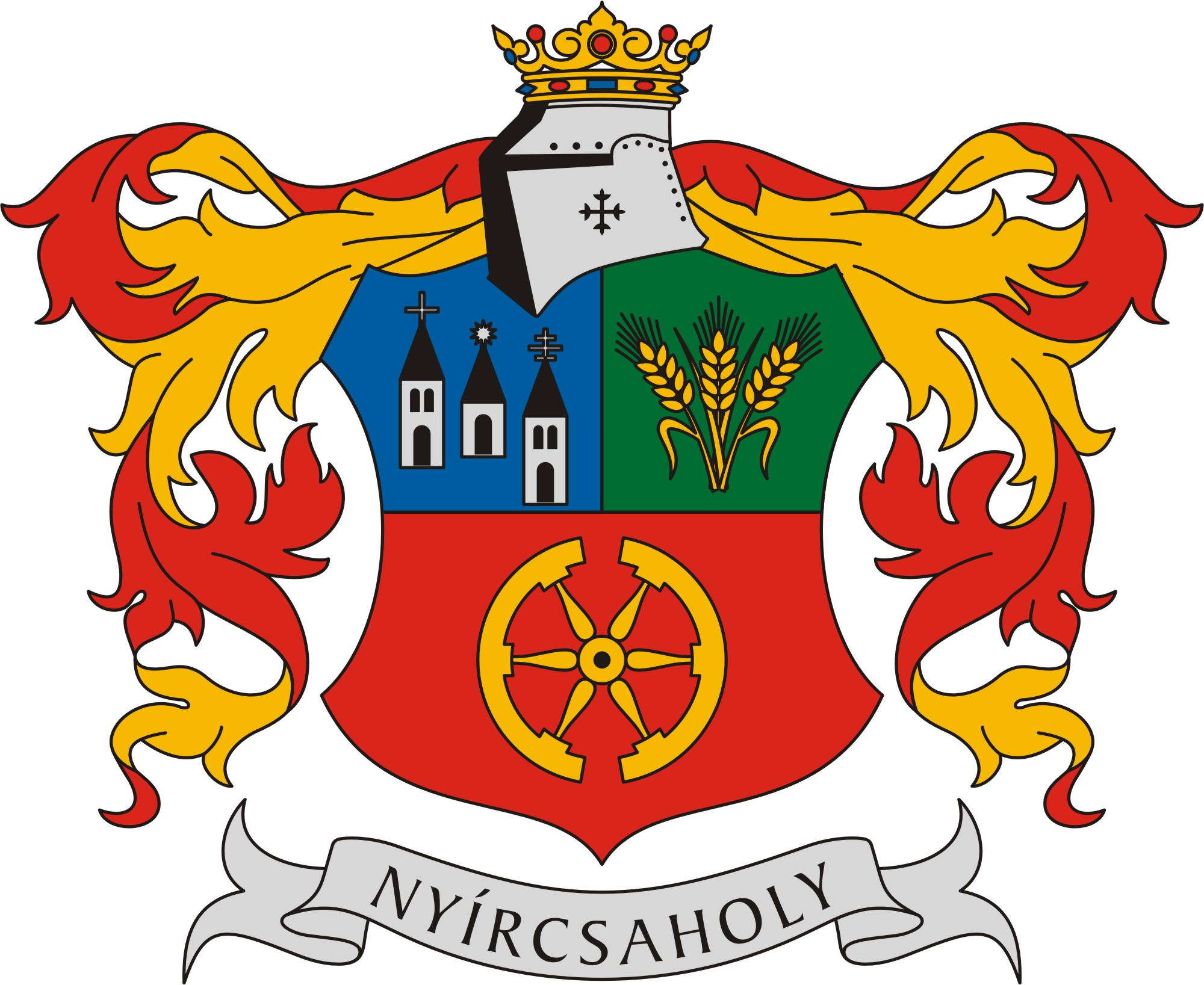
- Coat of arms

- Location of Nyírcsaholy in Hungary
- Coordinates: 47°54′12″N 22°20′09″E
- Country: Hungary
- Region: Northern Great Plain
- County: Szabolcs-Szatmár-Bereg

Area
  - Total: 34.3 km^{2} (13.2 sq mi)

Population (2011)
  - Total: 2,119
  - Density: 61.8/km^{2} (160/sq mi)
- Time zone: UTC+1 (CET)
  - Summer (DST): UTC+2 (CEST)
- Postal code: 4356
- Area code: +36 74
- Website: www.nyircsaholy.hu

Nyírcsaholy is a village in Szabolcs-Szatmár-Bereg County, Hungary.
