= Baktalórántháza =

- Town
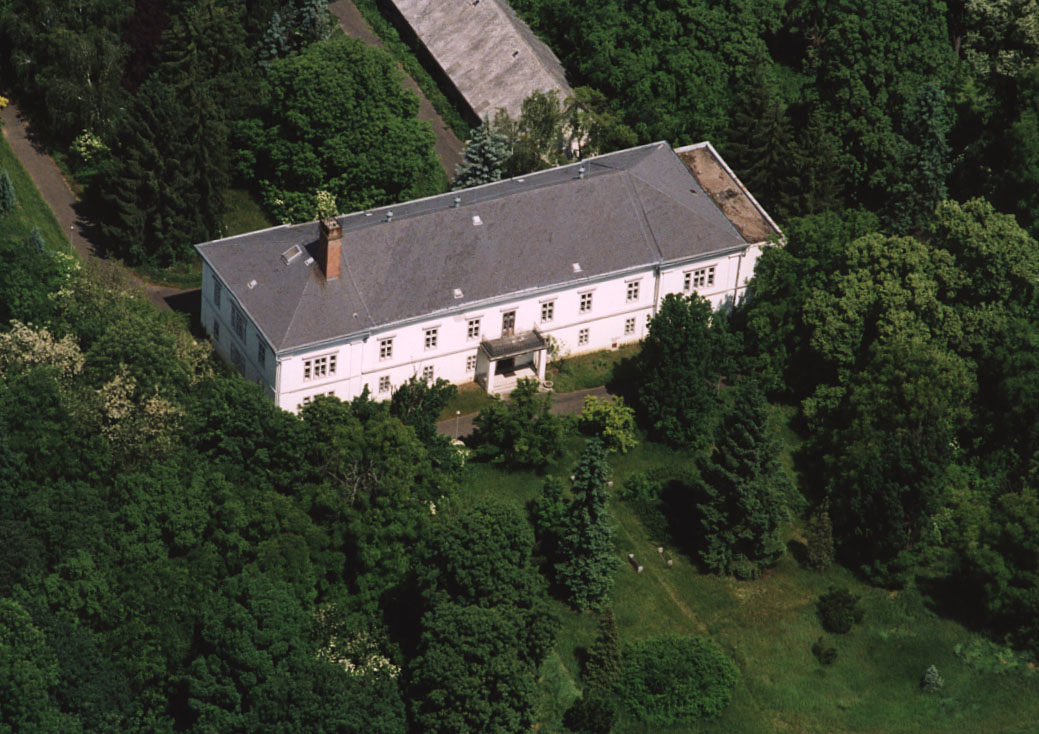
- Aerial photograph: Dégenfeld Mansion

- Flag Coat of arms

- Location within Szabolcs-Szatmár-Bereg County Location within Hungary
- Coordinates: 48°00′00″N 22°00′05″E
- Country: Hungary
- County: Szabolcs-Szatmár-Bereg
- District: Baktalórántháza

Area
  - Total: 35.25 km^{2} (13.61 sq mi)

Population (2015)
  - Total: 3,987
  - Density: 113.1/km^{2} (292.9/sq mi)
- Time zone: UTC+1 (CET)
  - Summer (DST): UTC+2 (CEST)
- Postal code: 4561
- Area code: (+36) 42
- Website: baktaloranthaza.hu

Baktalórántháza is a town in Szabolcs-Szatmár-Bereg county, in the Northern Great Plain region of eastern Hungary.

== Geography ==
It covers an area of 35.25 km^{2} (14 sq mi) and has a population of 3,987 people (2015).

== History ==
Baktalórántháza has been settled since the late Copper Age. The first written documents mentioning the town, called Bakta at the time, date back to 1271.

The building of Castle of Bakta was ordered between 1618 and 1638 by Graf Laszlo Barkoczy. In the 1710s, Francis II Rákóczi was a frequent guest at the castle.

=== Jewish community ===
In the 19th and 20th centuries, a small Jewish community lived in the village, in 1930 211 Jews lived in the village, most of whom were murdered in the Holocaust. The community had a Jewish cemetery.

== Religion ==
The Roman Catholic Church has been prominent in the city's life ever since the Middle Ages. The local Catholic church has been completed in 1282.

The city also has a Greek Catholic church which was built in 1842, in the late Baroque style.

The Presbyterian church was built in the early 17th century, and a church bell was added between 1842 and 1844.

== Education ==
Baktalórántháza is located geographically in the centre of the county. Having a high school of 1,500 students makes the town an important educational centre.

== Twin towns – sister cities ==
Baktalórántháza is twinned with:

- Łańcut, Poland
