= Besenyőd =

Place in Hungary

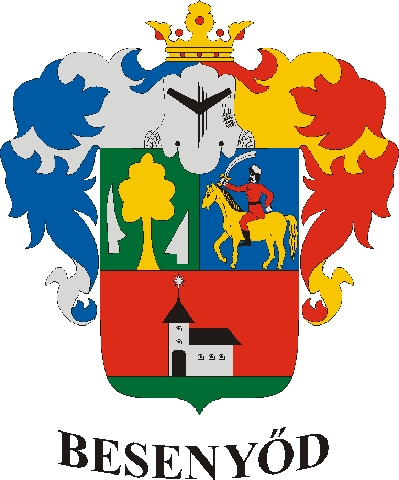
- Coat of arms

- Location of Besenyőd in Hungary
- Coordinates: 47.97°N 22.02°E
- Country: Hungary
- Region: Northern Great Plain
- County: Szabolcs-Szatmár-Bereg

Area
  - Total: 9.45 km^{2} (3.65 sq mi)

Population (1 January 2017)
  - Total: 744
  - Density: 78.7/km^{2} (204/sq mi)
- Time zone: UTC+1 (CET)
  - Summer (DST): UTC+2 (CEST)
- Postal code: 4557
- Area code: +36 42
- Website: http://www.besenyod.hu/

Besenyőd is a village in Szabolcs-Szatmár-Bereg county, in the Northern Great Plain region of eastern Hungary.

== Geography ==
It covers an area of 9.45 km^{2} (4 sq mi) and has a population of 681 people (2013 estimate).

== Population ==
Year	1980	1990	2001	2010	2011	2013
Population	688 (census)	572 (census)	699 (census)	650 (estimate)	669 (census)	681 (estimate)
