= Nyírkarász =

- Location of Nyírkarász in Hungary
- Coordinates: 48°05′47″N 22°06′02″E
- Country: Hungary
- Region: Northern Great Plain
- County: Szabolcs-Szatmár-Bereg

Area
  - Total: 41.4 km^{2} (16.0 sq mi)

Population (2011)
  - Total: 2,297
  - Density: 55.5/km^{2} (144/sq mi)
- Time zone: UTC+1 (CET)
  - Summer (DST): UTC+2 (CEST)
- Postal code: 4544
- Area code: +36 74
- Website: www.nyirkarasz.hu

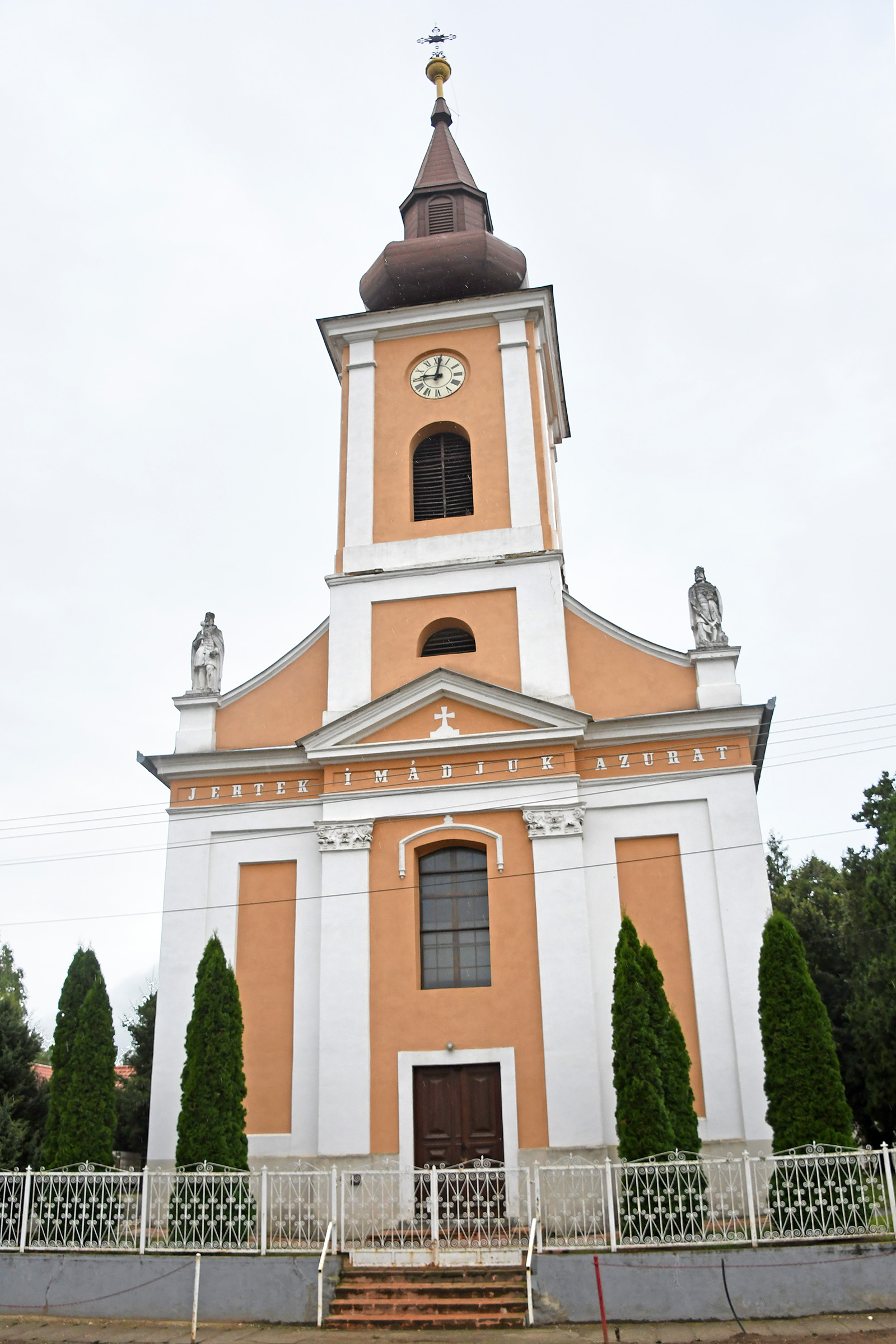
Roman Catholic church in Nyírkarász, Hungary.

Nyírkarász is a village in Szabolcs-Szatmár-Bereg County, Hungary.

== Notable people ==
- Zechariah Elefant (1886-1957) - rabbi and author
