= Nyírmeggyes =

- Location of Nyírmeggyes in Hungary
- Coordinates: 47.9133°N 22.2639°E
- Country: Hungary
- Region: Northern Great Plain
- County: Szabolcs-Szatmár-Bereg

Area
  - Total: 28.79 km^{2} (11.12 sq mi)

Population (2017)
  - Total: 2,712
  - Density: 94.20/km^{2} (244.0/sq mi)
- Time zone: UTC+1 (CET)
  - Summer (DST): UTC+2 (CEST)
- Postal code: 4722
- Area code: +36 44
- Website: https://nyirmeggyes.hu/

Nyírmeggyes is a village in Szabolcs-Szatmár-Bereg county, in the Northern Great Plain region of eastern Hungary.

== Geography ==
It covers an area of 28.79 km^{2} (11 sq mi) and has a population of 2712 people (2017).
