= Petneháza =

Coordinates: 48°04′N 22°05′E

- Interactive map of Petneháza
- Country: Hungary
- County: Szabolcs-Szatmár-Bereg

Area
  - Total: 24.2 km^{2} (9.3 sq mi)

Population (2015)
  - Total: 1,732
  - Density: 71.6/km^{2} (185/sq mi)
- Time zone: UTC+1 (CET)
  - Summer (DST): UTC+2 (CEST)
- Postal code: 4542
- Area code: 45

Location of Szabolcs-Szatmar-Bereg county in Hungary

Petneháza is a village in Szabolcs-Szatmár-Bereg county, in the Northern Great Plain region of eastern Hungary.

== History ==
=== The jewish community ===
The census of 1770 mentions Jews who lived in Petneháza. Most of them worked as merchants. The Jewish community was organized at the beginning of the 19th century. During the Schism in Hungarian Jewry, following the Hungarian Jewish Congress in 1869, 1868 the community joined the Orthodox stream. There were synagogue, two cemeteries and mikveh.

In 1941 young Jews from Petneháza were taken to forced labor, and only one of them survived.

In March 1944, about a month after the German army entered Hungary, the Jews of Petneháza were taken to Nyíregyháza, and from there were sent a few weeks later to the Auschwitz extermination camp.

== Geography ==
It covers an area of 24.2 km^{2} (9 sq mi) and has a population of 1732 people (2015).
