= Kállay family =

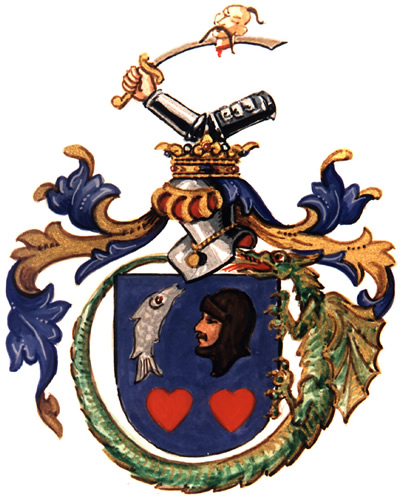
Coat of arms of Kállay family

Kállay family is a Hungarian noble family. The family name derived from their estates at Nagy-Kalló, in Szabolcs, and they claimed descent from the Hungarian Balogh-Semjén genus (clan), which colonized the counties of Borsod, Szabolcs, and Szatmár, at the close of the 9th century. János Kállay de Nagy-Kálló was given the title Count by Hungarian Queen Maria Theresa in 1778, but the comital line became extinct.

- Béni Kállay de Nagykálló (German: Benjamin von Kállay; 1839 – 1903), Austro-Hungarian statesman
- Tibor Kállay de Nagykálló (1881–1964), Hungarian politician
- Miklós Kállay de Nagykálló (1887, Nyíregyháza – 1967, New York City), Hungarian politician, Prime Minister of Hungary during World War II
- András Kállay-Saunders (born 1985), Hungarian-American singer, songwriter, and record producer

== See also ==
- List of titled noble families in the Kingdom of Hungary
