= Rohod =

Coordinates: 48°02′N 22°08′E

- Interactive map of Rohod
- Country: Hungary
- County: Szabolcs-Szatmár-Bereg

Area
  - Total: 19.56 km^{2} (7.55 sq mi)

Population (2015)
  - Total: 1,235
  - Density: 63.1/km^{2} (163/sq mi)
- Time zone: UTC+1 (CET)
  - Summer (DST): UTC+2 (CEST)
- Postal code: 4563
- Area code: 44

Location of Szabolcs-Szatmar-Bereg county in Hungary

Rohod is a village in Szabolcs-Szatmár-Bereg county, in the Northern Great Plain region of eastern Hungary.

Jews lived in Rohod for many years until they were murdered in the Holocaust.

== Geography ==
It covers an area of 19.56 km^{2} (8 sq mi) and has a population of 1235 people (2015).
