= Laskod =

- Location within Hungary
- Coordinates: 48°03′N 22°03′E
- Country: Hungary
- County: Szabolcs-Szatmár-Bereg

Area
  - Total: 13.59 km^{2} (5.25 sq mi)

Population (2011)
  - Total: 1,045
  - Density: 76.9/km^{2} (199/sq mi)
- Time zone: UTC+1 (CET)
  - Summer (DST): UTC+2 (CEST)
- Postal code: 4543
- Area code: 45

Laskod is a village in Szabolcs-Szatmár-Bereg county, in the Northern Great Plain region of eastern Hungary.

It covers an area of 13.59 km^{2} (5 sq mi) and has a population of 1047 people (2011).
