= Nyírparasznya =

- Location of Nyírparasznya in Hungary
- Coordinates: 48°01′29″N 22°15′49″E
- Country: Hungary
- Region: Northern Great Plain
- County: Szabolcs-Szatmár-Bereg

Area
  - Total: 14.8 km^{2} (5.7 sq mi)

Population (2011)
  - Total: 959
  - Density: 64.8/km^{2} (168/sq mi)
- Time zone: UTC+1 (CET)
  - Summer (DST): UTC+2 (CEST)
- Postal code: 4822
- Area code: +36 44
- Website: www.nyirparasznya.hu

Nyírparasznya is a village in Szabolcs-Szatmár-Bereg County, Hungary.
