= Nyíribrony =

Coordinates: 48°01′N 21°58′E

- Interactive map of Nyíribrony
- Country: Hungary
- County: Szabolcs-Szatmár-Bereg

Area
  - Total: 20.09 km^{2} (7.76 sq mi)

Population (2015)
  - Total: 1,104
  - Density: 55/km^{2} (140/sq mi)
- Time zone: UTC+1 (CET)
  - Summer (DST): UTC+2 (CEST)
- Postal code: 4535
- Area code: 42

Location of Szabolcs-Szatmar-Bereg county in Hungary

Nyíribrony is a village in Szabolcs-Szatmár-Bereg county, in the Northern Great Plain region of eastern Hungary.

== Geography ==
It covers an area of 20.09 km^{2} (8 sq mi) and has a population of 1105 people (2015).
