= Magy =

Coordinates: 47°56′N 21°59′E

- Interactive map of Magy
- Country: Hungary
- County: Szabolcs-Szatmár-Bereg

Area
  - Total: 20.70 km^{2} (7.99 sq mi)

Population (2001)
  - Total: 996
  - Density: 48.1/km^{2} (125/sq mi)
- Time zone: UTC+1 (CET)
  - Summer (DST): UTC+2 (CEST)
- Postal code: 4556
- Area code: 42

Location of Szabolcs-Szatmar-Bereg county in Hungary

Magy is a village in Szabolcs-Szatmár-Bereg county, in the Northern Great Plain region of eastern Hungary.

== Geography ==
It covers an area of 20.70 km^{2} (8 sq mi) and has a population of 996 people (2001).
