= Nyírkércs =

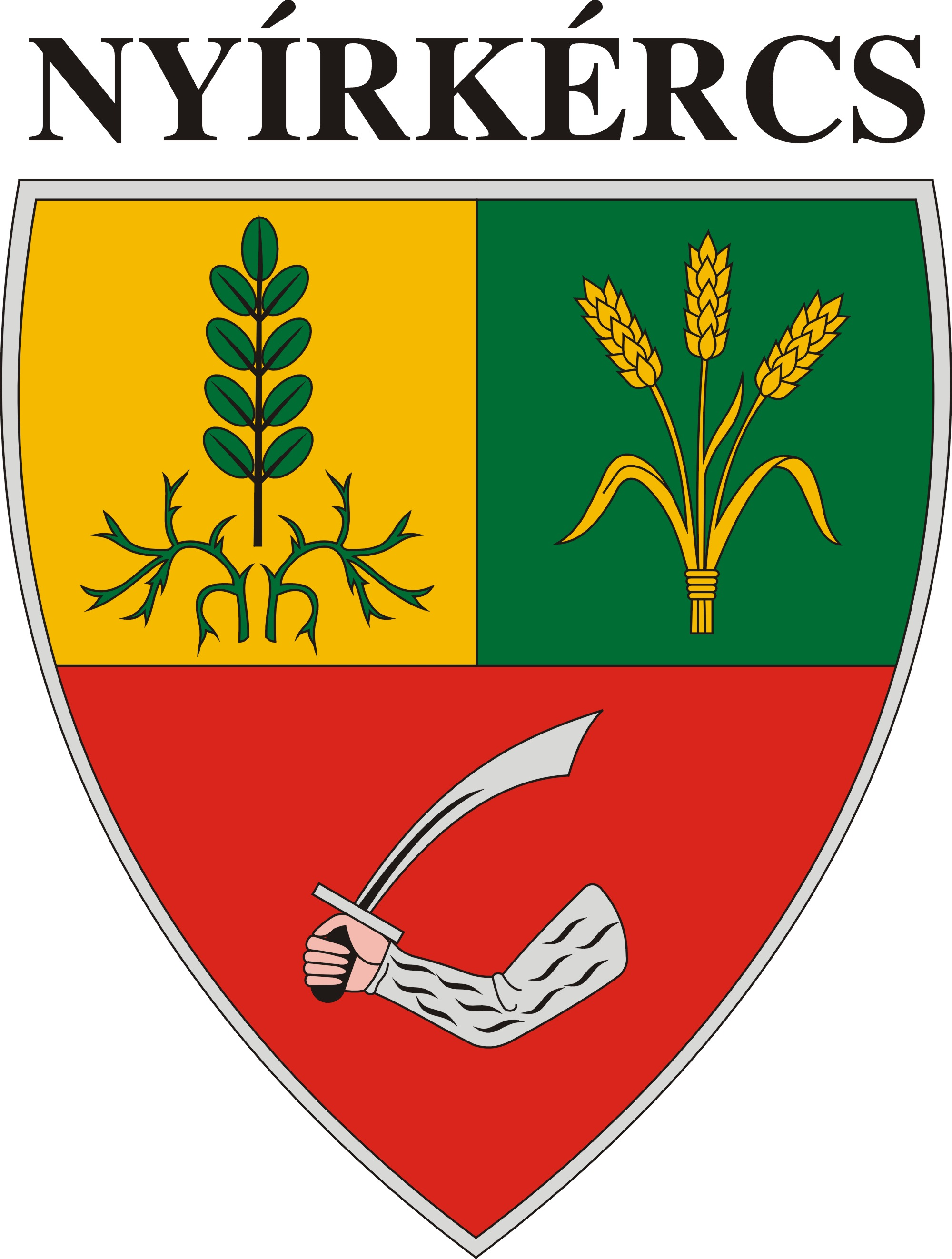
- Coat of arms of Nyirkércs

- Location of Nyírkércs in Hungary
- Coordinates: 48°00′45″N 22°02′55″E
- Country: Hungary
- Region: Northern Great Plain
- County: Szabolcs-Szatmár-Bereg

Area
  - Total: 14.3 km^{2} (5.5 sq mi)

Population (2011)
  - Total: 807
  - Density: 56.4/km^{2} (146/sq mi)
- Time zone: UTC+1 (CET)
  - Summer (DST): UTC+2 (CEST)
- Postal code: 4537
- Area code: +36 74
- Website: www.nyirkercs.hu

Nyírkércs is a village in Szabolcs-Szatmár-Bereg County, Hungary.
