= Levelek =

- Large Village
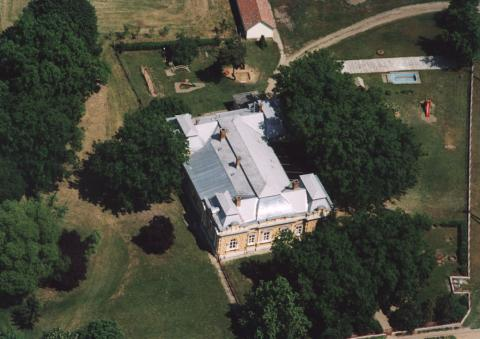
- The Molnár family palace

- Flag Coat of arms

- Location in Hungary
- Coordinates: 47°58′N 22°00′E
- Country: Hungary
- County: Szabolcs-Szatmár-Bereg

Area
  - Total: 25.73 km^{2} (9.93 sq mi)

Population (2022)
  - Total: 2,679
  - Density: 104/km^{2} (270/sq mi)
- Time zone: UTC+1 (CET)
  - Summer (DST): UTC+2 (CEST)
- Postal code: 4555
- Area code: 44
- Website: https://levelektelepules.hu/

Levelek is a large village in Szabolcs-Szatmár-Bereg county, in the Northern Great Plain region of eastern Hungary.

== Geography ==
It covers an area of 25.73 km^{2} (10 sq mi) and has a population of 2950 people (2015).

== History ==
The village is very old, perhaps having been formed around the time of the Hungarian Conquest of the Carpathian Basin.

== Demographics ==
As of 2023, the village had a total population of 2752. As of 2022, the town was 91.7% Hungarian, 3.1% Gypsy, and 1.5% of non-European origin. The remainder chose not to respond. The population was 28.2% Roman Catholic, 26.4% Greek Catholic, and 15.2% Reformed.
