= Nyírjákó =

Coordinates: 48°02′N 22°05′E

- Interactive map of Nyírjákó
- Country: Hungary
- County: Szabolcs-Szatmár-Bereg

Area
  - Total: 10.34 km^{2} (3.99 sq mi)

Population (2015)
  - Total: 873
  - Density: 84.4/km^{2} (219/sq mi)
- Time zone: UTC+1 (CET)
  - Summer (DST): UTC+2 (CEST)
- Postal code: 4541
- Area code: 42

Location of Szabolcs-Szatmar-Bereg county in Hungary

Nyírjákó is a village in Szabolcs-Szatmár-Bereg county, in the Northern Great Plain region of eastern Hungary.

== Geography ==
It covers an area of 10.34 km^{2} (4 sq mi) and has a population of 873 people (2015).
