= Szabolcs-Szatmár-Bereg County 4th constituency =

Constituency in Hungary (2014–)

- Constituency for the National Assembly
- Location of Szabolcs-Szatmár-Bereg county 04 within Szabolcs-Szatmár-Bereg county

- Location of Szabolcs-Szatmár-Bereg county within Hungary
- County: Szabolcs-Szatmár-Bereg County
- Population: 84,020 (2022)
- Major settlements: Vásárosnamény

Current constituency
- Created: 2011
- Party: Fidesz–KDNP
- Member: Attila Tilki
- Elected: 2014, 2018, 2022, 2026

The Szabolcs-Szatmár-Bereg County 4th parliamentary constituency is one of the 106 constituencies into which the territory of Hungary is divided by Act CCIII of 2011, and in which voters can elect one member of the National Assembly. The standard abbreviation of the constituency name is: Szabolcs-Szatmár-Bereg 04. OEVK. The seat is:Vásárosnamény.

The constituency includes 88 settlements, of which 4 are urban and 84 are village or large village status. The majority of the constituency consists of small settlements.

In 2022, the constituency had a population of 84,020, and the district is characterized by a decreasing population. The number of residents eligible to vote was 70,191 in December 2025. Based on its population structure, it is of an outer peripheral nature. Based on the 2022 income data, the majority of the constituency can be classified as low and lower-middle income. A district defined by those with low and medium education according to the highest completed educational level.

Since 2014, the constituency has had a single representative, Dr. Attila Tilki, a Fidesz-KDNP MP who has held his seat for four elections.

In terms of competitiveness, it can be called a safe seat for the ruling party (Fidesz-KDNP).

The representative of the constituency is Attila Tilki (Fidesz-KDNP).

== Area ==
The constituency includes 88 settlements, of which 4 are urban, 4 are large-scale and 80 are village-level. The majority of the constituency consists of small settlements.

Város

1. Fehérgyarmat
2. Mándok
3. Vásárosnamény
4. Záhony

Nagyközség

1. Kölcse
2. Tarpa
3. Tiszabecs
4. Tuzsér

Község

1. Aranyosapáti
2. Barabás
3. Benk
4. Beregdaróc
5. Beregsurány
6. Botpalád
7. Cégénydányád
8. Csaholc
9. Csaroda
10. Császló
11. Csegöld
12. Darnó
13. Eperjeske
14. Fülesd
15. Gacsály
16. Garbolc
17. Gelénes
18. Gulács
19. Győröcske
20. Gyügye
21. Gyüre
22. Hermánszeg
23. Hetefejércse
24. Ilk
25. Jánd
26. Jánkmajtis
27. Kérsemjén
28. Kisar
29. Kishódos
30. Kisnamény
31. Kispalád
32. Kisvarsány
33. Kisszekeres
34. Kömörő
35. Lónya
36. Magosliget
37. Mánd
38. Márokpapi
39. Mátyus
40. Méhtelek
41. Milota
42. Nábrád
43. Nagyar
44. Nagydobos
45. Nagyhódos
46. Nagyszekeres
47. Nagyvarsány
48. Nemesborzova
49. Olcsva
50. Olcsvaapáti
51. Panyola
52. Penyige
53. Rozsály
54. Sonkád
55. Szamoskér
56. Szamossályi
57. Szamosújlak
58. Szamosszeg
59. Szatmárcseke
60. Tákos
61. Tiszaadony
62. Tiszabezdéd
63. Tiszacsécse
64. Tiszakerecseny
65. Tiszakóród
66. Tiszamogyorós
67. Tiszaszalka
68. Tiszaszentmárton
69. Tiszavid
70. Tisztaberek
71. Tivadar
72. Tunyogmatolcs
73. Túristvándi
74. Túrricse
75. Uszka
76. Vámosatya
77. Vámosoroszi
78. Zajta
79. Zsarolyán
80. Zsurk

== Members of parliament ==
Name	Party	Term	Election
Attila Tilki	Fidesz-KDNP	2014 –	Results of the 2014 parliamentary election:
Attila Tilki	Fidesz-KDNP	2014 –	Results of the 2018 parliamentary election:
Attila Tilki	Fidesz-KDNP	2014 –	Results of the 2022 parliamentary election:
Attila Tilki	Fidesz-KDNP	2014 –	Results of the 2026 parliamentary election: 50.56%

== Demographics ==
Historical population
Year	Pop.	±%
2011	87,823	—
2022	84,020	−4.3%

The demographics of the constituency are as follows. The population of constituency No. 4 of Szabolcs-Szatmár-Bereg County was 84,020 on October 1, 2022. The population of the constituency decreased by 3,803 people between the 2011 and 2022 censuses. Based on the age composition, the majority of people in the constituency are middle-aged people with 28,346 people, while the fewest are elderly people with 15,467 people. 79.1% of the population of the constituency has internet access.

According to the highest level of completed education, those with a high school diploma are the most numerous, with 22,205 people, followed by those with primary school education, with 19,416 people.

According to economic activity, almost half of the population is employed, 34,807 people, the second most significant group is inactive earners, who are mainly pensioners, with 21,761 people.

The most significant ethnic group in the constituency is the Roma (4,315 people) and the Ukrainians (750 people). The proportion of foreign citizens who do not have Hungarian citizenship is 0.5%.

According to religious composition, the largest religion of the residents of the constituency is the Reformed (34,789 people), and a significant community is the Roman Catholic (4,873 people). The number of those not belonging to a religious community is also significant (2,579 people), the fourth largest group in the constituency after the Reformed, Roman Catholic and Greek Catholic religions.

== Sources ==
- ↑ Vjt.: "2011. évi CCIII. törvény az országgyűlési képviselők választásáról". Nemzeti Jogszabálytár. Magyar Közlöny Lap- és Könyvkiadó Kft.
- ↑ KSH: "Az országgyűlési egyéni választókerületek adatai". Népszámlálás 2011. Központi Statisztikai Hivatal.
- ↑ NVI: "Egyéni jelöltek".
