= Fehérgyarmat District =

Coordinates: 48.0000°N 22.6667°E

Fehérgyarmat District Fehérgyarmati járás
- Districts of Hungary
- Coat of arms

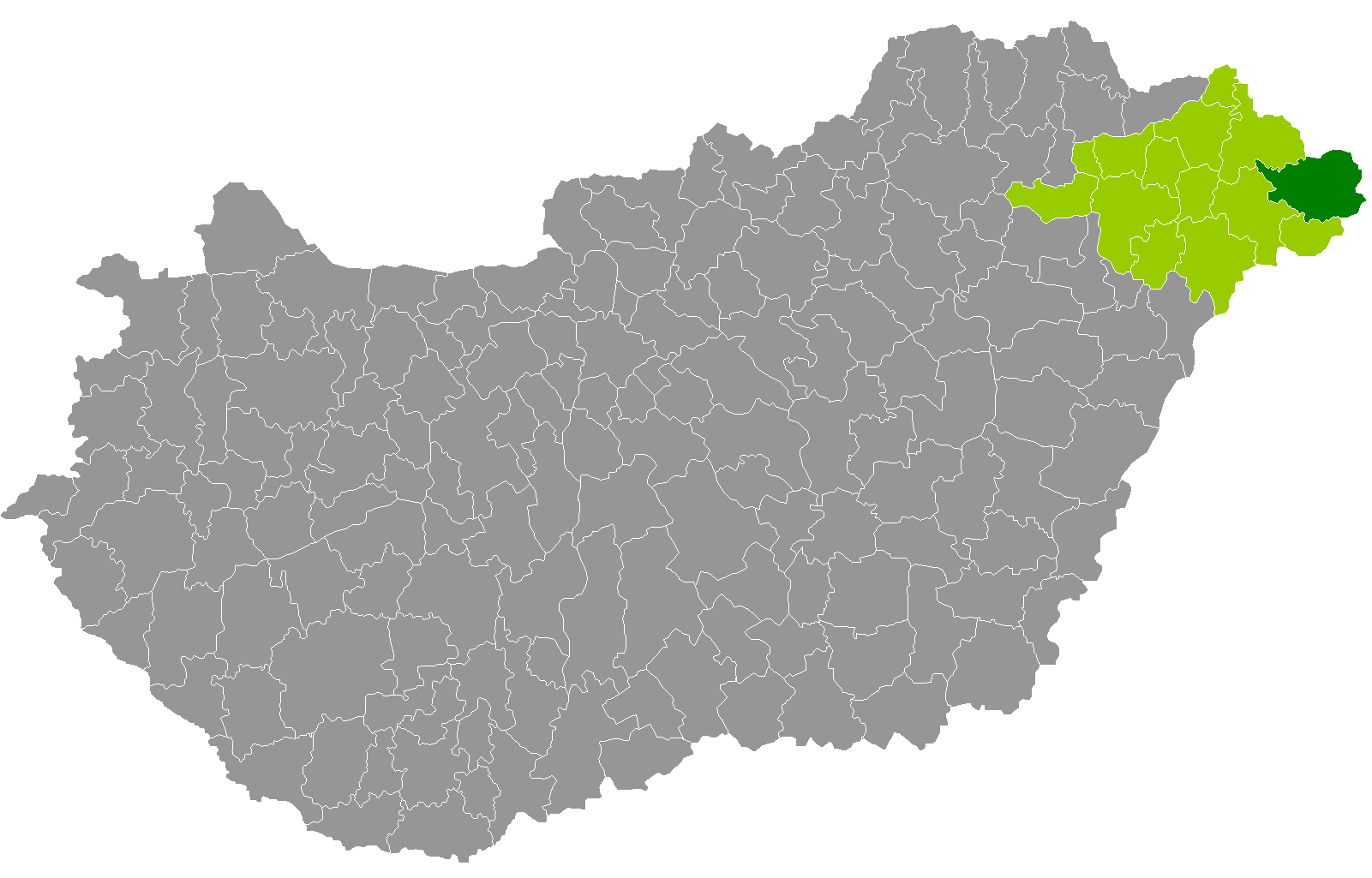
- Fehérgyarmat District within Hungary and Szabolcs-Szatmár-Bereg County.
- Country: Hungary
- County: Szabolcs-Szatmár-Bereg
- District seat: Fehérgyarmat

Area
  - Total: 707.37 km^{2} (273.12 sq mi)
  - Rank: 2nd in Szabolcs-Szatmár-Bereg

Population (2011 census)
  - Total: 37,259
  - Rank: 5th in Szabolcs-Szatmár-Bereg
  - Density: 53/km^{2} (140/sq mi)

Fehérgyarmat (Hungarian: Fehérgyarmati járás) is a district in eastern part of Szabolcs-Szatmár-Bereg County. Fehérgyarmat is also the name of the town where the district seat is found. The district is located in the Northern Great Plain Statistical Region. This district is a part of Szatmár historical and geographical region.

== Geography ==
Fehérgyarmat District borders with Vásárosnamény District and the Ukrainian oblast of Zakarpattia to the north, Romanian county of Satu Mare to the east, Csenger District to the south, Mátészalka District to the west. The number of the inhabited places in Fehérgyarmat District is 50.

== Municipalities ==
The district has 1 town, 2 large villages and 47 villages. (ordered by population, as of 1 January 2013)

- Botpalád (654)
- Cégénydányád (640)
- Csaholc (544)
- Császló (346)
- Csegöld (640)
- Darnó (169)
- **Fehérgyarmat** (7,967) – district seat
- Fülesd (446)
- Gacsály (898)
- Garbolc (154)
- Gyügye (240)
- Hermánszeg (240)
- Jánkmajtis (1,710)
- Kérsemjén (309)
- Kisar (1,076)
- Kishódos (79)
- Kisnamény (309)
- Kispalád (580)
- Kisszekeres (580)
- Kölcse (1,360)
- Kömörő (569)
- Magosliget (283)
- Mánd (254)
- Méhtelek (732)
- Milota (910)
- Nábrád (911)
- Nagyar (679)
- Nagyhódos (109)
- Nagyszekeres (557)
- Nemesborzova (85)
- Olcsvaapáti (281)
- Panyola (616)
- Penyige (731)
- Rozsály (814)
- Sonkád (723)
- Szamossályi (725)
- Szamosújlak (363)
- Szatmárcseke (1,508)
- Tiszabecs (1,111)
- Tiszacsécse (237)
- Tiszakóród (740)
- Tisztaberek (693)
- Tivadar (167)
- Tunyogmatolcs (2,466)
- Túristvándi (762)
- Túrricse (668)
- Uszka (427)
- Vámosoroszi (515)
- Zajta (406)
- Zsarolyán (380)

The bolded municipality is city, italics municipalities are large villages.

== Demographics ==
Religion in Fehérgyarmat District (2011 census)
1. Calvinism (62.4%)
2. Lutheranism (0.90%)
3. Catholic Church (7.90%)
4. Greek Catholicism (5.00%)
5. Orthodoxy (0.10%)
6. Other religions (2.70%)
7. Non-religious (5.20%)
8. Atheists (0.20%)
9. Undeclared (15.6%)

In 2011, it had a population of 37,259 and the population density was 53/km².

Year	County population	Change
2011	37,259	n/a

=== Ethnicity ===
Besides the Hungarian majority, the main minorities are the Roma (approx. 4,500), Ukrainian, Romanian and German (150).

Total population (2011 census): 37,259
Ethnic groups (2011 census): Identified themselves: 38,367 persons:

- Hungarians: 33,254 (86.67%)
- Gypsies: 4,578 (11.93%)
- Others and indefinable: 535 (1.39%)

Approx. 1,000 persons in Fehérgyarmat District did declare more than one ethnic group at the 2011 census.

=== Religion ===
Religious adherence in the county according to 2011 census:

- Reformed – 23,258;
- Catholic – 4,798 (Roman Catholic – 2,951; Greek Catholic – 1,847);
- Evangelical – 327;
- Orthodox – 39;
- other religions – 994;
- Non-religious – 1,935;
- Atheism – 80;
- Undeclared – 5,828.

== Gallery ==
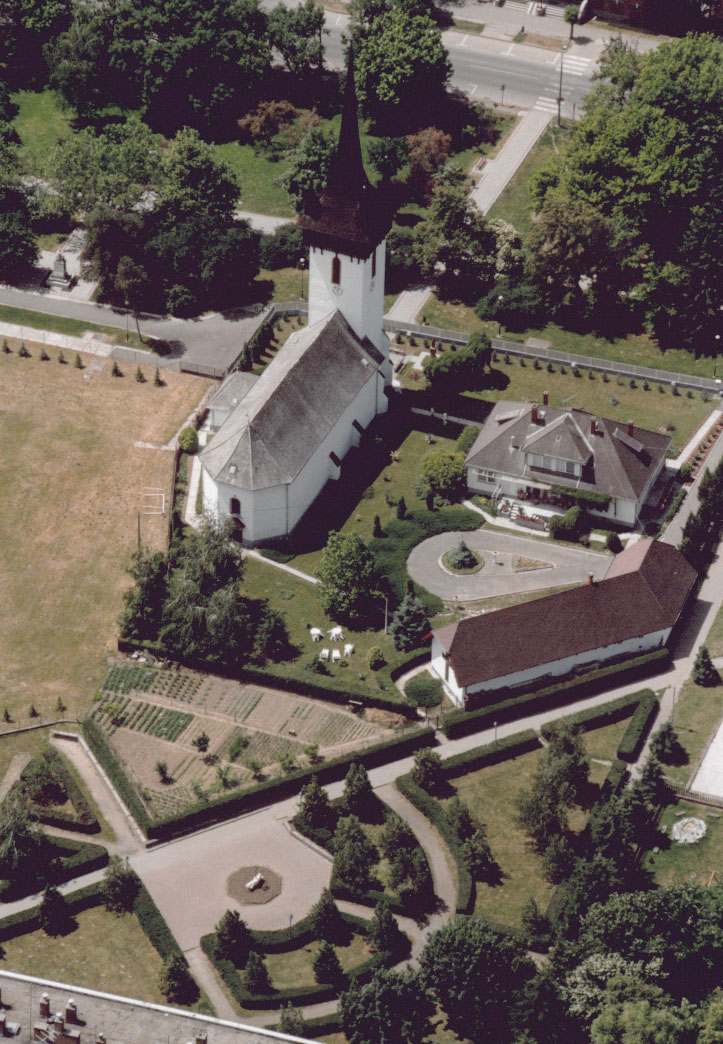
Fehérgyarmat, the district seat

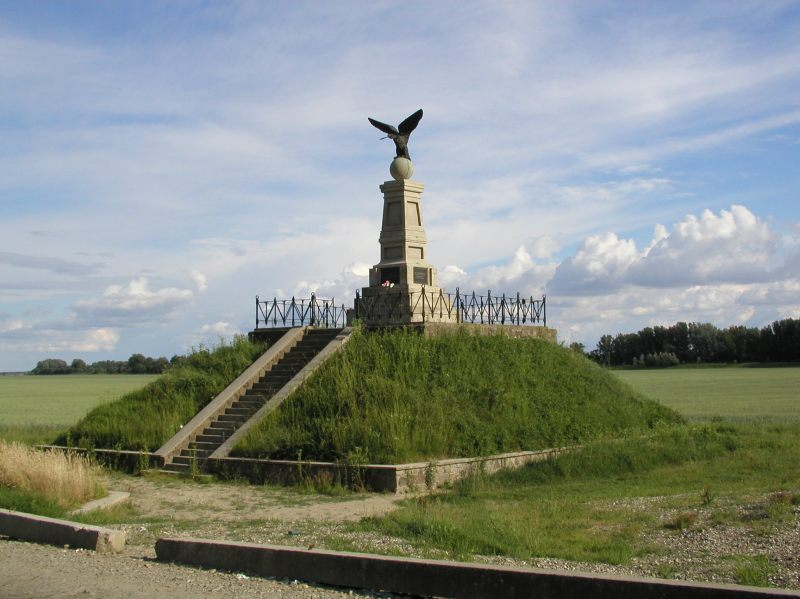
Turul Monument in Tiszabecs

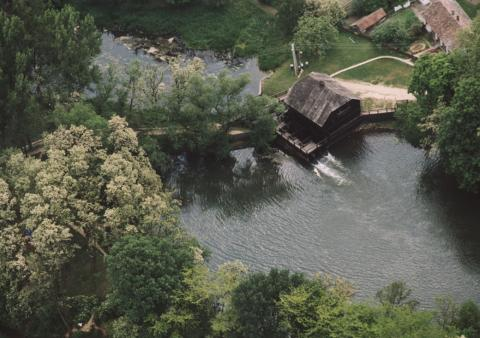
Watermill of Túristvándi

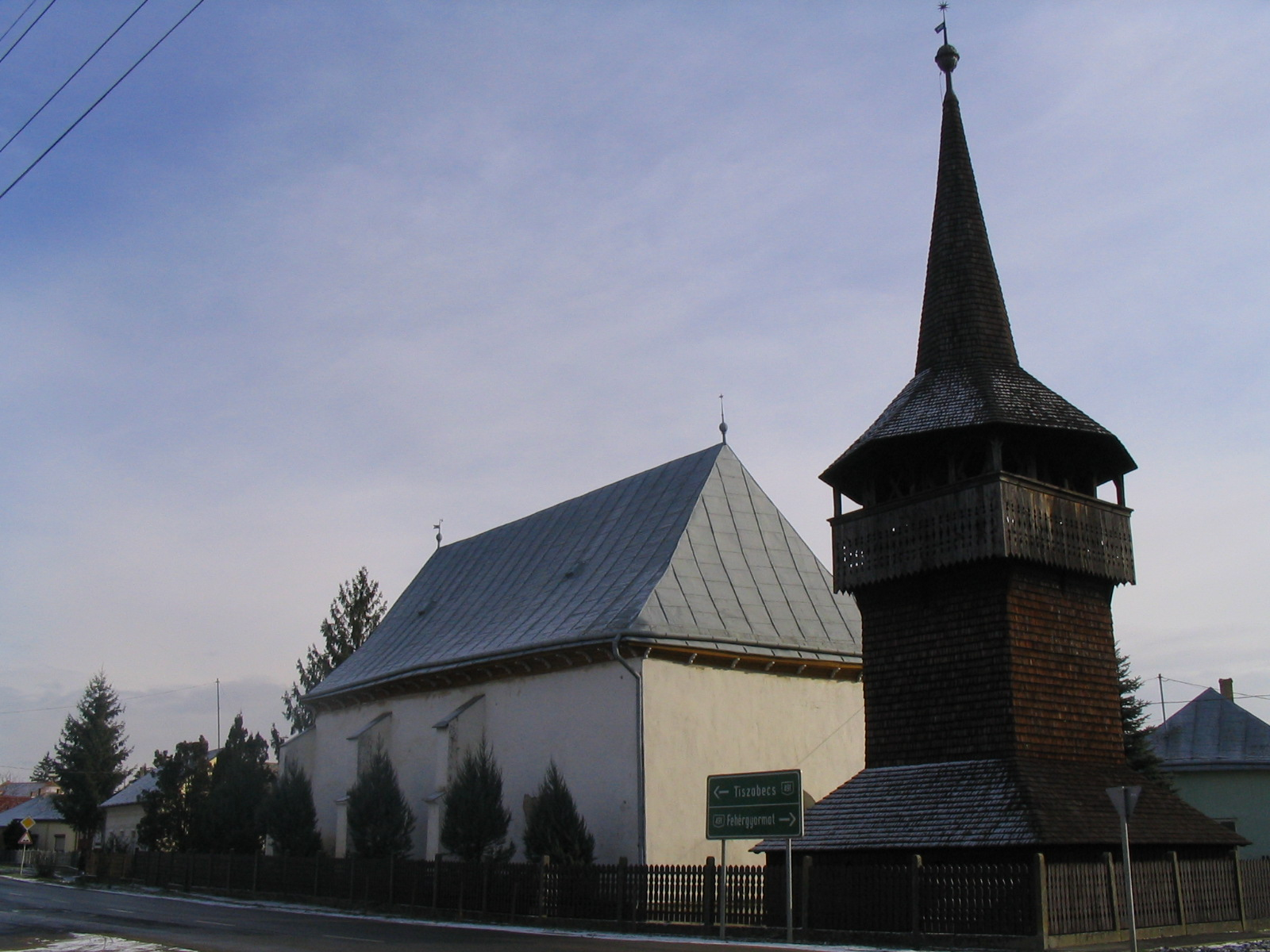
Wooden bell tower of Kölcse

== See also ==
- List of cities and towns of Hungary
