= List of settlements in Hungary by ethnic Ukrainian population =

This list contains Hungarian settlements in which ethnic Ukrainians make up over 1% of the total population, according to the 2022 census, ordered by their percentage of the local population.

According to the 2022 census, there are 19,064 Ukrainians in Hungary, who form at least 5% of the population in 6 settlements.

Settlement	Ukrainian name	County	Population	Ukrainian population
Nemesborzova	Немешборозва	Szabolcs-Szatmár-Bereg	109	9.5%
Várgesztes	Варгестеш	Komárom-Esztergom	748	8.9%
Debercsény	Деберчень	Nógrád	95	8.0%
Hetefejércse	–	Szabolcs-Szatmár-Bereg	285	5.6%
Márokpapi	Марокпапі	Szabolcs-Szatmár-Bereg	534	5.1%
Beregsurány	Береґшурань	Szabolcs-Szatmár-Bereg	672	5.0%
Barabás	Барабаш	Szabolcs-Szatmár-Bereg	812	4.2%
Gulács	Гулач	Szabolcs-Szatmár-Bereg	921	3.8%
Abod	Абод	Borsod-Abaúj-Zemplén	146	3.8%
Pusztafalu	Пустафалу	Borsod-Abaúj-Zemplén	186	3.2%
Mátyus	–	Szabolcs-Szatmár-Bereg	254	3.0%
Záhony	Загонь	Szabolcs-Szatmár-Bereg	3,831	2.8%
Detek	Детек	Borsod-Abaúj-Zemplén	269	2.8%
Gyügye	–	Szabolcs-Szatmár-Bereg	267	2.7%
Tarpa	Тарпа	Szabolcs-Szatmár-Bereg	2,366	2.5%
Tákos	Такош	Szabolcs-Szatmár-Bereg	352	2.3%
Mánd	Манд	Szabolcs-Szatmár-Bereg	261	2.3%
Kisecset	Кішечет	Nógrád	225	2.2%
Semjén	Шем'єн	Borsod-Abaúj-Zemplén	496	1.9%
Komoró	Коморо	Szabolcs-Szatmár-Bereg	1,152	1.8%
Nagyhódos	–	Szabolcs-Szatmár-Bereg	114	1.8%
Csárdaszállás	–	Békés	390	1.8%
Tiszadorogma	Тісадорогма	Borsod-Abaúj-Zemplén	346	1.8%
Hévíz	Гевіз	Zala	4,540	1.6%
Nábrád	Набрад	Szabolcs-Szatmár-Bereg	862	1.6%
Gelénes	Геленеш	Szabolcs-Szatmár-Bereg	536	1.6%
Túristvándi	–	Szabolcs-Szatmár-Bereg	673	1.5%
Tiszaújváros	Тисауйварош	Borsod-Abaúj-Zemplén	14,722	1.5%
Jászberény	Ясберень	Jász-Nagykun-Szolnok	26,210	1.4%
Kisvárda	Кішварда	Szabolcs-Szatmár-Bereg	15,114	1.4%
Kisnamény	Кішнамень	Szabolcs-Szatmár-Bereg	289	1.4%
Penyige	Пеньіге	Szabolcs-Szatmár-Bereg	710	1.4%
Tiszanagyfalu	–	Szabolcs-Szatmár-Bereg	1,747	1.4%
Szamossályi	–	Szabolcs-Szatmár-Bereg	613	1.3%
Ófehértó	–	Szabolcs-Szatmár-Bereg	2,439	1.3%
Zajta	Зайта	Szabolcs-Szatmár-Bereg	400	1.3%
Túrricse	Турріче	Szabolcs-Szatmár-Bereg	562	1.3%
Oroszlány	Орослань	Komárom-Esztergom	18,168	1.2%
Nyergesújfalu	–	Komárom-Esztergom	7,312	1.2%
Zsurk	Журк	Szabolcs-Szatmár-Bereg	623	1.2%
Tiszamogyorós	–	Szabolcs-Szatmár-Bereg	611	1.2%
Sonkád	Шонкад	Szabolcs-Szatmár-Bereg	691	1.2%
Szamosújlak	–	Szabolcs-Szatmár-Bereg	358	1.2%
Fényeslitke	–	Szabolcs-Szatmár-Bereg	2,283	1.2%
Tiszabecs	Тісабеч	Szabolcs-Szatmár-Bereg	1,150	1.2%
Szatmárcseke	–	Szabolcs-Szatmár-Bereg	1,495	1.1%
Nyírlövő	–	Szabolcs-Szatmár-Bereg	646	1.1%
Mezőladány	–	Szabolcs-Szatmár-Bereg	946	1.1%
Tisztaberek	Тістаберек	Szabolcs-Szatmár-Bereg	615	1.1%
Csaroda	Чарода	Szabolcs-Szatmár-Bereg	551	1.1%
Tiszakóród	Тисакород	Szabolcs-Szatmár-Bereg	732	1.1%
Árpás	Арпаш	Győr-Moson-Sopron	259	1.1%
Alsógagy	–	Borsod-Abaúj-Zemplén	90	1.1%
Bana	Бана	Komárom-Esztergom	1,530	1.1%
Kisrozvágy	–	Borsod-Abaúj-Zemplén	204	1.0%
Olcsva	Ольчва	Szabolcs-Szatmár-Bereg	700	1.0%
Nyírtass	–	Szabolcs-Szatmár-Bereg	1,805	1.0%
Biri	Бірі	Szabolcs-Szatmár-Bereg	1,265	1.0%
Cégénydányád	–	Szabolcs-Szatmár-Bereg	613	1.0%
Újkenéz	–	Szabolcs-Szatmár-Bereg	927	1.0%
Döge	–	Szabolcs-Szatmár-Bereg	2,061	1.0%
Beregdaróc	Берегдароц	Szabolcs-Szatmár-Bereg	905	1.0%
Tuzsér	Тужер	Szabolcs-Szatmár-Bereg	3,224	1.0%
Mosonmagyaróvár	Мошонмадяровар	Győr-Moson-Sopron	33,779	1.0%
Hegyeshalom	–	Győr-Moson-Sopron	3,753	1.0%
