= Kende =

Title of early Hungarian kings

The kende (or kündü) was one of the kings of the dual-monarchy of the early Hungarians along with the gyula or war-chief. The function of the kende is believed to have been a religious one ("sacral prince"). At the time of the Magyar migration to Pannonia, the kende was named Kurszán. Upon Kurszán's death in a raid in approximately 904 CE, the office was taken up by the gyula Árpád, creating a single-head monarchy for Hungary. Though there are some scholars (for example Gyula Kristó) who believe that Árpád was the kende, who later took up the functions of the gyula.

Some scholars have speculated that the early Magyar dual kingship derived from their time as vassals of the Khazars. Indeed, the Khazars were described by Ahmad ibn Fadlan as having an officer titled Kündür which may have been either identical to, a model for, or the forerunner of the office of kende.

== House of Kende ==
Kende also refers to the noble Hungarian House of Kende settled in the eastern region of the Austro-Hungarian monarchy of Kölcse. In 1181, the family received several settlements from the king: Kölcse, Istvándi, Kóród, Csécse, Cseke, Milota, Czégény.

== Sources ==
- Nagy Iván, "Magyarország családai (Houses of Hungary)"
- Borovszky Samu, "Szatmár vármegye (The County of Szatmár)"
