= Uszka (village) =

Coordinates: 48°04′N 22°52′E

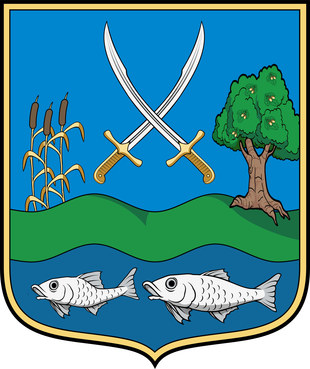
- Coat of arms
- Interactive map of Uszka
- Country: Hungary
- County: Szabolcs-Szatmár-Bereg County
- District: Fehérgyarmat District

Area
  - Total: 7.36 km^{2} (2.84 sq mi)

Population (2015)
  - Total: 454
  - Density: 61.9/km^{2} (160/sq mi)
- Time zone: UTC+1 (CET)
  - Summer (DST): UTC+2 (CEST)
- Postal code: 4524
- Area code: 45
- Website: http://www.uszka.hu/magunkrol.html

Uszka is a village in Szabolcs-Szatmár-Bereg county, in the Northern Great Plain region of eastern Hungary. It is a small Hungarian village along the Hungarian-Ukrainian border.

== Geography ==
It covers an area of 7.36 km^{2} (3 sq mi) and has a population of 454 people (2015).

== History ==
The name Uszka is first mentioned in documents in 1462 as Wyzka. Until the 15th century it belonged to the Bökényi family.

Before 1462, the Fathers also had a share here, which was then given to the Rozsályi Kúnok, and in 1476 the Gachályi also bought parts, so most of the border belonged to the Rozsályi manor until the end of the 17th century.

István Rosályi Kún gave the Uszka to Ilona Kún's children in the daughter quarter: the Bessenye family, with the pleasure that the Uská serfs could cross the Tiszabecs ferry and the Rózsály bridge without duty.

In the 18th century it had several owners, including the Forray, Márton, Longer, Szentpétery, and Szabó families, and then in the early 1800s the Thúry, Gál, Ary, Kardos, Szilágyi, and Enyedi families also owned it.

On the Tiszabecs side of the border of Uszka, on the common border with it, stands the Champion vineyard. In 1703 there was a battle in Tiszabecs in the part called Bajnokdűlő. The village was completely destroyed at that time, and then settled in its new, present-day location.

== Economy ==
Gravel mining is carried out in the settlement, it is one of the largest employers in the settlement. There is also agricultural work due to the location of the settlement.

== Religion ==
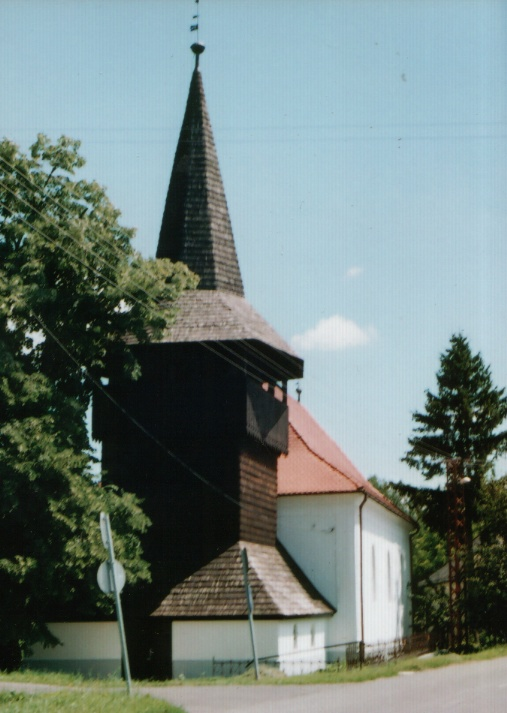
Reformed Church

The Reformed Church was built in 1805, a towerless building with a wooden belfry next to it.
