= Szatmárcseke =

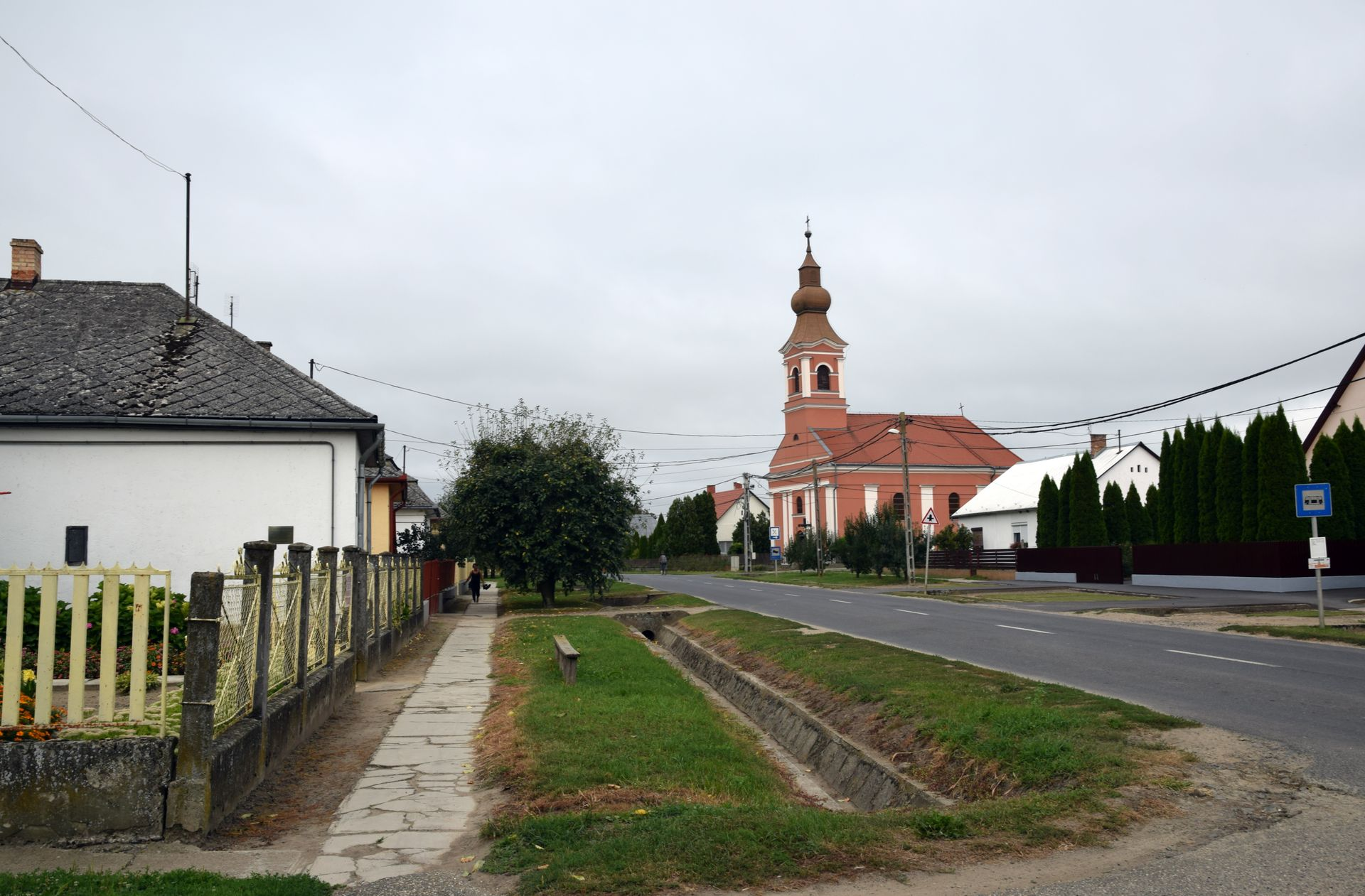
- The Catholic church
- Interactive map of Szatmárcseke
- Location within Szabolcs-Szatmár-Bereg County Location within Hungary
- Coordinates: 48°5′9.28″N 22°37′51.74″E
- Country: Hungary
- County: Szabolcs-Szatmár-Bereg
- District: Fehérgyarmat

Area
  - Total: 36.31 km^{2} (14.02 sq mi)

Population (2010)
  - Total: 1,558
  - Density: 39.14/km^{2} (101.4/sq mi)
- Time zone: UTC+1 (CET)
  - Summer (DST): UTC+2 (CEST)
- Postal code: 4945
- Area code: 44
- Website: http://szatmarcseke.hu/

Szatmárcseke is a village in Szabolcs-Szatmár-Bereg county, in the Northern Great Plain region of eastern Hungary.

== Geography ==
It lies at a distance of 94 km from Nyíregyháza, 29 km from Vásárosnamény, 17 km from Fehérgyarmat, 18 km from Tiszabecs, and 11 km from Tiszacsécse.

== History ==
The first written mention of the village arose in 1181 as Cseke. This time it was a thriving village that owned a church.
