= Rozsály =

- Village
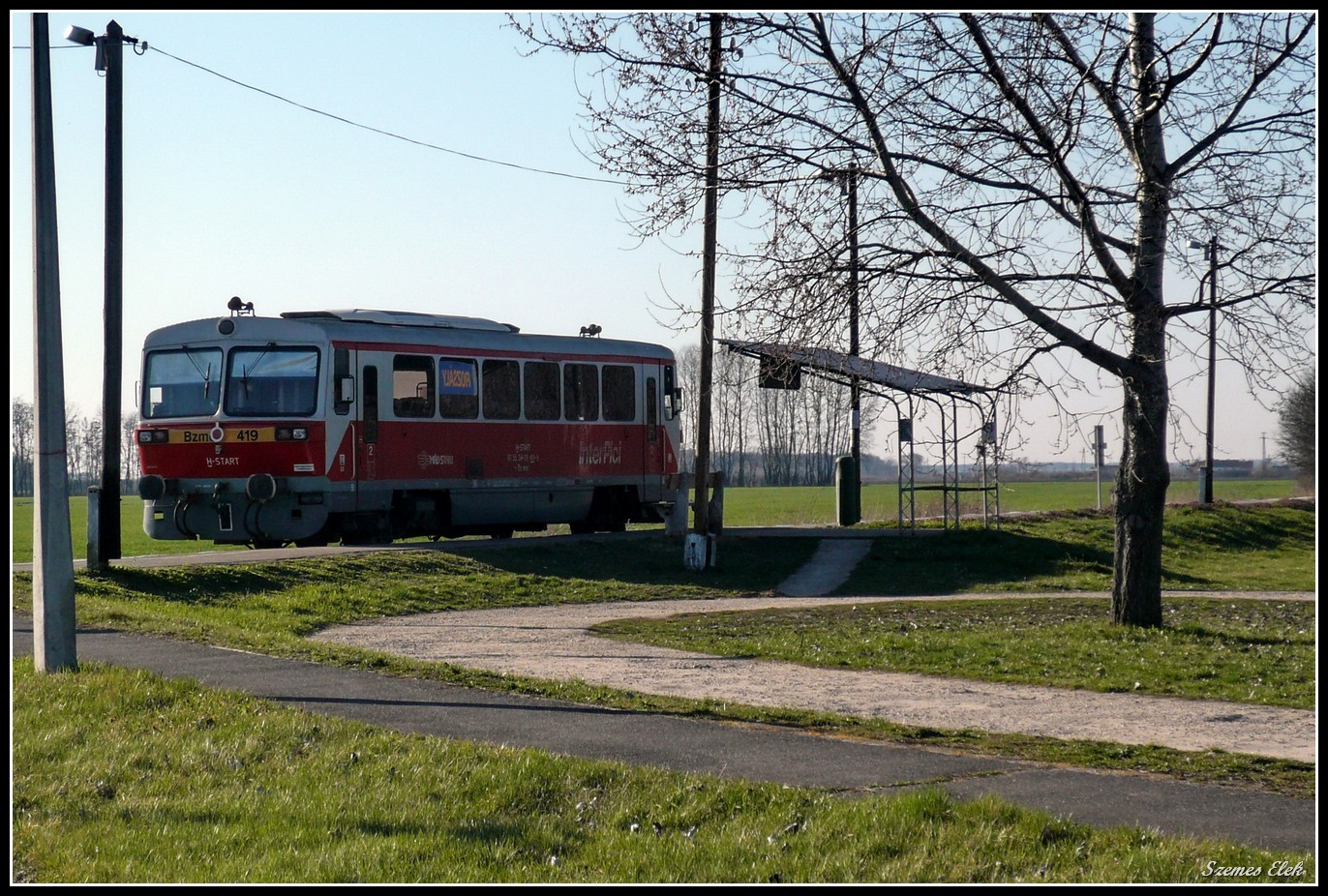
- Train station in Rozsály

- Coat of arms

- Location of Rozsály in Hungary
- Country: Hungary
- County: Szabolcs-Szatmár-Bereg
- District: Fehérgyarmat District

Government
  - Mayor: Zoltán Sztolyka (Fidesz-KDNP)

Area
  - Total: 14.87 km^{2} (5.74 sq mi)

Population (2022)
  - Total: 622
- Time zone: UTC+1 (CET)
  - Summer (DST): UTC+2 (CEST)
- Postal code: 4971
- Area code: 44
- Website: rozsaly.hu

Rozsály is a village in Fehérgyarmat District, Szabolcs-Szatmár-Bereg county, in the Northern Great Plain region of eastern Hungary. As of 2023 it has an estimated population of 603.

== History ==
Rozsály has been inhabited since ancient times. In the Bronze Age, the village was home to a foundry, whose remains, along with bronze weapons, were found in archeological excavations. The village appears in writing in 1332, and it appears the village had long been inhabited by this time.

== Demographics ==
As of 2023, the village had a total population of 603. As of 2022, the town was 91.3% Hungarian, and 22% Gypsy. The population was 46.2% Reformed, 23.4% Greek Catholic, and 5% Roman Catholic.
