= Semjén, Hungary =

Coordinates: 48°21′N 21°58′E

Semjén
- Village
- Interactive map of Semjén
- Country: Hungary
- Regions: Northern Hungary
- County: Borsod-Abaúj-Zemplén County
- Time zone: UTC+1 (CET)
  - Summer (DST): UTC+2 (CEST)

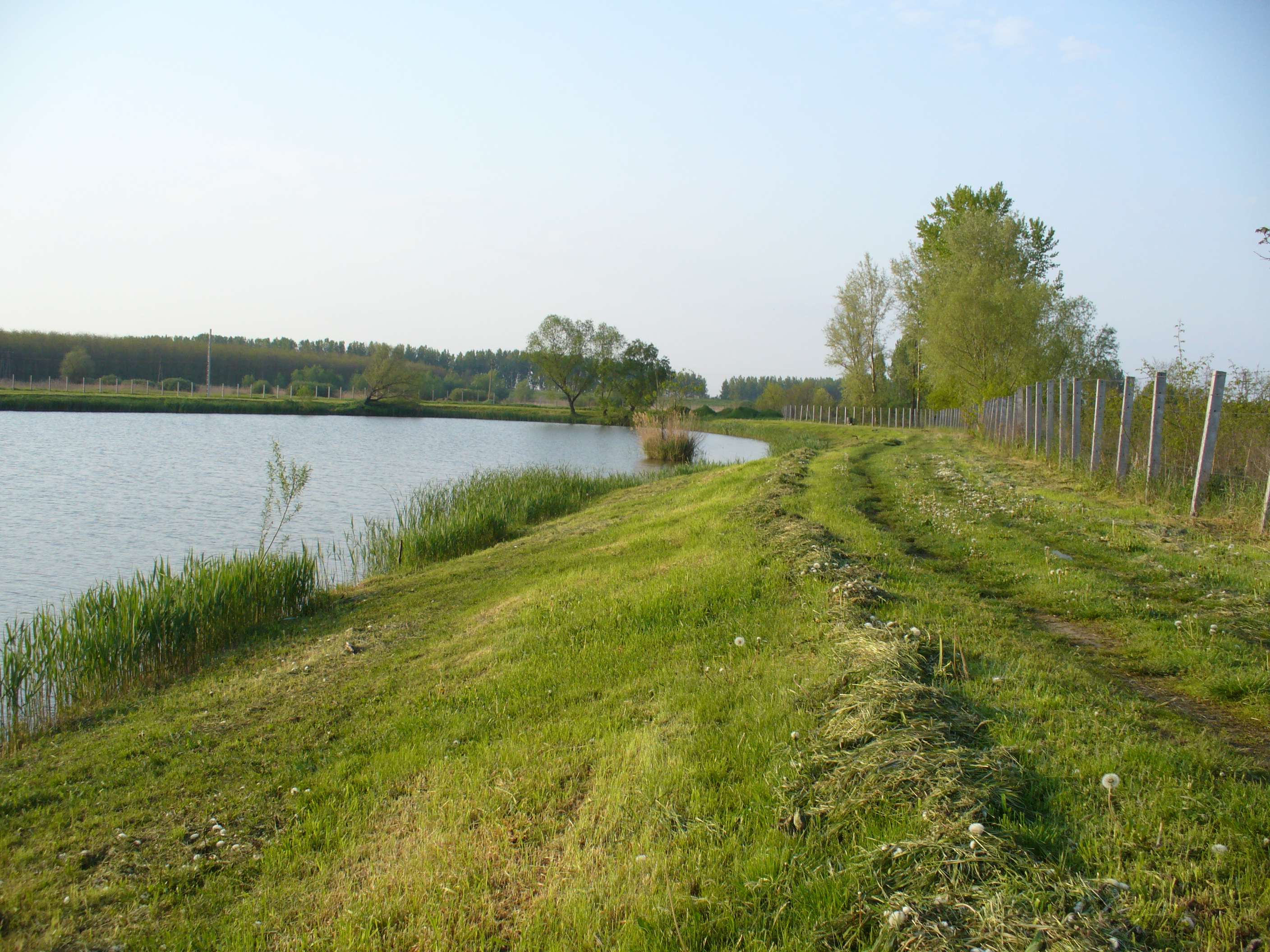
Fishing lake in Semjén

Semjén is a village in Borsod-Abaúj-Zemplén County in northeastern Hungary.
