= Csegöld =

Coordinates: 47°54′N 22°41′E

- Interactive map of Csegöld
- Country: Hungary
- County: Szabolcs-Szatmár-Bereg

Area
  - Total: 19.35 km^{2} (7.47 sq mi)

Population (2015)
  - Total: 671
  - Density: 34.7/km^{2} (90/sq mi)
- Time zone: UTC+1 (CET)
  - Summer (DST): UTC+2 (CEST)
- Postal code: 4742
- Area code: 44

Location of Szabolcs-Szatmar-Bereg county in Hungary

Csegöld is a village in Szabolcs-Szatmár-Bereg county, in the Northern Great Plain region of eastern Hungary.

== Geography ==
It covers an area of 19.35 km^{2} (7 sq mi) and has a population of 671 people (2015).
