= Méhtelek =

Coordinates: 47°56′N 22°51′E

- Interactive map of Méhtelek
- Country: Hungary
- County: Szabolcs-Szatmár-Bereg

Area
  - Total: 8.62 km^{2} (3.33 sq mi)

Population (2015)
  - Total: 759
  - Density: 87.9/km^{2} (228/sq mi)
- Time zone: UTC+1 (CET)
  - Summer (DST): UTC+2 (CEST)
- Postal code: 4975
- Area code: 44

Location of Szabolcs-Szatmar-Bereg county in Hungary

Méhtelek is a village in Szabolcs-Szatmár-Bereg county, in the Northern Great Plain region of eastern Hungary.

== Geography ==
It covers an area of 8.62 km^{2} (3 sq mi) and has a population of 759 people (2015).

== History ==
The village was somewhat put on the map after catastrophic floods in the region in the late 1960s. Valuable archaeological finds – possibly going back to 5000 BC – were uncovered during the reconstruction of the settlement.
