= Gacsály =

Coordinates: 47°56′N 22°46′E

- Interactive map of Gacsály
- Country: Hungary
- County: Szabolcs-Szatmár-Bereg

Area
  - Total: 19.82 km^{2} (7.65 sq mi)

Population (2015)
  - Total: 918
  - Density: 46.4/km^{2} (120/sq mi)
- Time zone: UTC+1 (CET)
  - Summer (DST): UTC+2 (CEST)
- Postal code: 4972
- Area code: 44

Location of Szabolcs-Szatmar-Bereg county in Hungary

Gacsály is a village in Szabolcs-Szatmár-Bereg county, in the Northern Great Plain region of eastern Hungary.

== Geography ==
It covers an area of 19.82 km^{2} (8 sq mi) and has a population of 918 people (2015).
