= Botpalád =

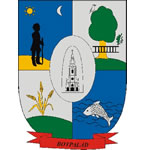
- Coat of arms

- Location of Botpalád in Hungary
- Coordinates: 48.03°N 22.8°E
- Country: Hungary
- Region: Northern Great Plain
- County: Szabolcs-Szatmár-Bereg

Area
  - Total: 16.5 km^{2} (6.4 sq mi)

Population (2013)
  - Total: 654
  - Density: 39.6/km^{2} (103/sq mi)
- Time zone: UTC+1 (CET)
  - Summer (DST): UTC+2 (CEST)
- Postal code: 4955
- Area code: +36 44

Botpalád is a village in Szabolcs-Szatmár-Bereg county, in the Northern Great Plain region of eastern Hungary.

== Geography ==
It covers an area of 16.5 km^{2} (6 sq mi) and has a population of 654 people (2013 estimate).

== Population ==
Year	1980	1990	2001	2010	2011	2013
Population	671 (census)	546 (census)	583 (census)	605 (estimate)	610 (census)	654 (estimate)
