= Kömörő =

Coordinates: 48°01′N 22°35′E

- Flag
- Interactive map of Kömörő
- Country: Hungary
- County: Szabolcs-Szatmár-Bereg

Area
  - Total: 16.37 km^{2} (6.32 sq mi)

Population (2015)
  - Total: 571
  - Density: 34.9/km^{2} (90/sq mi)
- Time zone: UTC+1 (CET)
  - Summer (DST): UTC+2 (CEST)
- Postal code: 4943
- Area code: 44

Location of Szabolcs-Szatmár-Bereg County in Hungary

Kömörő is a village in Szabolcs-Szatmár-Bereg County, in the Northern Great Plain region of eastern Hungary.

== Etymology ==
The name comes from the Slavic *komarъ (a mosquito) with the suffix -ov. 1181 Kemerew.

== Geography ==
It covers an area of 16.37 km^{2} (6 sq mi) and has a population of 571 people (2015).
