= Kérsemjén =

Coordinates: 48°01′N 22°25′E

- Interactive map of Kérsemjén
- Country: Hungary
- County: Szabolcs-Szatmár-Bereg

Area
  - Total: 7.08 km^{2} (2.73 sq mi)

Population (2015)
  - Total: 290
  - Density: 47.74/km^{2} (123.6/sq mi)
- Time zone: UTC+1 (CET)
  - Summer (DST): UTC+2 (CEST)
- Postal code: 4912
- Area code: 44

Location of Szabolcs-Szatmar-Bereg county in Hungary

Kérsemjén is a village in Szabolcs-Szatmár-Bereg county, in the Northern Great Plain region of eastern Hungary.

== Geography ==
It covers an area of 7.08 km^{2} (3 sq mi) and has a population of 290 people (2015).
