= Panyola =

Coordinates: 48°03′N 22°24′E

- Interactive map of Panyola
- Country: Hungary
- County: Szabolcs-Szatmár-Bereg

Area
  - Total: 12.23 km^{2} (4.72 sq mi)

Population (2001)
  - Total: 642
  - Density: 52.49/km^{2} (135.9/sq mi)
- Time zone: UTC+1 (CET)
  - Summer (DST): UTC+2 (CEST)
- Postal code: 4913
- Area code: 44

Location of Szabolcs-Szatmar-Bereg county in Hungary

Panyola is a village in Szabolcs-Szatmár-Bereg county, in the Northern Great Plain region of eastern Hungary.

== Geography ==
It covers an area of 12.23 km^{2} (5 sq mi) and has a population of 642 people (2001).
