= Kisszekeres =

Coordinates: 47°58′N 22°38′E

- Interactive map of Kisszekeres
- Country: Hungary
- County: Szabolcs-Szatmár-Bereg

Area
  - Total: 14.67 km^{2} (5.66 sq mi)

Population (2015)
  - Total: 555
  - Density: 37.9/km^{2} (98/sq mi)
- Time zone: UTC+1 (CET)
  - Summer (DST): UTC+2 (CEST)
- Postal code: 4963
- Area code: 44

Location of Szabolcs-Szatmar-Bereg county in Hungary

Kisszekeres is a village in Szabolcs-Szatmár-Bereg county, in the Northern Great Plain region of eastern Hungary.

== Geography ==
It covers an area of 14.67 km^{2} (5.66 sq mi) and has a population of 555 people (2015).
