= Csaroda =

Coordinates: 48°10′N 22°28′E

- Interactive map of Csaroda
- Country: Hungary
- County: Szabolcs-Szatmár-Bereg

Area
  - Total: 24.68 km^{2} (9.53 sq mi)

Population (2001)
  - Total: 654
  - Density: 26.5/km^{2} (69/sq mi)
- Time zone: UTC+1 (CET)
  - Summer (DST): UTC+2 (CEST)
- Postal code: 4844
- Area code: 45

Location of Szabolcs-Szatmar-Bereg county in Hungary

Csaroda is a village in Szabolcs-Szatmár-Bereg county, in the Northern Great Plain region of eastern Hungary.

== Geography ==
It covers an area of 24.68 km^{2} (10 sq mi) and has a population of 654 people (2001).

== Setting ==
Csaroda is in Szabolcs-Szatmár-Bereg county, on the Beregi-plane, near to Nyíregyháza (73 km) and to Vásárosnamény (12 km).

== History ==
Csaroda and its vicinity was first mentioned in written form in 1299 (sacerdos de Charnawoda). Its name comes from the river name Čierna (Čarná) voda — in Slavic languages "Black water" where it is set (1270 fluv. Chernauoda). In the 13th century, the Káta family were the landowners of the village. In the 14th century, the Csaroda family was the landowner, a leading family of Bereg county. In 1446, Vetési family, from 1461 to 1476 the Tegzes, Drágfy, Daróczy and Újhelyi families were the landowners, later the Lónyai, Rédey and Bay family, finally the Teleky counts.

Jews lived in Csaroda for many years until they were murdered in The Holocaust

== Sightseeings ==
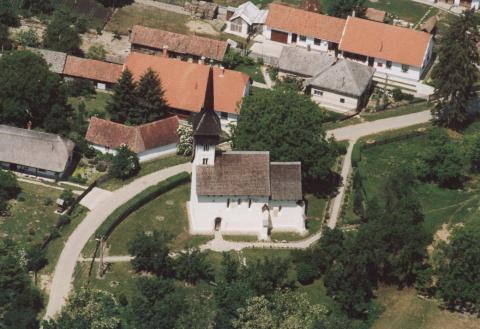

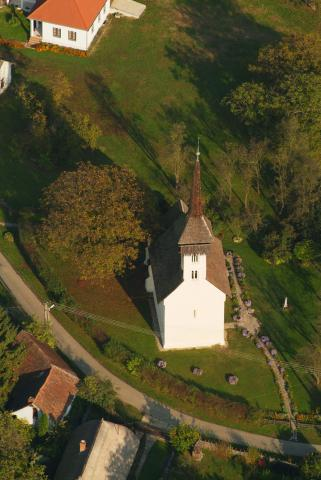

Csaroda has its beautiful little 13th-century Romanesque village church with 14th-century Gothic frescos, 17th-century paintings and wood-carvings. An old wooden bell-tower stands by the church (13th century)

== Bibliography ==
- Dercsényi D. (1972): Románkori építészet Magyarországon. Corvina, Budapest
- Gerevich T. (1938): Magyarország románkori emlékei. (Die romanische Denkmäler Ungarns.) Egyetemi nyomda. Budapest
- Gerő, L. (1984): Magyar műemléki ABC. (Hungarian Architectural Heritage ABC.) Budapest
- Henszlmann, I. (1876): Magyarország ó-keresztyén, román és átmeneti stylü mű-emlékeinek rövid ismertetése, (Old-Christian, Romanesque and Transitional Style Architecture in Hungary). Királyi Magyar Egyetemi Nyomda, Budapest
