= Zsarolyán =

- Coat of arms

- Location of Zsarolyán in Hungary
- Coordinates: 47.95°N 22.6°E
- Country: Hungary
- Region: Northern Great Plain
- County: Szabolcs-Szatmár-Bereg

Area
  - Total: 6.39 km^{2} (2.47 sq mi)

Population (2012)
  - Total: 388
  - Density: 60.7/km^{2} (157/sq mi)
- Time zone: UTC+1 (CET)
  - Summer (DST): UTC+2 (CEST)
- Postal code: 4961
- Area code: +36 44

Zsarolyán is a village in Szabolcs-Szatmár-Bereg county, in the Northern Great Plain region of eastern Hungary.

== Geography ==
It covers an area of 6.39 km^{2} (2 sq mi) and has a population of 460 people (2002).

== History ==
Zsarolyán Árpádian settlement. Its name appears as early as 1181 in the border crossing of Szekeres in the form of ad lacum Sarolyan, where a lake is so named as a signpost, and from 1270 to 1772 it was mentioned in the diplomas as Sarolan. In 1328 p. Zerelyen, 1333 p. Sorollyany, written in the form Saralyan in 1380.

His name was written as Zorolan in 1308, when Péter Jurk's son (Gyügyei) filed a lawsuit against him, and he got an ancient one: István V. in 1271 and IV. With the certificates of the kings, László proved that his father's brother, Maccabeus, had taken land from them in Zsarolyán, a German guest, whose sons, Albert and Barnabas, later sold Szekeres and Zsarolyán to the sons of Márton and Benedict of the Kaplon family for 15 M. As early as the 1300s, Peter's descendants wrote themselves as Zsarolyánians. The Zsarolyán family continued to be the main owner until the end of the 17th century.

A 14-15. században a Szekeres családnak volt még itt nagyobb birtoka.

A 16-17. In the 16th century, several families, such as István Báthori in 1507 and the Csányi, Almási, Nyíri, Zsarolyáni and Tőke families, got property here.

In the 18th century, partly new owners replaced the old ones. In 1754 László Klobusiczky was also a part-owner, and at the end of the century it was owned by the Jeney, Sámé, Veres, Márton, Szerdahelyi, Váry, Cséke, Mészáros, Pathó and Újlaki families.

The whole locality was inhabited until the middle of the 19th century.

In 1730, Borka Tóth from Zsarolyán, the wife of János Sárosi, was burned for witchcraft in the market of Nagykároly. This case is sung by József Gvadányi in The Notary Public of Peleske, where it is performed as Dorka Tóti.

Sámely plain also belonged to the village. It was once a populated settlement. It was the ancient property of the Sámi family. The family has been known as Sámelházi since 1421. In addition to them, the Zsarolyán and Pátyodi families also owned part of it.

In 1507 it was already barren, and István Báthori received it. In 1504 the whole belonged to Mihály Mutnoky. In 1549 the families of Zsarolyán, Transylvania, Gál, Fodor and Rápolthy also had property here.

In 1750 Sándor Nagy and György Nádorispáni received a royal donation in 1754, and László Klobusiczky received a royal donation. Data on the settlement were available until the mid-1800s.
