= Tiszamogyorós =

Coordinates: 48°19′N 22°13′E

- Interactive map of Tiszamogyorós
- Country: Hungary
- County: Szabolcs-Szatmár-Bereg

Area
  - Total: 10.25 km^{2} (3.96 sq mi)

Population (2015)
  - Total: 715
  - Density: 69.8/km^{2} (181/sq mi)
- Time zone: UTC+1 (CET)
  - Summer (DST): UTC+2 (CEST)
- Postal code: 4645
- Area code: 45
- Website: http://www.tiszamogyoros.hu

Location of Szabolcs-Szatmar-Bereg county in Hungary

Tiszamogyorós is a village in Szabolcs-Szatmár-Bereg county, in the Northern Great Plain region of eastern Hungary. East of Mándok, no. Tiszamogyorós is located in the North of Nyírség, in a landscape called Tiszamogyorós. The village, which suffered a lot from the floods of the Tisza, moved to its current fourth place in 1864.

== Geography ==
It covers an area of 10.25 km^{2} (4 sq mi) and has a population of 715 people (2015).

== History ==
It got its name from the typical plant of the area, the hazelnut, nevertheless, today, unfortunately, there are no traces of the hazelnut bush groves of the Árpádian period, and even the hazelnut bush can be found only rarely.

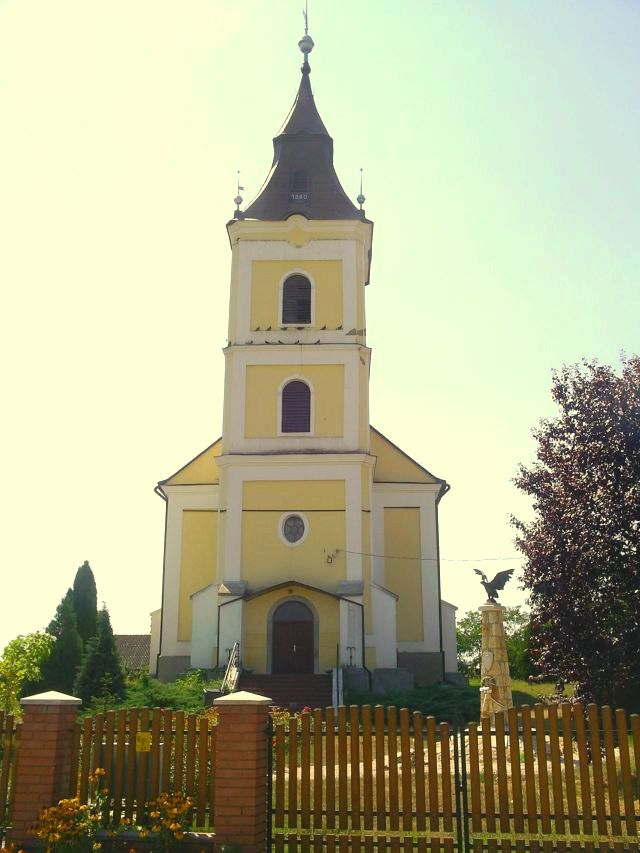
Reformed Church - Tiszamogyorós, Hungary

The founders of the village were members of the Gutkeled clan. Its first mention dates from 1297. According to the diploma, the field called Monoros had previously been pledged by the father of the father of the father, the father of the father of the father, to the relatives of the father of the father. It appears that the estate was expropriated from the pledge because the XIV. In the first half of the 19th century, István, the son of Apaj, was the owner of Slavonian vicebán until his death in 1342. After that, after a long lawsuit, the relatives of the side branches, the Bacska family and the Berencsi family, divided the estates of István, the son of Apaj, among themselves.

The people of Bacska got the areas beyond the Drava, the villages of Berencsiek became the villages of Nyírség, including Mogyorós.

In the XVI. It was owned by the Anarcsi Tegzes, who broke away from the Berencsi family until the end of the 19th century. A member of this family was the infamous Borbála Anarcsi Tegzes, who beheaded his former suitor Miklós Bornemissza with his men in a dream at night in his mansion in Kerecseny.

In 1588 a mention is made of the mansion of István Anarcsi. The Anarcsi part was taken hostage in 1588 by Gergely Lónyay, who soon attacked the village with a gun.

Many of the families still living today already lived here: Berta, Fónagy, László, Őik, Szél. The Straws settled in the village in the 1620s and the Ruffles around 1660.

In 1678, after the death of György Bacskay-Újlaki, the village passed to the royal treasury.

In 1683 he received it as a donation from the Vay family.

In the national census of 1720, only 8 families of serfs were recorded, but surely more than that lived in the village.

In 1746, with the hands of Borbála Vay, Count János Teleki was also a landlord, after 1784, as a property of Borbála Czobel, there were already 282 inhabitants.

The Reformed Mother Church in Mogyorós was established in 1747 courtesy of Count Borbála Vay. It used to be a branch of Mándok.

Between 1782 and 1985, the military descriptors of Szabolcs County recorded it as Mogyorós. At that time, a larger, sparse forest stretched between the sand dunes in the village. Its meadows were bushy, very swampy, and the larger, never-drying swamps were overgrown with reeds. In the direction of Eperjeske there was a row of sand dunes, on the Tisza River a thousand steps away there was a ferry. In the Geographical Dictionary of Elek Fényes (1851) it is listed as the village of Mogyorós in Szabolcs County with 406 inhabitants and fertile fields. The Tisza spoiled many times over to the village, which has always moved away to its fourth place today. We know from the letter of the village prefecture dated 24 May 1864 that the older places of the village are known: “ where the settlement was once the third place, it is now used as arable land… "The monograph of Szabolcs County (1939) has already shown its current location: primary production provided livelihoods on small and dwarf estates to 873 inhabitants of the 1620-acre, wooded, pasture settlement.

At the turn of the century, the village underwent spectacular development. Its population exceeded a thousand, when its new street leading to Mándok (today's Szabadság Street, formerly Erzsébet Street) was built. The First World War did not leave Mogyorós untouched either, 15 people sacrificed their lives for their homeland.

At the beginning of the century, the whole village was almost destroyed in a fire, after which houses with adobe walls and tin roofs were built.
