= Kishódos =

Coordinates: 47°58′N 22°50′E

- Interactive map of Kishódos
- Country: Hungary
- County: Szabolcs-Szatmár-Bereg

Area
  - Total: 8.92 km^{2} (3.44 sq mi)

Population (2015)
  - Total: 68
  - Density: 9.87/km^{2} (25.6/sq mi)
- Time zone: UTC+1 (CET)
  - Summer (DST): UTC+2 (CEST)
- Postal code: 4977
- Area code: 44

Location of Szabolcs-Szatmar-Bereg county in Hungary

Kishódos is a village in Szabolcs-Szatmár-Bereg county, in the Northern Great Plain region of eastern Hungary.

== Geography ==
It covers an area of 8.92 km^{2} (3 sq mi) and, as of 2015, had a population of 68.
