= Kisar, Hungary =

Coordinates: 48°03′N 22°30′E

Kisar
- Interactive map of Kisar
- Country: Hungary
- County: Szabolcs-Szatmár-Bereg

Area
  - Total: 15.43 km^{2} (5.96 sq mi)

Population (2015)
  - Total: 1,145
  - Density: 59/km^{2} (150/sq mi)
- Time zone: UTC+1 (CET)
  - Summer (DST): UTC+2 (CEST)
- Postal code: 4948
- Area code: 44

Location of Szabolcs-Szatmar-Bereg county in Hungary

Kisar is a village in Szabolcs-Szatmár-Bereg county, in the Northern Great Plain region of eastern Hungary.

== Geography ==
It covers an area of 15.43 km^{2} (6 sq mi) and has a population of 1,145 people (2015).

The village is located on the Tisa River, with the village of Tivadar on the other side of the river.
