= Olcsvaapáti =

Coordinates: 48°05′N 22°21′E

- Interactive map of Olcsvaapáti
- Country: Hungary
- County: Szabolcs-Szatmár-Bereg

Area
  - Total: 11.00 km^{2} (4.25 sq mi)

Population (2011)
  - Total: 293
  - Density: 26.6/km^{2} (69/sq mi)
- Time zone: UTC+1 (CET)
  - Summer (DST): UTC+2 (CEST)
- Postal code: 4914
- Area code: 44

Location of Szabolcs-Szatmar-Bereg county in Hungary

Olcsvaapáti is a village in Szabolcs-Szatmár-Bereg county, in the Northern Great Plain region of eastern Hungary.

== Geography ==
It covers an area of 11.00 km^{2} (4 sq mi) and has a population of 293 people (2011).
