= Mátyus =

Coordinates: 48°17′N 22°17′E

- Interactive map of Mátyus
- Country: Hungary
- County: Szabolcs-Szatmár-Bereg

Area
  - Total: 11.03 km^{2} (4.26 sq mi)

Population (2015)
  - Total: 266
  - Density: 24.1/km^{2} (62/sq mi)
- Time zone: UTC+1 (CET)
  - Summer (DST): UTC+2 (CEST)
- Postal code: 4835
- Area code: 45

Location of Szabolcs-Szatmar-Bereg county in Hungary

Mátyus is a village in Szabolcs-Szatmár-Bereg county, in the Northern Great Plain region of eastern Hungary.

Jews lived in Mátyus for many years until they were murdered in the Holocaust

== Geography ==
It covers an area of 11.03 km^{2} (4 sq mi) and has a population of 266 people (2015).
