= Olcsva =

Coordinates: 48°05′N 22°20′E

- Interactive map of Olcsva
- Country: Hungary
- County: Szabolcs-Szatmár-Bereg

Area
  - Total: 9.96 km^{2} (3.85 sq mi)

Population (2015)
  - Total: 695
  - Density: 69.8/km^{2} (181/sq mi)
- Time zone: UTC+1 (CET)
  - Summer (DST): UTC+2 (CEST)
- Postal code: 4826
- Area code: 45

Location of Szabolcs-Szatmar-Bereg county in Hungary

Olcsva is a village in Szabolcs-Szatmár-Bereg county, in the Northern Great Plain region of eastern Hungary.

Jews lived in Olcsva for many years until they were murdered in the Holocaust. Apparently there was a Jewish cemetery in the village.

== Geography ==
It covers an area of 9.96 km^{2} (4 sq mi) and has a population of 695 people (2015).
