= Darnó =

Coordinates: 47°57′34″N 22°39′28″E

- Interactive map of Darnó
- Country: Hungary
- County: Szabolcs-Szatmár-Bereg

Area
  - Total: 4.64 km^{2} (1.79 sq mi)

Population (2001)
  - Total: 160
  - Density: 34.48/km^{2} (89.3/sq mi)
- Time zone: UTC+1 (CET)
  - Summer (DST): UTC+2 (CEST)
- Postal code: 4737
- Area code: 44

Location of Szabolcs-Szatmar-Bereg county in Hungary

Darnó is a village in Szabolcs-Szatmár-Bereg county, in the Northern Great Plain region of eastern Hungary.

== Geography ==
It covers an area of 34.48 km^{2} (13 sq mi) and has a population of 160 people (2001).
