= Jánkmajtis =

Coordinates: 47°57′N 22°39′E

- Village
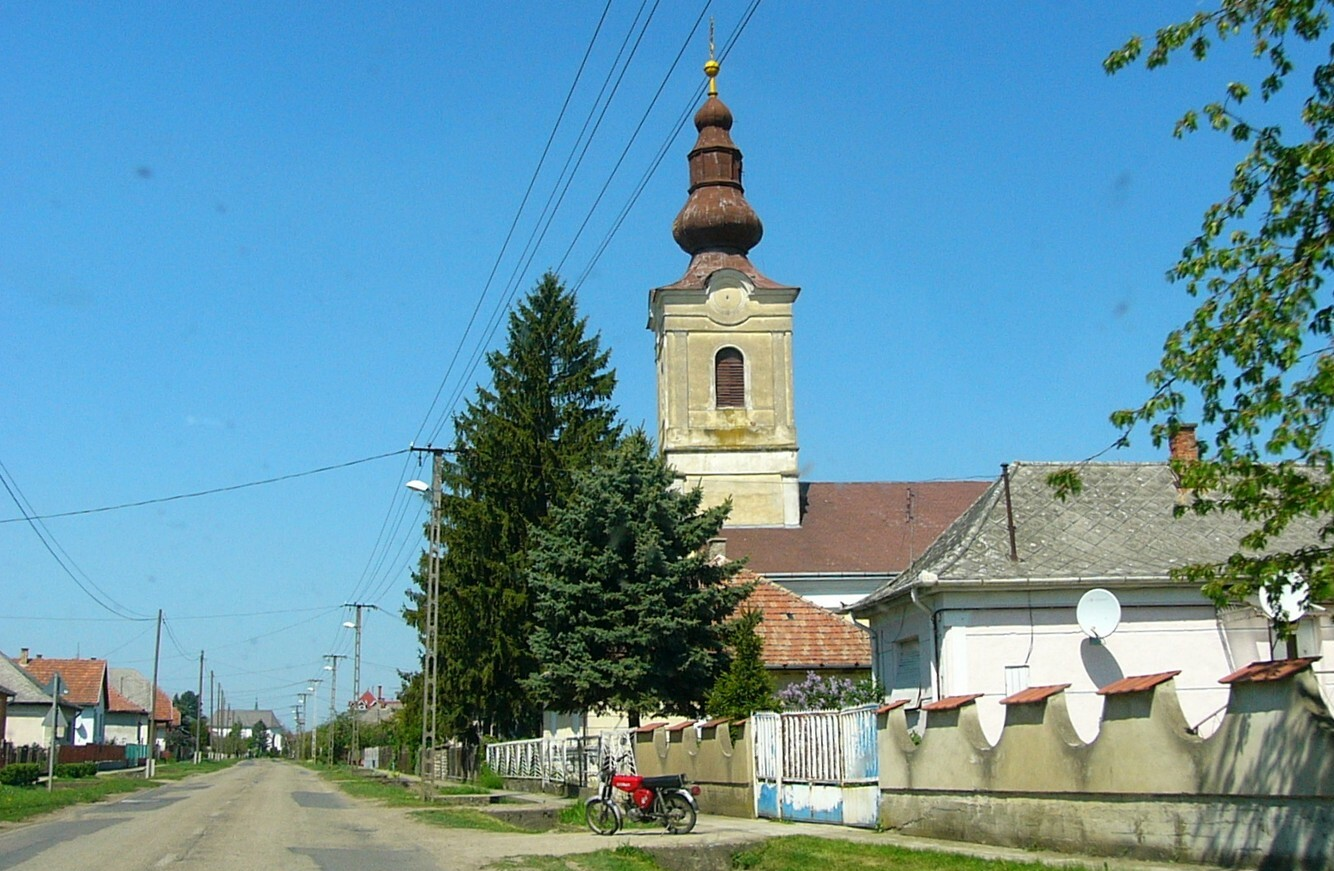
- Greek Catholic Church in Jánkmajtis
- Interactive map of Jánkmajtis
- Country: Hungary
- County: Szabolcs-Szatmár-Bereg

Area
  - Total: 25.03 km^{2} (9.66 sq mi)

Population (2015)
  - Total: 1,736
  - Density: 69.2/km^{2} (179/sq mi)
- Time zone: UTC+1 (CET)
  - Summer (DST): UTC+2 (CEST)
- Postal code: 4741
- Area code: 44

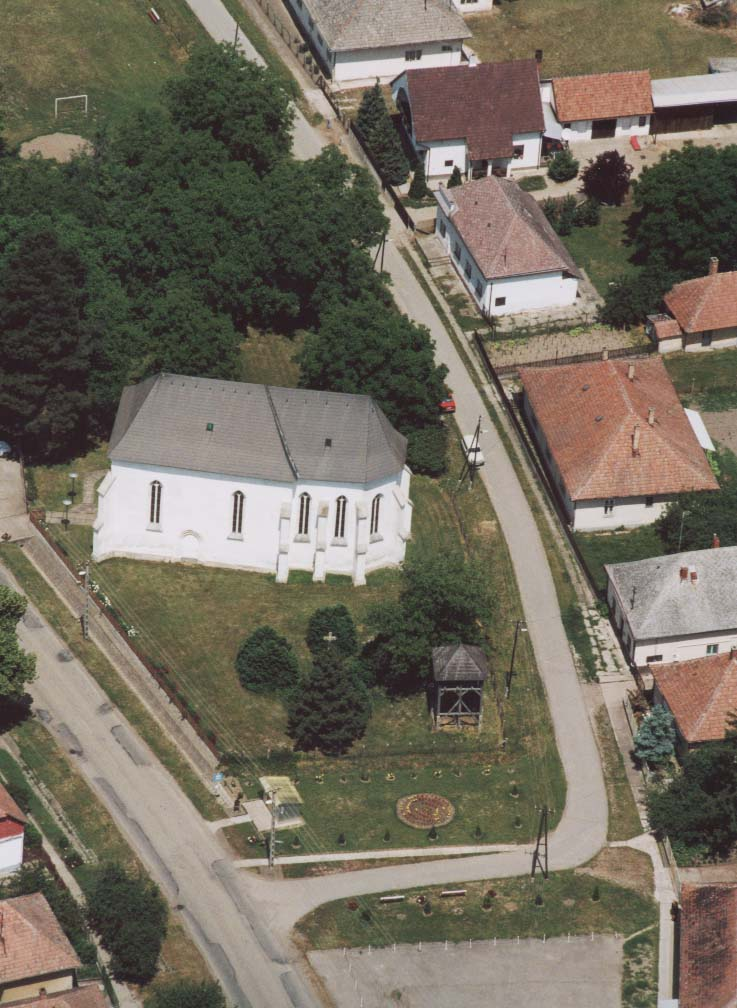
Aerial photo of a church in Jánkmajtis

Jánkmajtis is a village in Szabolcs-Szatmár-Bereg county, in the Northern Great Plain region of eastern Hungary.

== Geography ==
Jánkmajtis covers an area of 25.03 km^{2} (10 sq mi) and has a population of 1736 people (2015).

== History ==
The village first appears in writing in 1252. In the early 1300s, the village belonged to the Jánky family, and in 1315, the village passed into the control of the Borsa clan. In 1316, Charles I of Hungary confiscated the Borsa clan's lands due to disloyalty, and gifted the village to Tamás Beregi.

== Demographics ==
As of 2023, the village had a total population of 1668. As of 2022, the town was 88.6% Hungarian, and 15.9% Gypsy. The population was 47.0% Reformed, 13.6% Greek Catholic, and 10.7% Roman Catholic.
