= Császló =

Coordinates: 47°55′N 22°44′E

- Interactive map of Császló
- Country: Hungary
- County: Szabolcs-Szatmár-Bereg

Area
  - Total: 10.18 km^{2} (3.93 sq mi)

Population (2013)
  - Total: 346
  - Density: 34/km^{2} (88/sq mi)
- Time zone: UTC+1 (CET)
  - Summer (DST): UTC+2 (CEST)
- Postal code: 4973
- Area code: 44

Location of Szabolcs-Szatmar-Bereg county in Hungary

Császló is a village in Szabolcs-Szatmár-Bereg county, in the Northern Great Plain region of eastern Hungary.

== Etymology ==
The name comes from Slavic personal name Čáslav (see also Čáslav, Czech Republic).

== Geography ==
It covers an area of 10.18 km^{2} (4 sq mi) and has a population of 346 people (2013 estimate).

== Population ==
| Year | 1980 | 1990 | 2001 | 2010 | 2011 | 2013 |
| Population | 432 (census) | 385 (census) | 383 (census) | 380 (estimate) | 340 (census) | 346 (estimate) |
