= Garbolc =

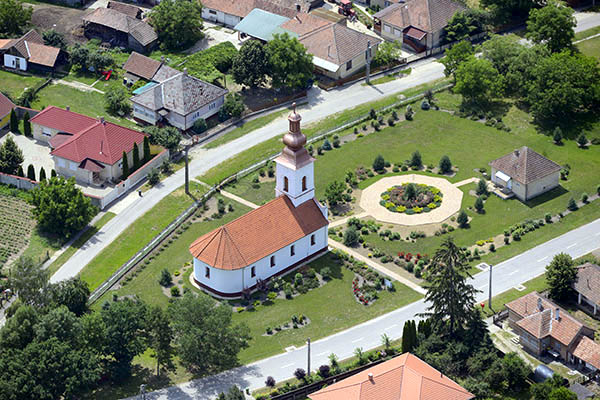

- Location of Garbolc in Hungary
- Coordinates: 47.94517°N 22.85993°E
- Country: Hungary
- Region: Northern Great Plain
- County: Szabolcs-Szatmár-Bereg
- Subregion: Fehérgyarmati
- Rank: Village

Area
  - Total: 7.26 km^{2} (2.80 sq mi)

Population (1 January 2008)
  - Total: 148
  - Density: 20.4/km^{2} (52.8/sq mi)
- Time zone: UTC+1 (CET)
  - Summer (DST): UTC+2 (CEST)
- Postal code: 4976
- Area code: +36 44
- KSH code: 04996
- Website: https://garbolc.asp.lgov.hu/

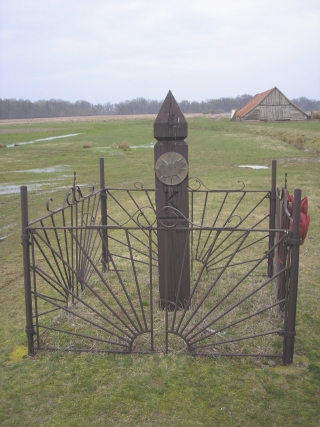
Easternmost point of Hungary marker, located 1 km away from the border.

Garbolc is a village in Szabolcs-Szatmár-Bereg county, Hungary. It is located near the easternmost geographical point (the Romanian-Ukrainian-Hungarian tripoint) of Hungary.
