= Vámosoroszi =

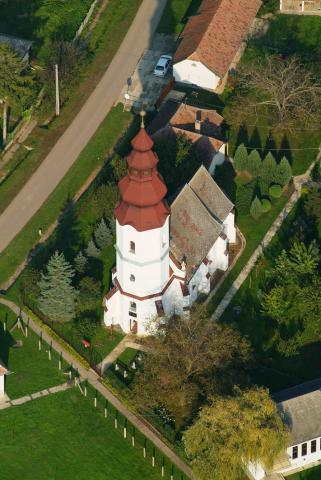
- Church from a bird's eye view

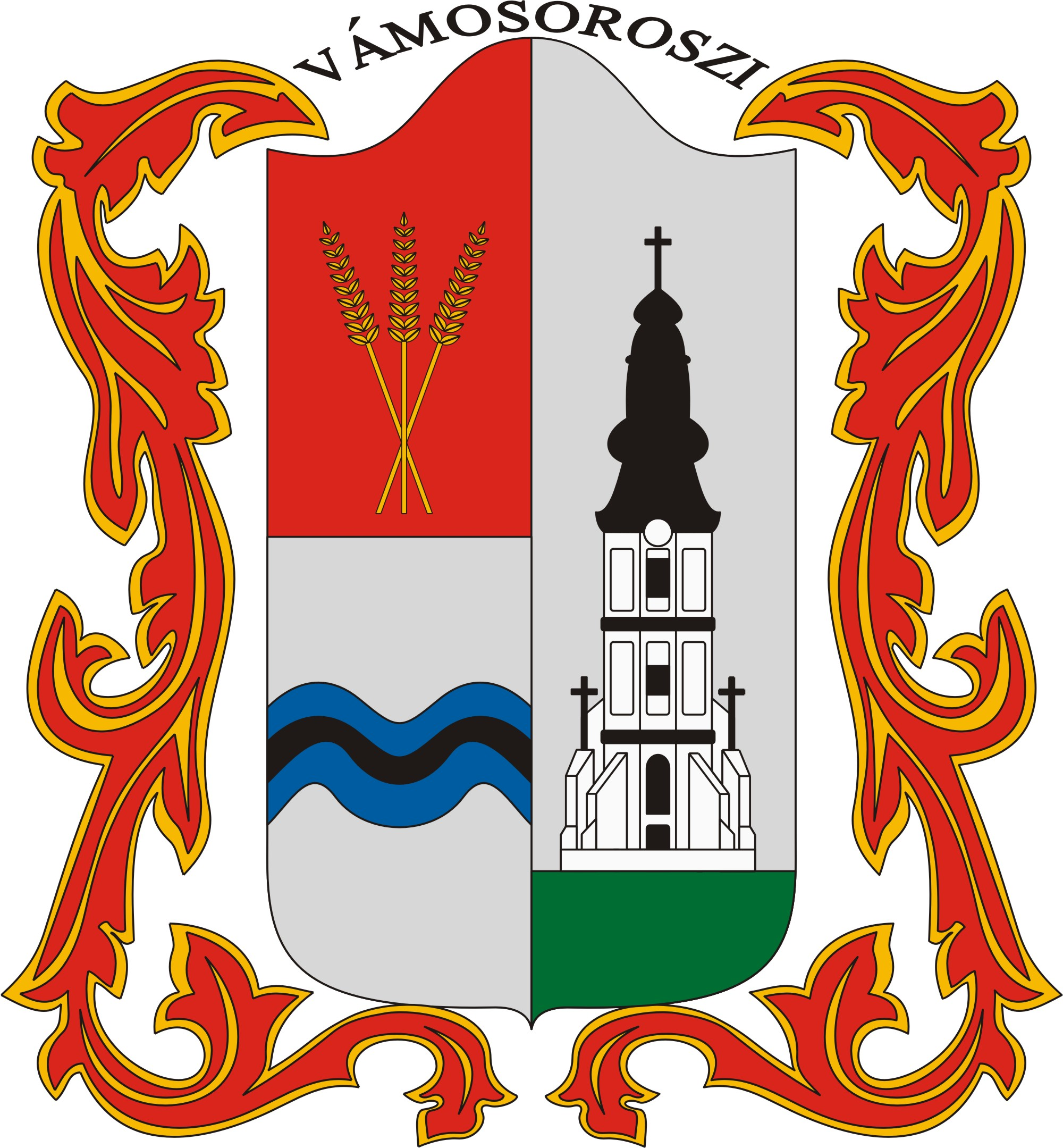
- Coat of arms

- Location of Vámosoroszi in Hungary
- Coordinates: 47.98°N 22.68°E
- Country: Hungary
- Region: Northern Great Plain
- County: Szabolcs-Szatmár-Bereg

Area
  - Total: 13.16 km^{2} (5.08 sq mi)

Population (2015)
  - Total: 517
  - Density: 39.3/km^{2} (102/sq mi)
- Time zone: UTC+1 (CET)
  - Summer (DST): UTC+2 (CEST)
- Postal code: 4966
- Area code: +36 44
- Website: http://vamosoroszi.hu/

Vámosoroszi is a village in Szabolcs-Szatmár-Bereg county, in the Northern Great Plain region of eastern Hungary. It is located in the eastern part of the county, on the Satu Mare Plain, near the Ukrainian border, and is inhabited by the Tapolnok stream.

== Geography ==
It covers an area of 13.15 km^{2} (5 sq mi) and has a population of 517 people (2015).

== History ==
The name of the settlement was first mentioned in the deeds in 1324, when its name was written in the form of Uruczy (Russian). The village was inhabited by Ukrainian (Russian) settlers and was a customs post.

In the 14th century it was owned by the Kölcsey and Matucsynai families.

In 1419, part of the village was donated by King Sigismund to István Báthori and his brother, Benedek, while the other half was given to István Jakus Kusalyi.

In 1524, János Drágffy became its judge.

In 1633 it was considered the property of István and Peter Bethlen.

From 1810 it had several owners, including the Domahidy, Tolnai, Szenichey, Mándy and Gulácsy families.

In the second half of the 17th century, the Luby, Maróthy, Fábri and Rédhey families owned the village.

During the Rákóczi War of Independence, the village was completely destroyed.

Until 1945, it was even owned by the Staudinger and Chisteph families.
