= Magosliget =

Coordinates: 48°03′N 22°52′E

- Interactive map of Magosliget
- Country: Hungary
- County: Szabolcs-Szatmár-Bereg

Area
  - Total: 5.18 km^{2} (2.00 sq mi)

Population (2015)
  - Total: 315
  - Density: 60.8/km^{2} (157/sq mi)
- Time zone: UTC+1 (CET)
  - Summer (DST): UTC+2 (CEST)
- Postal code: 4953
- Area code: 44

Location of Szabolcs-Szatmar-Bereg county in Hungary

Magosliget is a village in Szabolcs-Szatmár-Bereg county, in the Northern Great Plain region of eastern Hungary.

== Geography ==
It covers an area of 5.18 km^{2} (2 sq mi) and has a population of 315 people (2015).
