= Nagyszekeres =

Coordinates: 47°58′N 22°37′E

- Interactive map of Nagyszekeres
- Country: Hungary
- County: Szabolcs-Szatmár-Bereg

Area
  - Total: 10.52 km^{2} (4.06 sq mi)

Population (2015)
  - Total: 550
  - Density: 52.3/km^{2} (135/sq mi)
- Time zone: UTC+1 (CET)
  - Summer (DST): UTC+2 (CEST)
- Postal code: 4962
- Area code: 44

Location of Szabolcs-Szatmar-Bereg county in Hungary

Nagyszekeres is a village in Szabolcs-Szatmár-Bereg county, in the Northern Great Plain region of eastern Hungary.

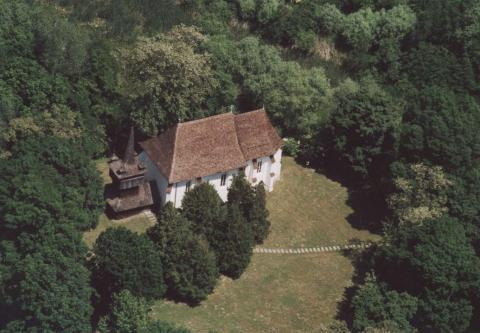
Aerial photography of a bell and temple in Nagyszekeres

== Geography ==
It covers an area of 10.52 km^{2} (4 sq mi) and has a population of 550 people (2015).
