= Csaholc =

- Location within Hungary
- Coordinates: 47°59′N 22°44′E
- Country: Hungary
- County: Szabolcs-Szatmár-Bereg

Area
  - Total: 19.35 km^{2} (7.47 sq mi)

Population (2015)
  - Total: 559
  - Density: 28.9/km^{2} (75/sq mi)
- Time zone: UTC+1 (CET)
  - Summer (DST): UTC+2 (CEST)
- Postal code: 4967
- Area code: 44
- Website: csaholc.hu

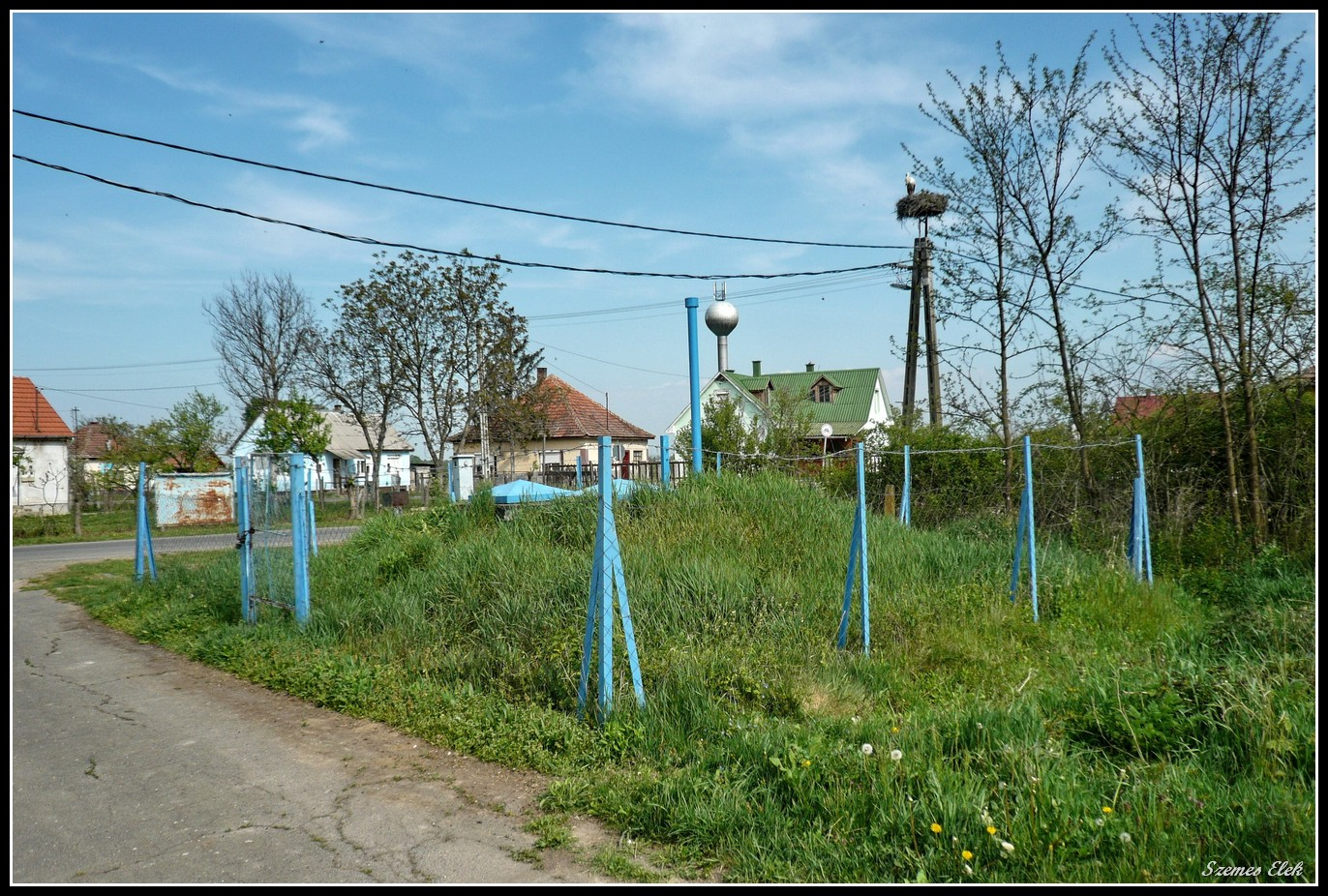
Image of Csaholc, Hungary

Csaholc is a village in Szabolcs-Szatmár-Bereg county, in the Northern Great Plain region of eastern Hungary.

== Geography ==
It covers an area of 27.24 km^{2} (11 sq mi) and has a population of 559 people (2015).
