= Nagyar =

Coordinates: 48°03′N 22°34′E

- Interactive map of Nagyar
- Country: Hungary
- County: Szabolcs-Szatmár-Bereg

Area
  - Total: 15.99 km^{2} (6.17 sq mi)

Population (2015)
  - Total: 677
  - Density: 42.3/km^{2} (110/sq mi)
- Time zone: UTC+1 (CET)
  - Summer (DST): UTC+2 (CEST)
- Postal code: 4922
- Area code: 36

Location of Szabolcs-Szatmar-Bereg county in Hungary

Nagyar is a village in Szabolcs-Szatmár-Bereg county, in the Northern Great Plain region of eastern Hungary.

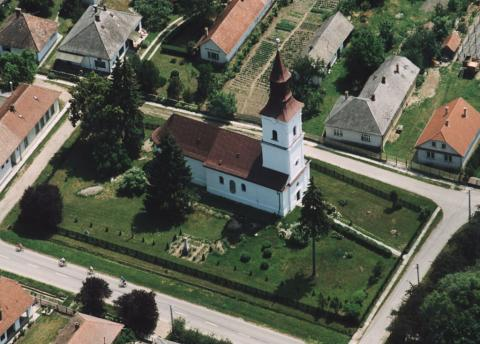
Aerial photography of Nagyar

A lot of noted people have been born here.

== Geography ==
It covers an area of 15.99 km^{2} (6 sq mi) and has a population of 630 people (2020).
