= Kispalád =

Coordinates: 48°01′N 22°50′E

- Interactive map of Kispalád
- Country: Hungary
- County: Szabolcs-Szatmár-Bereg

Area
  - Total: 16.73 km^{2} (6.46 sq mi)

Population (2015)
  - Total: 963
  - Density: 57.6/km^{2} (149/sq mi)
- Time zone: UTC+1 (CET)
  - Summer (DST): UTC+2 (CEST)
- Postal code: 4956
- Area code: 44

Location of Szabolcs-Szatmar-Bereg county in Hungary

Kispalád is a village in Szabolcs-Szatmár-Bereg county, in the Northern Great Plain region of eastern Hungary.

== Geography ==
It covers an area of 16.73 km^{2} (6 sq mi) and has a population of 963 people (2015).
