= Nábrád =

Coordinates: 48°00′N 22°27′E

- Interactive map of Nábrád
- Country: Hungary
- County: Szabolcs-Szatmár-Bereg

Area
  - Total: 17.69 km^{2} (6.83 sq mi)

Population (2001)
  - Total: 958
  - Density: 54.15/km^{2} (140.2/sq mi)
- Time zone: UTC+1 (CET)
  - Summer (DST): UTC+2 (CEST)
- Postal code: 4911
- Area code: 44

Location of Szabolcs-Szatmar-Bereg county in Hungary

Nábrád is a village in Szabolcs-Szatmár-Bereg county, in the Northern Great Plain region of eastern Hungary.

== Geography ==
It covers an area of 17.69 km^{2} (7 sq mi) and has a population of 958 people (2001).
