= Penyige =

Coordinates: 47°59′N 22°34′E

- Interactive map of Penyige
- Country: Hungary
- County: Szabolcs-Szatmár-Bereg

Area
  - Total: 18.89 km^{2} (7.29 sq mi)

Population (2001)
  - Total: 768
  - Density: 40.66/km^{2} (105.3/sq mi)
- Time zone: UTC+1 (CET)
  - Summer (DST): UTC+2 (CEST)
- Postal code: 4941
- Area code: 44

Location of Szabolcs-Szatmar-Bereg county in Hungary

Penyige is a village in Szabolcs-Szatmár-Bereg county, in the Northern Great Plain region of eastern Hungary.

== Buildings and structures ==
- 217-metre-tall guyed TV and Radio mast
- 102.8 MHz – Retro Rádió
- 105.9 MHz – Kossuth Rádió

== Geography ==
It covers an area of 18.89 km^{2} (7 sq mi) and has a population of 768 people (2001).

== Culture ==
The village Penyige, with a long history (first mention in documents of the 12th century), is remotely situated near the Ukrainian border with Hungary, has a strong feeling of community belonging and a rich community life today. A perfect example is the retired village teacher who has been a source of creativity as to the preservation of the past. Thanks to her, a village museum was established, where old gadgets, documents, folklore, products and reminiscences of old times are exhibited.

Efforts are made to preserve tradition and in order to strengthen the bonds among local people, also outside the village, a market is organised yearly (in August) at the banks of the river Szenke. The event is named after the flood and is known as the Szenke Shore Market, offering a several-day-long entertainment for the attendees. A fair and other cultural programs are presented for people to enjoy an abundance of local specialities, such as food and folklore traditions.

The river Szenke has been dominating the village's history and life for centuries, supplying people with fish. A tragic boat accident on the river at the beginning of the 20th century laid the ground to the creation of what could be called the last productive ballade in Hungary. It is still under steady creation as it inspires people to add new melodies to it, to change its text and spread it in the country.

The speciality of the place, the 'plum jam from Penyige' with a very distinct flavour, is well known in Hungary. The special flavour is owing to the production technology: i.e. without adding sugar and cooking it without interruption for a long time (almost 24 hours). This assures that the jam has a rich and a very special flavour and it is also long lasting, without additional preservatives.

Pre-WW2 the village had a notably large Jewish community dated back to the 19th century, today there still exists a Jewish cemetery nearby the village containing 10 old tombstones. The Jewish community was of the Fehérgyarmat community, whose number has been up to 850 before WW2, afterwards only 84 recorded survivors of the community were found.

During WW2 most of the Jewish locals were executed along the rest of the Jews in the area.
