= Kölcse =

Coordinates: 48°03′N 22°43′E

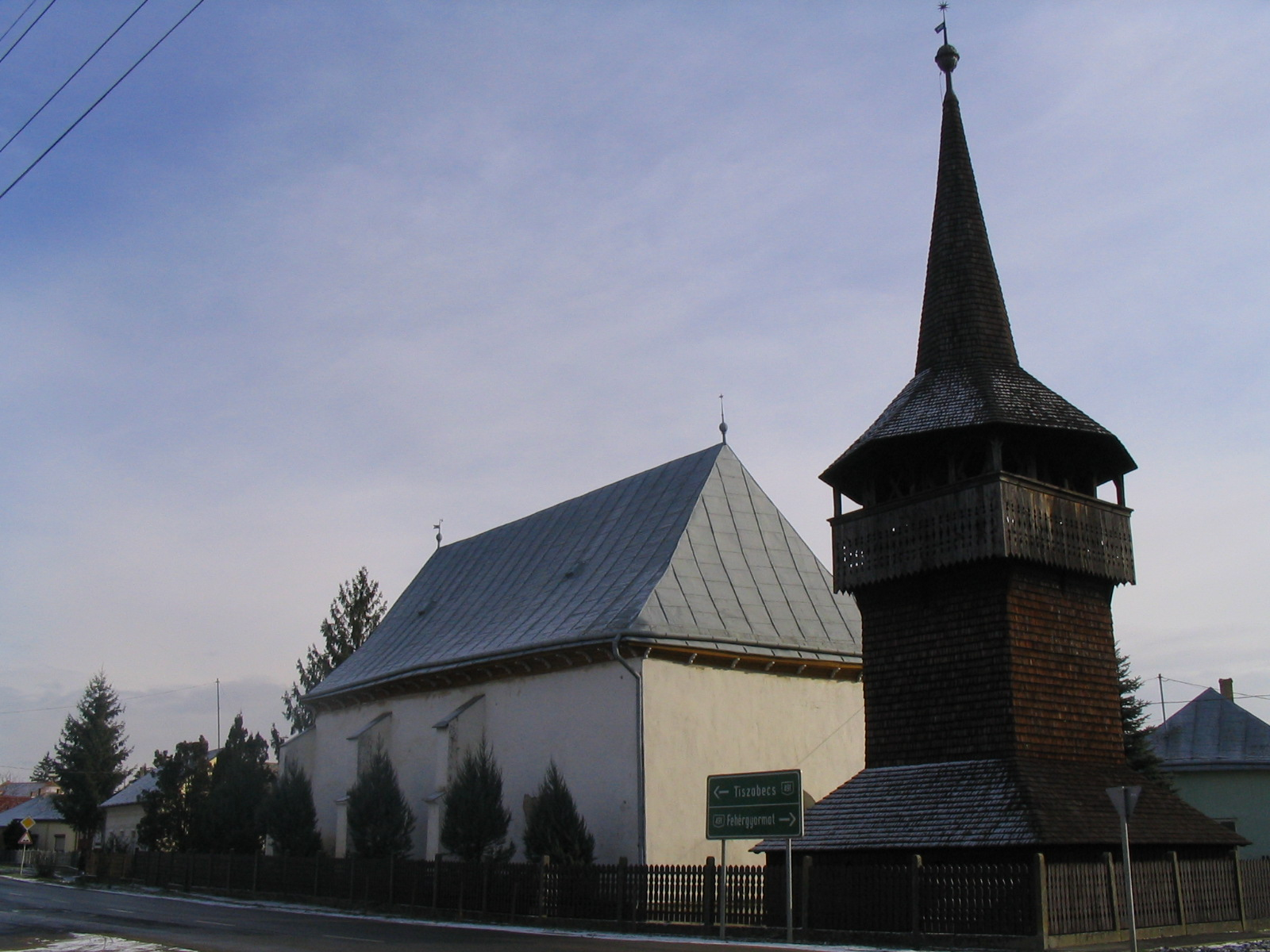
- The wooden bell tower of Kölcse

- Coat of arms
- Interactive map of Kölcse
- Country: Hungary
- County: Szabolcs-Szatmár-Bereg

Area
  - Total: 28.26 km^{2} (10.91 sq mi)

Population (2015)
  - Total: 1,411
  - Density: 50/km^{2} (130/sq mi)
- Time zone: UTC+1 (CET)
  - Summer (DST): UTC+2 (CEST)
- Postal code: 4965
- Area code: 44

Location of Szabolcs-Szatmar-Bereg county in Hungary

Kölcse is a village in Szabolcs-Szatmár-Bereg county, in the Northern Great Plain region of eastern Hungary.

== Geography ==
It covers an area of 28.26 km^{2} (11 sq mi) and has a population of 1411 people (2015).
