= Nemesborzova =

Coordinates: 47°59′N 22°38′E

- Interactive map of Nemesborzova
- Country: Hungary
- County: Szabolcs-Szatmár-Bereg

Area
  - Total: 2.2 km^{2} (0.85 sq mi)

Population (2015)
  - Total: 106
  - Density: 48/km^{2} (120/sq mi)
- Time zone: UTC+1 (CET)
  - Summer (DST): UTC+2 (CEST)
- Postal code: 4942
- Area code: 44

Location of Szabolcs-Szatmar-Bereg county in Hungary

Nemesborzova is a village in Szabolcs-Szatmár-Bereg county, in the Northern Great Plain region of eastern Hungary.

== Geography ==
It covers an area of 2.2 km^{2} (1 sq mi) and has a population of 106 people (2015).
