= Zajta =

Village in eastern Hungary

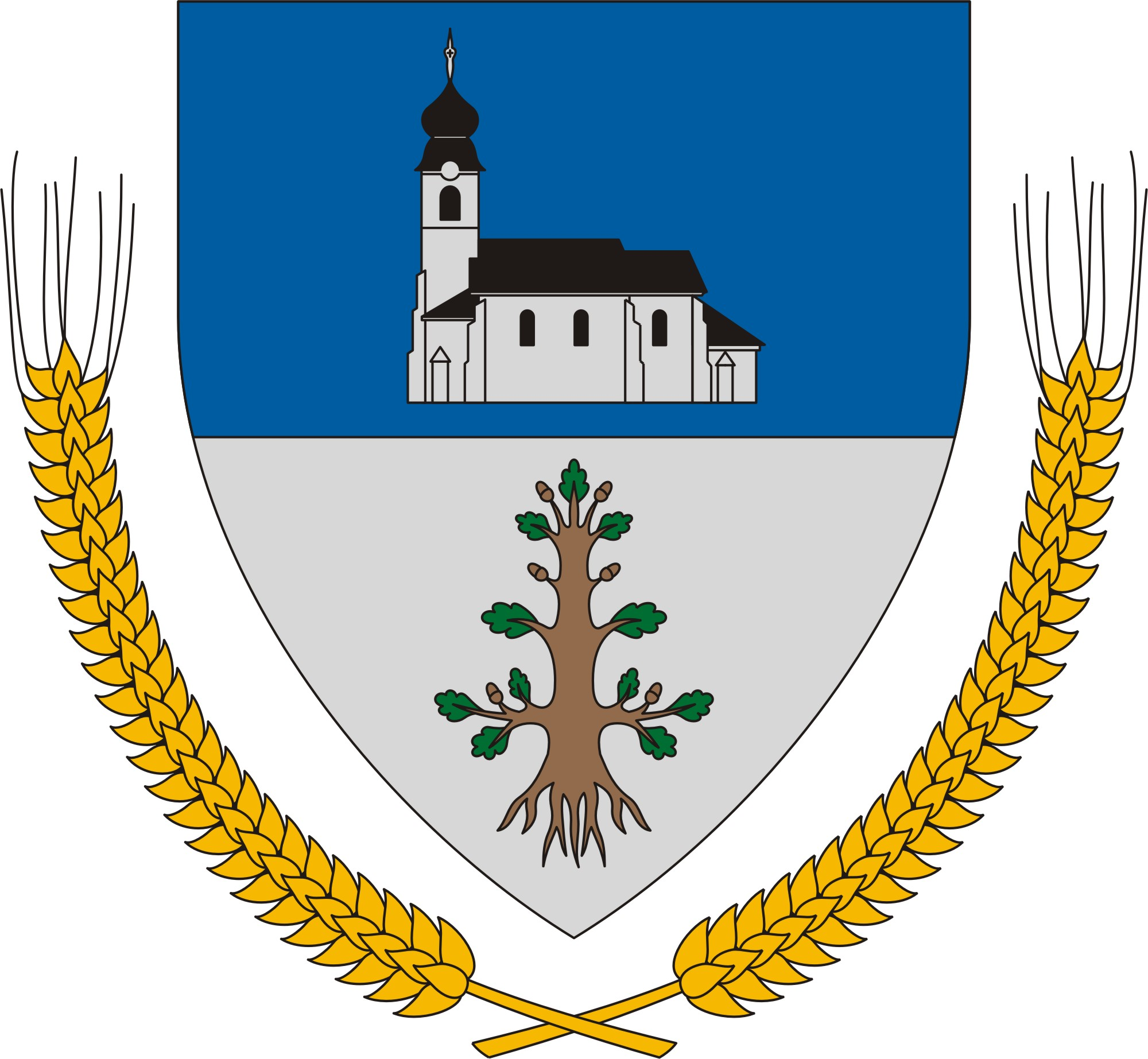
- Coat of arms

- Location of Zajta in Hungary
- Coordinates: 47.9°N 22.8°E
- Country: Hungary
- Region: Northern Great Plain
- County: Szabolcs-Szatmár-Bereg

Area
  - Total: 9.19 km^{2} (3.55 sq mi)

Population (2017)
  - Total: 441
  - Density: 48.0/km^{2} (124/sq mi)
- Time zone: UTC+1 (CET)
  - Summer (DST): UTC+2 (CEST)
- Postal code: 4974
- Area code: +36 44
- Website: https://zajta.hu/

Zajta (Romanian: Zaita) is a village in Szabolcs-Szatmár-Bereg County, Hungary.

== History ==
It was first mentioned as Zalyta in 1314 as a settlement belonging to the Gutkeled family. In 1314, Master Michael, the son of Tiba, a member of the Gutkeled family, shared their inherited estates with László, János and Tamás, brothers of the ancestor of the Apagyi family. Then Zajta got to Tamás.

His name was written as Zaytha in 1461, and his possessions were then owned by the Beck and Father families.

In 1462, András Atyai's son died without a descendant, his estate was given to the Rozsályi Kúnok, who also bought the estates of the Gacsályi family in 1476, and from then on he belonged to the Rozsályi estate and shared his fate throughout.

It was destroyed in 1671 by imperial troops and Karl von Strassaldo, the chief captain of Satu Mare, and its inhabitants fled and until 1767 its territory was uninhabited.

Following the signal of the Treaty of Trianon, Zajta became part of Romania. However, Lajos Gaál, a professor native of the village, realized that the village was owned by Hungary according to the treaty. Thus, in 1924, the village was returned to Hungary.

== Geography ==
It covers an area of 9.19 km^{2} (4 sq mi) and has a population of 441 people (2017).
