= Kisnamény =

Coordinates: 47°57′N 22°42′E

- Interactive map of Kisnamény
- Country: Hungary
- County: Szabolcs-Szatmár-Bereg

Area
  - Total: 18.01 km^{2} (6.95 sq mi)

Population (2015)
  - Total: 311
  - Density: 17.3/km^{2} (45/sq mi)
- Time zone: UTC+1 (CET)
  - Summer (DST): UTC+2 (CEST)
- Postal code: 4737
- Area code: 44

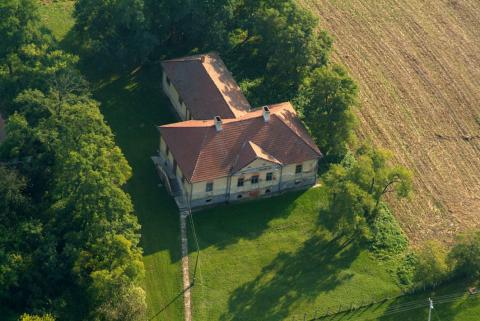

Location of Szabolcs-Szatmar-Bereg county in Hungary

Kisnamény is a village in Szabolcs-Szatmár-Bereg county, in the Northern Great Plain region of eastern Hungary.

== Geography ==
It covers an area of 18.01 km^{2} (7 sq mi) and has a population of 311 people (2015).
