= Tisztaberek =

Coordinates: 47°57′N 22°48′E

- Coat of arms
- Interactive map of Tisztaberek
- Country: Hungary
- County: Szabolcs-Szatmár-Bereg

Area
  - Total: 18.22 km^{2} (7.03 sq mi)

Population (2001)
  - Total: 665
  - Density: 36.5/km^{2} (95/sq mi)
- Time zone: UTC+1 (CET)
  - Summer (DST): UTC+2 (CEST)
- Postal code: 4969
- Area code: 44
- Website: https://www.tisztaberek.hu

Location of Szabolcs-Szatmar-Bereg county in Hungary

Tiszaberek is a village in Szabolcs-Szatmár-Bereg county, in the Northern Great Plain region of eastern Hungary.

== Geography ==
It covers an area of 18.22 km^{2} (7 sq mi) and has a population of 665 people (2001).

== History ==
The name of the settlement is first mentioned in diplomas in 1332, when it was written as Chyzaberug, in 1342 as Thyzthaberuk, in 1470 as Thyzthaberek, and in 1486 as Berek.

It was already a church place in the early 14th century.

In 1352, István, the son of Mihály Tibai, took possession of the property of his relatives, Master Peter and Tamás, for 200 gypsies.

In 1393, Balk and Drágh sued the sons of the Meggyes ban over Tisztaberek.

In 1424 and 1470 it is shared by the Precious. In addition to the Darling, the Gachály family also owned it,

In 1437 and 1470 the Csató family also owned it.

In the 15th century, the settlement also had a Pauline monastery, the patrons of which were members of the Drágfi family.

Tisztaberek already belonged to the castle of Satu Mare in 1486.

At the beginning of the 18th century, it belonged to the Gyulafi family, then after it became the property of Gergely Tarpay, who II. He followed Ferenc Rákóczi to the hiding place, when the Rhédeys got it, but the Kecskés and Vasadi families also had property here.

At the beginning of the 1900s, Sándor Szoboszlay, Imre Dely and Zsigmond Fogarassy also have larger estates in the settlement.
