= Nagyhódos =

Coordinates: 47°58′N 22°51′E

- Interactive map of Nagyhódos
- Country: Hungary
- County: Szabolcs-Szatmár-Bereg

Area
  - Total: 7.65 km^{2} (2.95 sq mi)

Population (2015)
  - Total: 117
  - Density: 15.3/km^{2} (40/sq mi)
- Time zone: UTC+1 (CET)
  - Summer (DST): UTC+2 (CEST)
- Postal code: 4977
- Area code: 44

Location of Szabolcs-Szatmar-Bereg county in Hungary

Nagyhódos is a small village in Szabolcs-Szatmár-Bereg county, in the Northern Great Plain region of eastern Hungary.

== Geography ==
It covers an area of 7.65 km^{2} (3 sq mi) and has a population of 117 people (2015).
