= Gyügye =

Coordinates: 47°56′N 22°34′E

- Interactive map of Gyügye
- Country: Hungary
- County: Szabolcs-Szatmár-Bereg

Area
  - Total: 4.33 km^{2} (1.67 sq mi)

Population (2001)
  - Total: 271
  - Density: 62.59/km^{2} (162.1/sq mi)
- Time zone: UTC+1 (CET)
  - Summer (DST): UTC+2 (CEST)
- Postal code: 4733
- Area code: 44

Location of Szabolcs-Szatmar-Bereg county in Hungary

Gyügye is a village in Szabolcs-Szatmár-Bereg county, in the Northern Great Plain region of eastern Hungary.

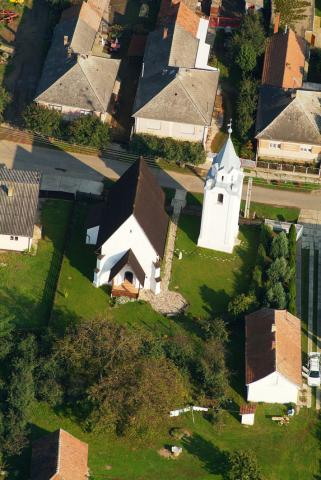
Aerial photography of a church in Gyügye

== Geography ==
It covers an area of 4.33 km^{2} (2 sq mi) and has a population of 271 people (2001).

== Landmarks ==
The old reformed church has a renowned coffered ceiling decorated in the church's inner space. The church was built in the 13th century in the romanesque style.
