= Mánd =

Coordinates: 48°00′N 22°37′E

- Interactive map of Mánd
- Country: Hungary
- County: Szabolcs-Szatmár-Bereg

Area
  - Total: 5.17 km^{2} (2.00 sq mi)

Population (2015)
  - Total: 276
  - Density: 53.3/km^{2} (138/sq mi)
- Time zone: UTC+1 (CET)
  - Summer (DST): UTC+2 (CEST)
- Postal code: 4942
- Area code: 44

Location of Szabolcs-Szatmar-Bereg county in Hungary

Mánd is a village in Szabolcs-Szatmár-Bereg county, in the Northern Great Plain region of eastern Hungary.

== Geography ==
It covers an area of 5.17 km^{2} (2 sq mi) and has a population of 276 people (2015).
