= Szamossályi =

Coordinates: 47°54′N 22°37′E

- Coat of arms
- Interactive map of Szamossályi
- Country: Hungary
- County: Szabolcs-Szatmár-Bereg

Area
  - Total: 11.57 km^{2} (4.47 sq mi)

Population (2015)
  - Total: 747
  - Density: 64.5/km^{2} (167/sq mi)
- Time zone: UTC+1 (CET)
  - Summer (DST): UTC+2 (CEST)
- Postal code: 4735
- Area code: 44

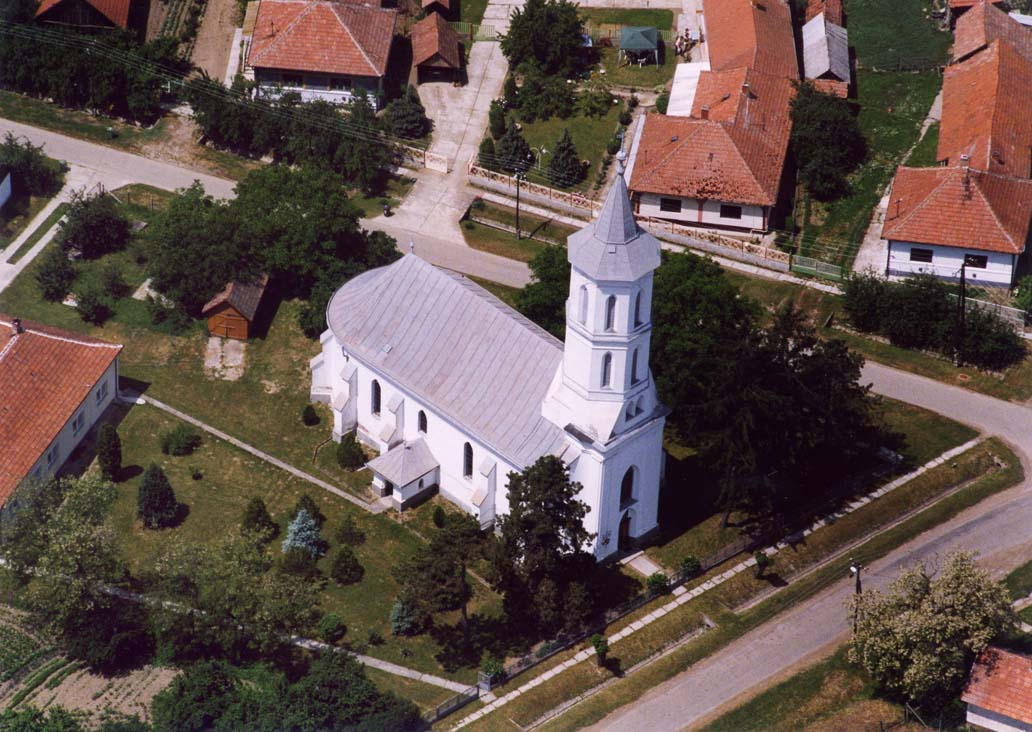
Aerial photography of Szamossályi

Location of Szabolcs-Szatmar-Bereg county in Hungary

Szamossályi is a village in Szabolcs-Szatmár-Bereg county, in the Northern Great Plain region of eastern Hungary.

== Geography ==
It covers an area of 11.57 km^{2} (4 sq mi) and has a population of 747 people (2015).
