= Sonkád =

Coordinates: 48°03′N 22°45′E

- Interactive map of Sonkád
- Country: Hungary
- County: Szabolcs-Szatmár-Bereg

Area
  - Total: 19.80 km^{2} (7.64 sq mi)

Population (2001)
  - Total: 717
  - Density: 36.21/km^{2} (93.8/sq mi)
- Time zone: UTC+1 (CET)
  - Summer (DST): UTC+2 (CEST)
- Postal code: 4954
- Area code: 44

Location of Szabolcs-Szatmar-Bereg county in Hungary

Sonkád is a village in Szabolcs-Szatmár-Bereg county, in the Northern Great Plain region of eastern Hungary.

== Geography ==
It covers an area of 19.80 km^{2} (8 sq mi) and has a population of 717 people (2001).

== Sightseeings ==
The old church built in gothic style in the 15th century can be visited. It has beautiful ceiling cassette roof.
