= Fehérgyarmat =

- Town
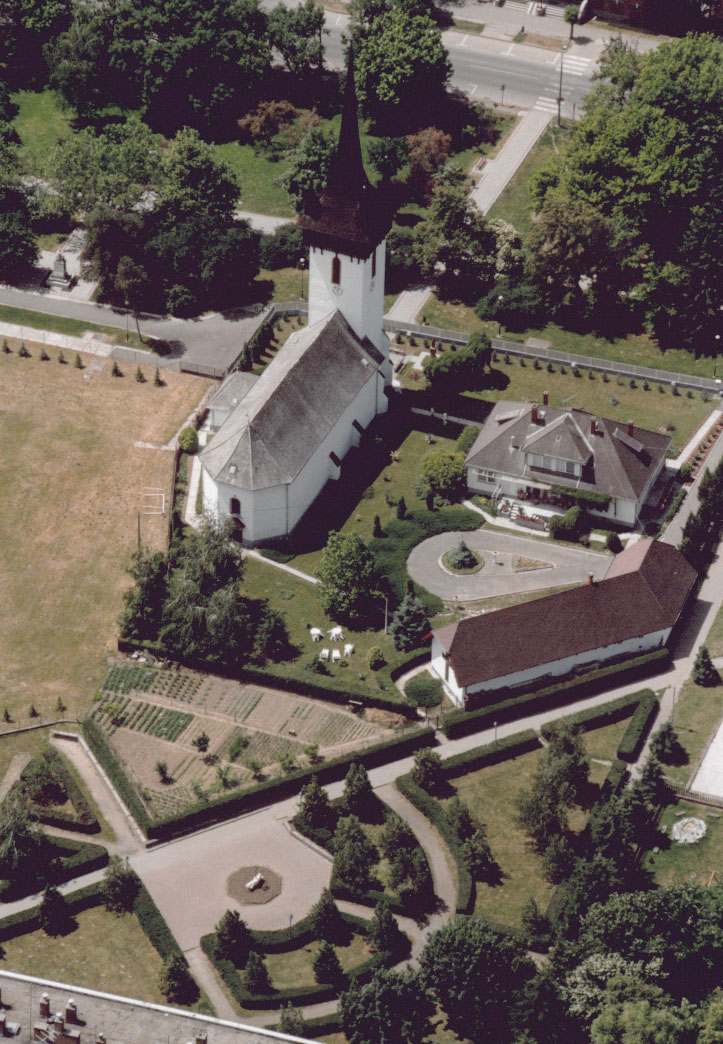
- Aerial photo: Fehérgyarmat Church

- Flag Coat of arms

- Location within Szabolcs-Szatmár-Bereg County Location within Hungary
- Coordinates: 47°59′06″N 22°31′02″E
- Country: Hungary
- County: Szabolcs-Szatmár-Bereg
- District: Fehérgyarmat

Area
  - Total: 52.46 km^{2} (20.25 sq mi)

Population (2025)
  - Total: 7,990
  - Density: 154.3/km^{2} (400/sq mi)
- Time zone: UTC+1 (CET)
  - Summer (DST): UTC+2 (CEST)
- Postal code: 4900
- Area code: (+36) 44
- Website: fehergyarmat.hu

Fehérgyarmat is a town in Szabolcs-Szatmár-Bereg county, in the Northern Great Plain region of eastern Hungary.

== Geography ==
It covers an area of 52.46 km^{2} (20 sq mi) and has a population of 8089 people (2015).

== Twin towns – sister cities ==
Fehérgyarmat is twinned with:

- Nisko, Poland
