= Tiszakóród =

Coordinates: 48°06′N 22°43′E

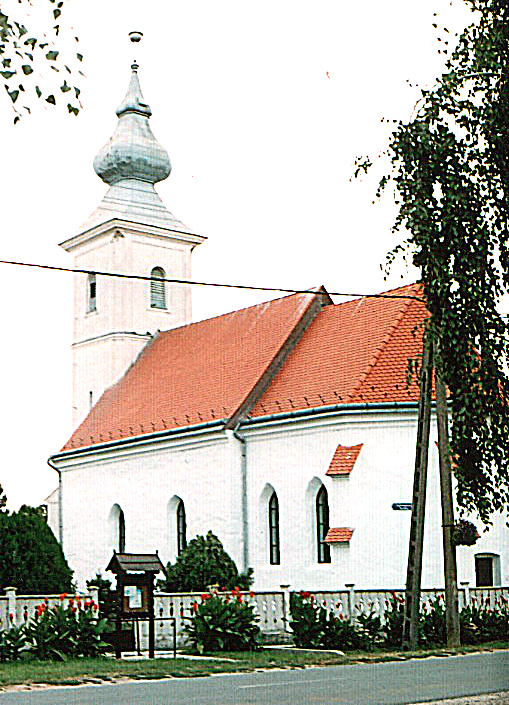
- Interactive map of Tiszakóród
- Country: Hungary
- County: Szabolcs-Szatmár-Bereg

Area
  - Total: 16.69 km^{2} (6.44 sq mi)

Population (2001)
  - Total: 819
  - Density: 49.07/km^{2} (127.1/sq mi)
- Time zone: UTC+1 (CET)
  - Summer (DST): UTC+2 (CEST)
- Postal code: 4946
- Area code: 44
- Website: http://www.tiszakorod.hu/magunkrol.html

Location of Szabolcs-Szatmar-Bereg county in Hungary

Tiszakóród is a village in Szabolcs-Szatmár-Bereg county, in the Northern Great Plain region of eastern Hungary. The town is an agricultural settlement with a total of three agricultural enterprises in the village. To the west of the village is the river Túr; more specifically, this is where the water of the Túr flows into the Tisza. One of the central features of the town is the fall dam that helps prevent flooding from the two rivers. There are walnut groves next to the dam, and both the grove and the river are a popular place for hiking and bathing in the area in summer.

== Geography ==
The village of Tiszakóród covers an area of 16.69 km^{2} (6 sq mi) and has a population of 819 people (2001).

== History ==
The settlement and its surroundings have been inhabited since ancient times, as evidenced by several prehistoric mounds on its border.

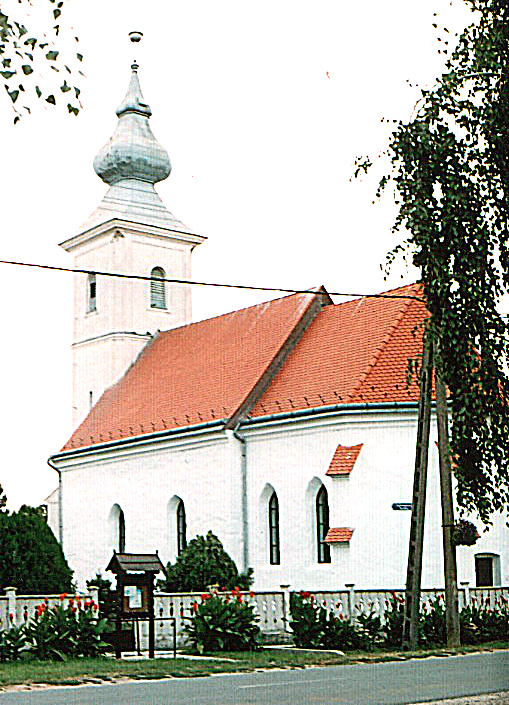
Reformed Church - Tiszakóród, Hungary

The town was first mentioned in written texts in 1334 when it went by the name of Chorod and later by Korod in 1415. The name of the village is said to have either come from the word kóró, meaning a dry plant stem or shrub, or the word góró-góré, meaning watch post. A logical reason for this naming is because it is said that Tiszakóród guarded the Tisza river crossing in 1374.

The ancient owner of the village was the Kusaly family. In the 14th century, the Kölcseyes also had property here, to which the family received a new donation in 1344. In 1488, part of their estates were sold to the people of Perény. In 1550, Kórod was acquired by the Rozsályi Kúnok and annexed to the Rozsályi estate.

When Anna László Barkóczy married Anna Rozsályi Kún, she also received the settlement with her, and then her granddaughter became the wife of Mihály Kende, and from this she became the master of the Kende family. At the beginning of the 19th century, in addition to the Kende family, the gr. Also for Rédey, Bay, Ormós, Bessenyey, Kölcsey, Tholnay, Jármi, Uketyevity, Csiszár, Sántha, Kálnási, Nyeviczkey, Uray families. At the beginning of the 20th century, its larger owner was Zsigmond Kende.

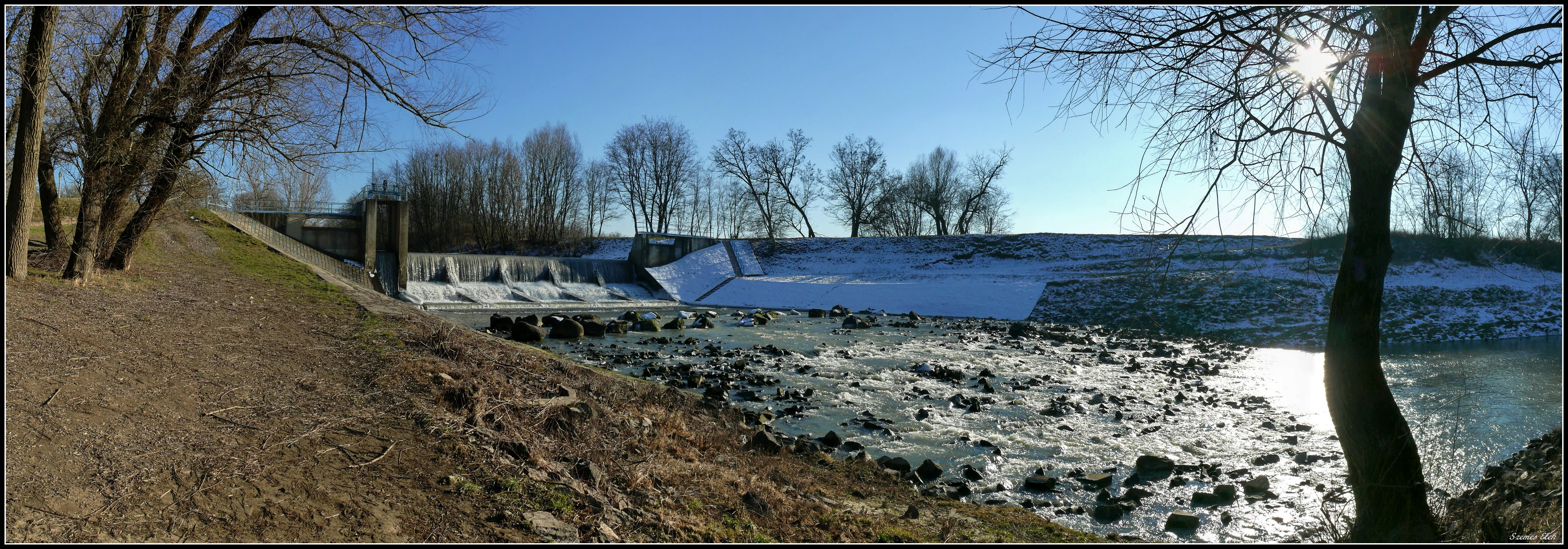
Buzzing dam in Túr river - Tiszakóród, Hungary

Fényes Elek described in his historical geography that the settlement on the banks of the Tisza, which had suffered greatly from the floods, was often washed away by the price, so he was forced to move further and further away from his original place. In the middle of the 19th century, the remains of the old village were still visible in a part called Burgundy.

=== Jewish history ===
The start of Jewish settlement is unknown in Tiszakóród. In 1880, Mátyás Márton founded a mill. From 1903, Kertész Miklós led the 500-acre estate of Kertész József. Schwartz Herman lived in the settlement from 1906, working as a mixed goods merchant, innkeeper, farmer, and municipal representative. Kaufmann Ferenc fell in World War I. From 1928, Mátyás Hermann established himself in the machinery and forging industry, then from 1937, he became a co-owner of the Mátyás Márton and Sons Roller Mill and Oil Factory with Mátyás István. Grosinger Miklós managed Zsürger László's estate from 1937. In 1941, there were 27 Jews in Tiszakóród. During the deportations they were first taken to Köles, then to Mátészalka, and from there to Auschwitz. In 1945, there were no Jews living there.

== Economy ==
Tiszakóród has been experiencing significant population decline, having lost over 500 residents since 1960. The death rate is also higher than the birth rate, and the current population is continuing to get older.

The most recent reports say that there are 319 dwellings in the town. 70% of these homes are fully equipped with water, gas, and sewage lines along with waste collection, transportation, and public lighting. 80% of dwellings have telephone access.

Tiszakóród does not have many essential services located within the town. There is a general practitioner that works in the village, but sometimes residents will opt to go to a central medical service(the nearest located 13 km away in Kölcse), or if they have children they can go to a dedicated pediatrician(the nearest office being located 30 km away in Fehérgyarmat). A hospital for those of all ages is also located in Fehérgyarmat, which is also where the ambulance service is. There are two nearby pharmacies in Kölcse and Tiszabecs, but none in the town itself. There are also no police or fire departments, the nearest of these being located in Fehérgyarmat. They do, however, have a post office of their own.

There are several small businesses in Tiszakóród, including three convenience stores, two hairdressers, a gift shop, and a guesthouse.

90% of the roads in Tiszakóród are paved.

60% of residents own their own farmland.
