= Tiszabecs =

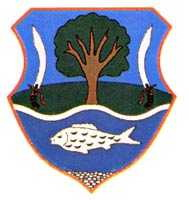
- Coat of arms

- Location within Szabolcs-Szatmár-Bereg County Location within Hungary
- Coordinates: 48°05′55.39″N 22°49′20.03″E
- Country: Hungary
- Region: Northern Great Plain
- County: Szabolcs-Szatmár-Bereg
- District: Fehérgyarmat

Area
  - Total: 17.14 km^{2} (6.62 sq mi)

Population (2015)
  - Total: 1,292
  - Density: 75.4/km^{2} (195/sq mi)
- Time zone: UTC+1 (CET)
  - Summer (DST): UTC+2 (CEST)
- Postal code: 4951
- Area code: 44
- Website: https://tiszabecs.hu

Tiszabecs is a village in Szabolcs-Szatmár-Bereg County, in the Northern Great Plain region of eastern Hungary.

It is located on the eastern edge of the county, next to the Ukrainian border, on the edge of the Satu Mare plain, on the left bank of the river Tisza. It enters the territory of Hungary on the administrative border of the Tisza (at 744.5 km).

== Geography ==
It covers an area of 17.14 km^{2} (7 sq mi) and has a population of 1292 people (2015).

== History ==
In the name of Tiszabecs, the member Becs is of personal origin, to which the name of the river is attached as a distinctive sign. The name of the village appears in 1181 during the border crossing of the estates of the company monastery. It is referred to as a castrum in 1364, suggesting the existence of a royal castle. Because it was located in an important place, the rulers insisted on it for a long time, so it was not donated to the Becsky family until 1368. The inhabitants of the village were Hungarians in the Middle Ages.

The village suffered a lot from the ordeals of the war. As the first event of Rákóczi's Transylvanian campaign, on 14 July 1703, his armies crossed the Tisza.

It appears on the first military topographic map as Tisza Becse.

In 1864, a flood destroyed much of the village. At the time, the Tisza Becse was named after the maps of the second military survey.

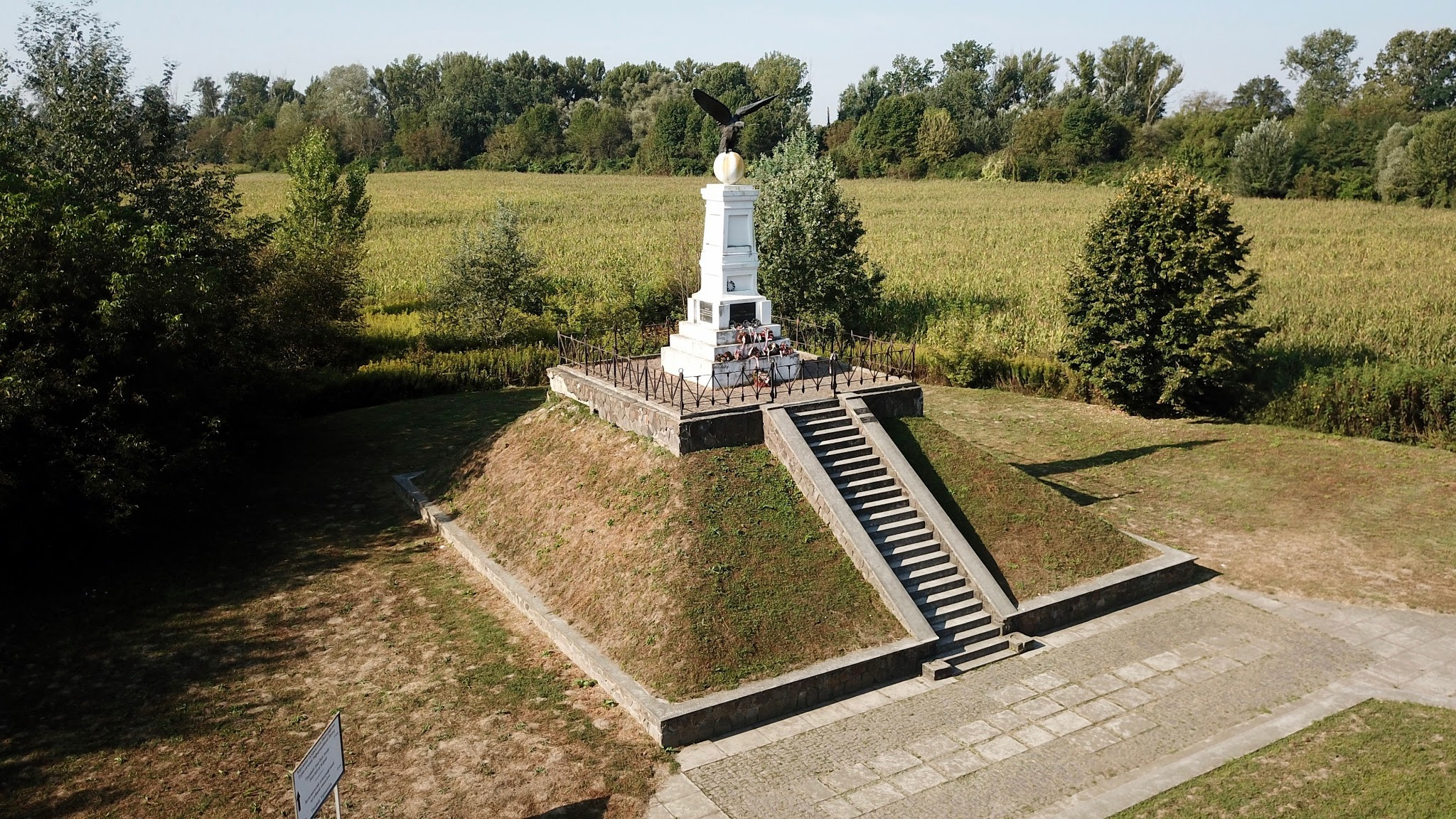
Turul Monument in Vylok, Ukraine

== Economy ==
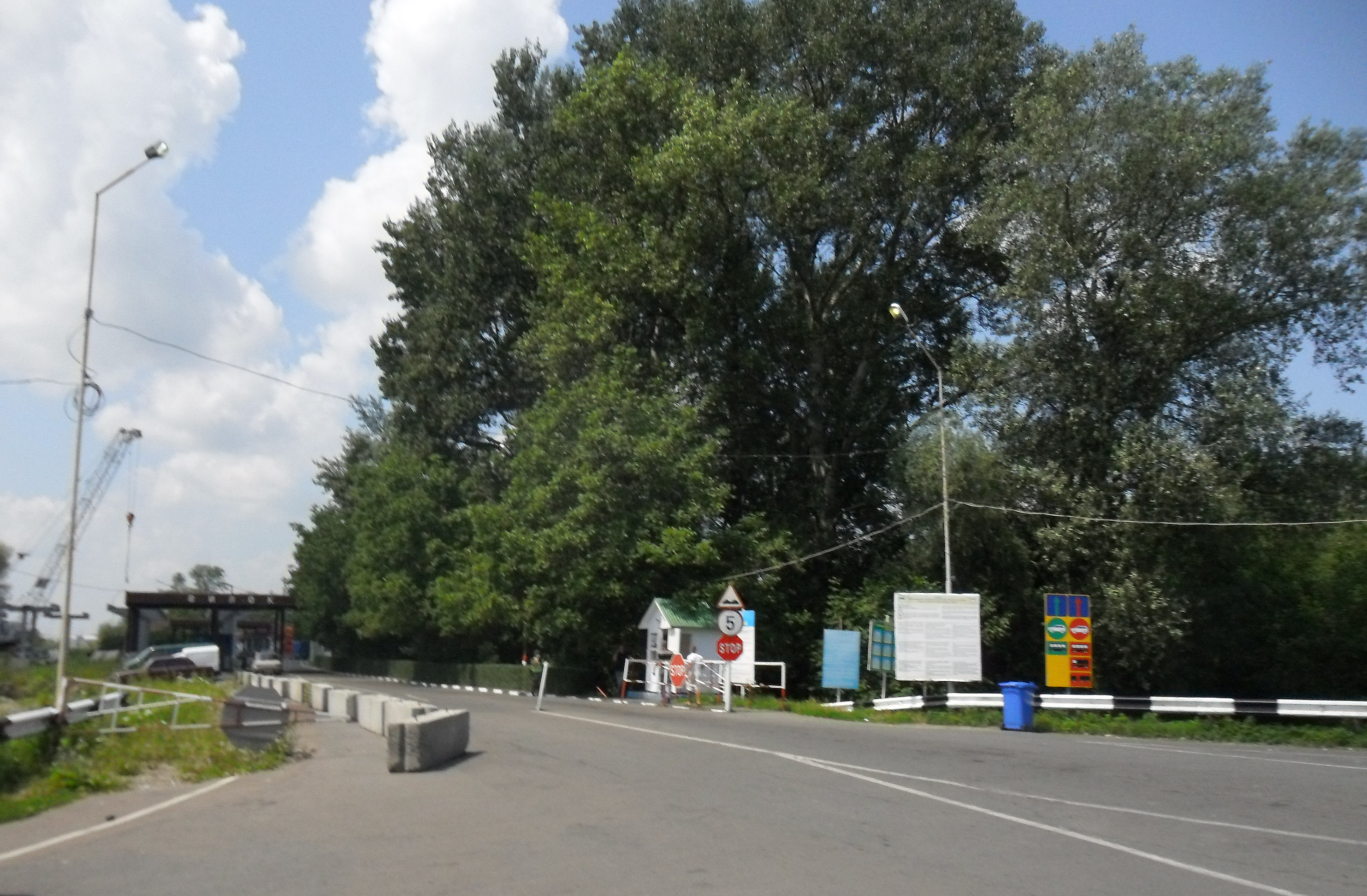
Tiszaújlak - Tiszabecs border crossing
