= Szamosújlak =

Coordinates: 47°55′N 22°36′E

- Interactive map of Szamosújlak
- Country: Hungary
- County: Szabolcs-Szatmár-Bereg

Area
  - Total: 5.27 km^{2} (2.03 sq mi)

Population (2015)
  - Total: 361
  - Density: 68.5/km^{2} (177/sq mi)
- Time zone: UTC+1 (CET)
  - Summer (DST): UTC+2 (CEST)
- Postal code: 4734
- Area code: 44

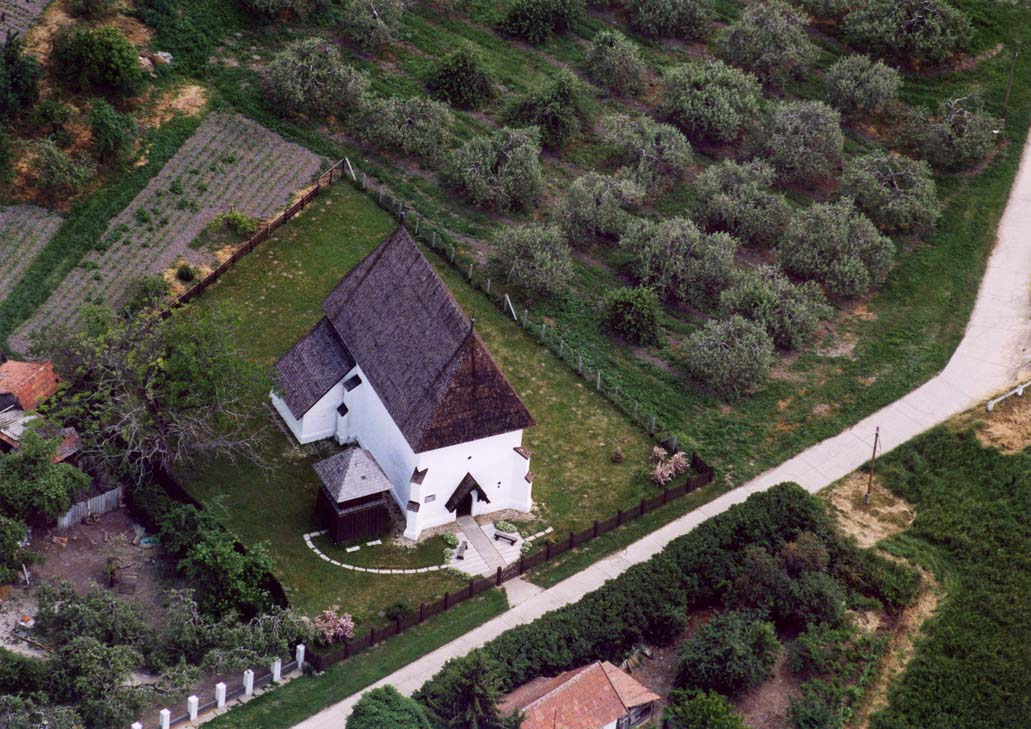
Szamosújlak, church from a bird's eye view

Location of Szabolcs-Szatmar-Bereg county in Hungary

Szamosújlak is a village in Szabolcs-Szatmár-Bereg county, in the Northern Great Plain region of eastern Hungary.

== Geography ==
It covers an area of 5.27 km^{2} (2 sq mi) and has a population of 361 people (2015).
