= Túristvándi =

Coordinates: 48°03′N 22°39′E

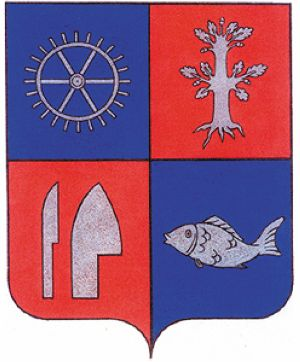
- Coat of arms
- Interactive map of Túristvándi
- Country: Hungary
- County: Szabolcs-Szatmár-Bereg

Area
  - Total: 15.22 km^{2} (5.88 sq mi)

Population (2015)
  - Total: 788
  - Density: 51.8/km^{2} (134/sq mi)
- Time zone: UTC+1 (CET)
  - Summer (DST): UTC+2 (CEST)
- Postal code: 4944
- Area code: 44

Location of Szabolcs-Szatmar-Bereg county in Hungary

Túristvándi is a village in Szabolcs-Szatmár-Bereg county, in the Northern Great Plain region of eastern Hungary. It is located in the eastern part of the county, in Satu Mare, on the shores of the Old Tour, in a wonderful natural environment, less than 5 kilometers from the Ukrainian border.

== Geography ==
It covers an area of 15.22 km^{2} (6 sq mi) and has a population of 788 people (2015).

== History ==
The first mention of the name of the settlement dates from 1142, under the name Túr, and then from 1181 the following written data. The name Istvándi was given to its owner, a member of the Kölcsei clan. At that time the settlement belonged to the area of the Czégényi monastery. In 1315 it was the property of the Kölcsei family, from whom it was confiscated by King Charles Robert for infidelity, and then in 1344 King Louis the Great returned it to the Kölcsei. From then on, the Kölcsey family and their related Kende family were the main owners. In 1496 the members of the Ujhelyi family won a royal donation to it, and in 1512 the Perényi family, and from 1521 the Báthori family also had smaller shares here. In the first half of the 19th century, even other families (Rhédey, Jármy) acquired a share of property here, while the Perényi people sold their share here to Count József Károlyi.

It changed the name of the settlement from Istvánd in 1908 to today's Túristvánd.

By the 21st century, the village had become self-sufficient, meaning that they were producing their own food.

== Economy ==
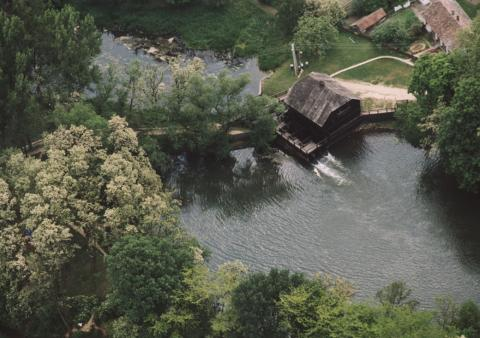
Túristvándi - watermill from above

== Natural assets ==
The main natural value of the settlement is the river Túr, which wraps around Túristvánd and its forest is extremely rich in natural values. Many species of fish can still be found in the river today: pike, catfish, carp, barbel, herring, bream, etc. Rare plant species living here include meadow grass, yellow petals, water lilies, water lilies, etc. The crested viper, for example, lives along the shores of the Tour.

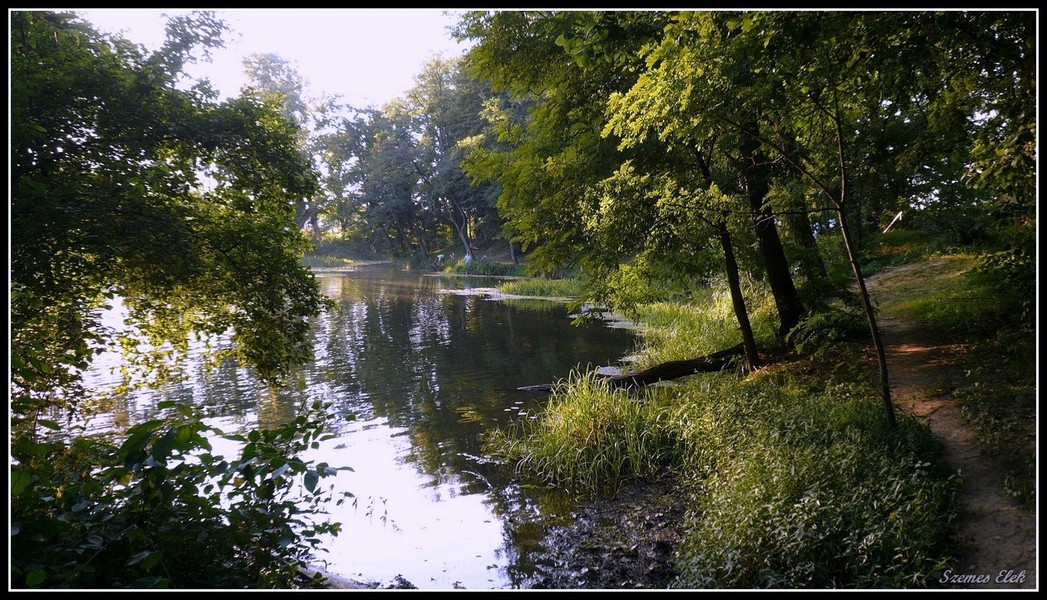
Túr river

Near the river is a protected place called “Rókás”, which is an area of primeval grass with so-called abandoned trees. The woodworms, old oaks and wild pears, which are rare in the ancient grassland meadow, provide an eye-catching sight. Rókás and its surroundings are a nature reserve.
