= List of populated places in Hungary (Sz) =

This is a list of cities, towns and villages of Hungary

KEY: T = Town ; V = Village

Name	Rank	County	District	Population	Post code
Szabadbattyán	V	Fejér	Székesfehérvári	4,544	8151
Szabadegyháza	V	Fejér	Adonyi	2,230	2432
Szabadhídvég	V	Fejér	Enyingi	984	8138
Szabadi	V	Somogy	Kaposvári	335	7253
Szabadkígyós	V	Békés	Gyulai	3,030	5712
Szabadszállás	T	Bács-Kiskun	Kunszentmiklói	6,701	6080
Szabadszentkirály	V	Baranya	Szentlorinci	784	7951
Szabás	V	Somogy	Nagyatádi	616	7544
Szabolcs	V	Szabolcs-Szatmár-Bereg	Tiszavasvári	425	4467
Szabolcsbáka	V	Szabolcs-Szatmár-Bereg	Kisvárdai	1,291	4547
Szabolcsveresmart	V	Szabolcs-Szatmár-Bereg	Kisvárdai	1,765	4496
Szada	V	Pest	Gödölloi	3,434	2111
Szágy	V	Baranya	Sásdi	187	7383
Szajk	V	Baranya	Mohácsi	794	7753
Szajla	V	Heves	Pétervásárai	870	3334
Szajol	V	Jász-Nagykun-Szolnok	Törökszentmiklósi	4,060	5081
Szakácsi	V	Borsod-Abaúj-Zemplén	Edelényi	148	3786
Szakadát	V	Tolna	Tamási	316	7071
Szakáld	V	Borsod-Abaúj-Zemplén	Tiszaújvárosi	567	3596
Szakály	V	Tolna	Tamási	1,694	7192
Szakcs	V	Tolna	Dombóvári	1,026	7213
Szakmár	V	Bács-Kiskun	Kalocsai	1,384	6336
Szaknyér	V	Tolna	Oriszentpéteri	73	9934
Szakoly	V	Szabolcs-Szatmár-Bereg	Nagykállói	2,902	4234
Szakony	V	Gyor-Moson-Sopron	Sopron–Fertodi	524	9474
Szakonyfalu	V	Vas	Szentgotthárdi	369	9983
Szákszend	V	Komárom-Esztergom	Oroszlányi	1,521	2856
Szalafo	V	Tolna	Oriszentpéteri	237	9942
Szalánta	V	Baranya	Pécsi	1,178	7811
Szalapa	V	Zala	Zalaszentgróti	233	8341
Szalaszend	V	Borsod-Abaúj-Zemplén	Encsi	1,163	3863
Szalatnak	V	Baranya	Komlói	413	7334
Szálka	V	Tolna	Szekszárdi	580	7121
Szalkszentmárton	V	Bács-Kiskun	Kunszentmiklói	3,009	6086
Szalmatercs	V	Nógrád	Salgótarjáni	518	3163
Szalonna	V	Borsod-Abaúj-Zemplén	Edelényi	1,066	3754
Szamosangyalos	V	Szabolcs-Szatmár-Bereg	Csengeri	601	4767
Szamosbecs	V	Szabolcs-Szatmár-Bereg	Csengeri	389	4745
Szamoskér	V	Szabolcs-Szatmár-Bereg	Mátészalkai	449	4721
Szamossályi	V	Szabolcs-Szatmár-Bereg	Fehérgyarmati	766	4735
Szamostatárfalva	V	Szabolcs-Szatmár-Bereg	Csengeri	342	4746
Szamosújlak	V	Szabolcs-Szatmár-Bereg	Fehérgyarmati	428	4734
Szamosszeg	V	Szabolcs-Szatmár-Bereg	Mátészalkai	2,046	4824
Szanda	V	Nógrád	Balassagyarmati	715	2697
Szank	V	Bács-Kiskun	Kiskunmajsai	2,545	6131
Szántód	V	Somogy	Balatonföldvári	370	8622
Szany	V	Gyor-Moson-Sopron	Csornai	2,269	9317
Szápár	V	Veszprém	Zirci	563	8423
Szaporca	V	Baranya	Siklósi	267	7843
Szár	V	Fejér	Bicskei	1,683	2066
Szárász	V	Baranya	Komlói	58	7184
Szárazd	V	Tolna	Tamási	282	7063
Szárföld	V	Gyor-Moson-Sopron	Kapuvári	852	9353
Szárliget	V	Komárom-Esztergom	Tatabányai	2,181	2067
Szarvas	T	Békés	Szarvasi	18,475	5540
Szarvasgede	V	Nógrád	Pásztói	451	3051
Szarvaskend	V	Tolna	Körmendi	240	9913
Szarvaskő	V	Heves	Egri	1,257	3323
Szászberek	V	Jász-Nagykun-Szolnok	Szolnoki	952	5053
Szászfa	V	Borsod-Abaúj-Zemplén	Encsi	182	3821
Szászvár	V	Baranya	Komlói	2,696	7349
Szatmárcseke	V	Szabolcs-Szatmár-Bereg	Fehérgyarmati	1,558	4945
Szátok	V	Nógrád	Rétsági	558	2656
Szatta	V	Tolna	Oriszentpéteri	79	9938
Szatymaz	V	Csongrád	Szegedi	4,323	6763
Szava	V	Baranya	Siklósi	362	7813
Százhalombatta	T	Pest	Budaörsi	17,277	2440
Szebény	V	Baranya	Mohácsi	473	7725
Szécsénke	V	Nógrád	Balassagyarmati	271	2692
Szécsény	T	Nógrád	Szécsényi	6,479	3170
Szécsényfelfalu	V	Nógrád	Szécsényi	517	3135
Szécsisziget	V	Zala	Lenti	260	8879
Szederkény	V	Baranya	Mohácsi	1,854	7751
Szedres	V	Tolna	Szekszárdi	2,499	7056
Szeged	county seat	Csongrád	Szegedi	164,883	6700^{*}
Szegerdo	V	Somogy	Marcali	273	8732
Szeghalom	T	Békés	Szeghalmi	10,151	5520
Szegi	V	Borsod-Abaúj-Zemplén	Tokaji	338	3918
Szegilong	V	Borsod-Abaúj-Zemplén	Tokaji	234	3918
Szegvár	V	Csongrád	Szentesi	4,937	6635
Székely	V	Szabolcs-Szatmár-Bereg	Ibrány–Nagyhalászi	1,116	4534
Székelyszabar	V	Baranya	Mohácsi	644	7737
Székesfehérvár	county seat	Fejér	Székesfehérvári	101,600	8000
Székkutas	V	Csongrád	Hódmezovásárhelyi	2,632	6821
Szekszárd	county seat	Tolna	Szekszárdi	35,323	7100
Szeleste	V	Tolna	Sárvári	696	9622
Szelevény	V	Jász-Nagykun-Szolnok	Kunszentmártoni	1,224	5476
Szello	V	Baranya	Pécsváradi	179	7661
Szemely	V	Baranya	Pécsi	457	7763
Szemenye	V	Tolna	Vasvári	359	9685
Szemere	V	Borsod-Abaúj-Zemplén	Encsi	390	3866
Szendehely	V	Nógrád	Rétsági	1,466	2640
Szendro	T	Borsod-Abaúj-Zemplén	Edelényi	4,372	3752
Szendrőlád	V	Borsod-Abaúj-Zemplén	Edelényi	1,832	3751
Szenna	V	Somogy	Kaposvári	760	7477
Szenta	V	Somogy	Csurgói	467	8849
Szentantalfa	V	Veszprém	Balatonfüredi	416	8272
Szentbalázs	V	Somogy	Kaposvári	344	7472
Szentbékkálla	V	Veszprém	Tapolcai	238	8281
Szentborbás	V	Somogy	Barcsi	134	7918
Szentdénes	V	Baranya	Szigetvári	324	7913
Szentdomonkos	V	Heves	Pétervásárai	1,840	3259
Szente	V	Nógrád	Rétsági	368	2655
Szentegát	V	Baranya	Szigetvári	414	7915
Szentendre	T	Pest	Szentendrei	23,119	2000
Szentes	T	Csongrád	Szentesi	30,862	6600
Szentgál	V	Veszprém	Veszprémi	2,867	8444
Szentgáloskér	V	Somogy	Kaposvári	614	7465
Szentgotthárd	T	Vas	Szentgotthárdi	9,056	9970
Szentgyörgyvár	V	Zala	Keszthely–Hévízi	329	8393
Szentgyörgyvölgy	V	Zala	Lenti	485	8975
Szentimrefalva	V	Veszprém	Sümegi	225	8475
Szentistván	V	Borsod-Abaúj-Zemplén	Mezokövesdi	2,672	3418
Szentistvánbaksa	V	Borsod-Abaúj-Zemplén	Szikszói	295	3844
Szentjakabfa	V	Veszprém	Balatonfüredi	118	8272
Szentkatalin	V	Baranya	Szentlorinci	155	7681
Szentkirály	V	Bács-Kiskun	Kecskeméti	1,989	9719
Szentkirályszabadja	V	Veszprém	Balatonalmádi	2,122	8225
Szentkozmadombja	V	Zala	Zalaegerszegi	101	8947
Szentlászló	V	Baranya	Szigetvári	878	7936
Szentliszló	V	Zala	Letenyei	343	8893
Szentlorinc	T	Baranya	Szentlorinci	7,258	7940
Szentlorinckáta	V	Pest	Nagykátai	1,938	2255
Szentmargitfalva	V	Zala	Letenyei	121	8872
Szentmártonkáta	V	Pest	Nagykátai	4,811	2254
Szentpéterfa	V	Tolna	Szombathelyi	1,049	9799
Szentpéterfölde	V	Zala	Lenti	149	8953
Szentpéterszeg	V	Hajdú-Bihar	Berettyóújfalui	1,216	4121
Szentpéterúr	V	Zala	Zalaegerszegi	1,056	8762
Szenyér	V	Somogy	Marcali	326	8717
Szepetnek	V	Zala	Nagykanizsai	1,789	8861
Szerecseny	V	Gyor-Moson-Sopron	Téti	903	8544
Szeremle	V	Bács-Kiskun	Bajai	1,560	6512
Szerencs	T	Borsod-Abaúj-Zemplén	Szerencsi	10,184	3900
Szerep	V	Hajdú-Bihar	Püspökladányi	1,676	4163
Szergény	V	Tolna	Celldömölki	408	9523
Szigetbecse	V	Pest	Ráckevei	1,314	2321
Szigetcsép	V	Pest	Ráckevei	2,348	2317
Szigethalom	V	Pest	Ráckevei	13,151	2315
Szigetmonostor	V	Pest	Szentendrei	1,713	2015
Szigetszentmárton	V	Pest	Ráckevei	1,880	2318
Szigetszentmiklós	T	Pest	Ráckevei	24,678	2310
Szigetújfalu	V	Pest	Ráckevei	2,086	2319
Szigetvár	T	Baranya	Szigetvári	11,392	7900
Szigliget	V	Veszprém	Tapolcai	935	8264
Szihalom	V	Heves	Füzesabonyi	3,417	3377
Szijártóháza	V	Zala	Lenti	51	8969
Szikszó	T	Borsod-Abaúj-Zemplén	Szikszói	5,988	3800
Szil	V	Gyor-Moson-Sopron	Csornai	1,337	9326
Szilágy	V	Baranya	Pécsváradi	326	7664
Szilaspogony	V	Nógrád	Salgótarjáni	401	3125
Szilsárkány	V	Gyor-Moson-Sopron	Csornai	711	9312
Szilvágy	V	Zala	Lenti	237	8986
Szilvás	V	Baranya	Pécsi	194	7833
Szilvásvárad	V	Heves	Bélapátfalvai	3,782	3348
Szilvásszentmárton	V	Somogy	Kaposvári	233	7477
Szin	V	Borsod-Abaúj-Zemplén	Edelényi	785	3761
Szinpetri	V	Borsod-Abaúj-Zemplén	Edelényi	249	3761
Szirák	V	Nógrád	Pásztói	1,196	3044
Szirmabesenyo	V	Borsod-Abaúj-Zemplén	Miskolci	4,729	3711
Szob	T	Pest	Szobi	2,969	2628
Szokolya	V	Pest	Váci	1,738	2624
Szólád	V	Somogy	Balatonföldvári	615	8625
Szolnok	county seat	Jász-Nagykun-Szolnok	Szolnoki	76,986	5000
Szombathely	county seat	Tolna	Szombathelyi	81,113	9700
Szomód	V	Komárom-Esztergom	Tatai	2,044	2896
Szomolya	V	Borsod-Abaúj-Zemplén	Mezokövesdi	1,724	3411
Szomor	V	Komárom-Esztergom	Tatabányai	1,077	2822
Szorgalmatos	V	Szabolcs-Szatmár-Bereg	Tiszavasvári	926	4441
Szorosad	V	Somogy	Tabi	107	7285
Szoc	V	Veszprém	Ajkai	448	8452
Szoce	V	Tolna	Oriszentpéteri	424	9935
Szod	V	Pest	Váci	3,049	2134
Szodliget	V	Pest	Váci	4,233	2133
Szögliget	V	Borsod-Abaúj-Zemplén	Edelényi	758	3762
Szoke	V	Baranya	Pécsi	168	7833
Szőkéd	V	Baranya	Pécsi	401	7763
Szokedencs	V	Somogy	Marcali	341	8736
Szőlősardó	V	Borsod-Abaúj-Zemplén	Edelényi	137	3757
Szőlősgyörök	V	Somogy	Lengyeltóti	1,222	8692
Szörény	V	Baranya	Szigetvári	73	7976
Szűcs	V	Heves	Bélapátfalvai	849	3341
Szuha	V	Nógrád	Bátonyterenyei	743	3154
Szuhafo	V	Borsod-Abaúj-Zemplén	Kazincbarcikai	194	3726
Szuhakálló	V	Borsod-Abaúj-Zemplén	Kazincbarcikai	1,036	3731
Szuhogy	V	Borsod-Abaúj-Zemplén	Edelényi	1,263	3734
Szulimán	V	Baranya	Szigetvári	274	7932
Szulok	V	Somogy	Barcsi	715	7539
Szurdokpüspöki	V	Nógrád	Pásztói	1,949	3064
Szűcsi	V	Heves	Gyöngyösi	1,738	3034
Szügy	V	Nógrád	Balassagyarmati	1,465	2699
Szur	V	Baranya	Mohácsi	309	7735

== Notes ==
- Cities marked with * have several different post codes, the one here is only the most general one.
