= Csenger District =

Coordinates: 47.8333°N 22.6167°E

Csenger District Csengeri járás
- Districts of Hungary
- Coat of arms

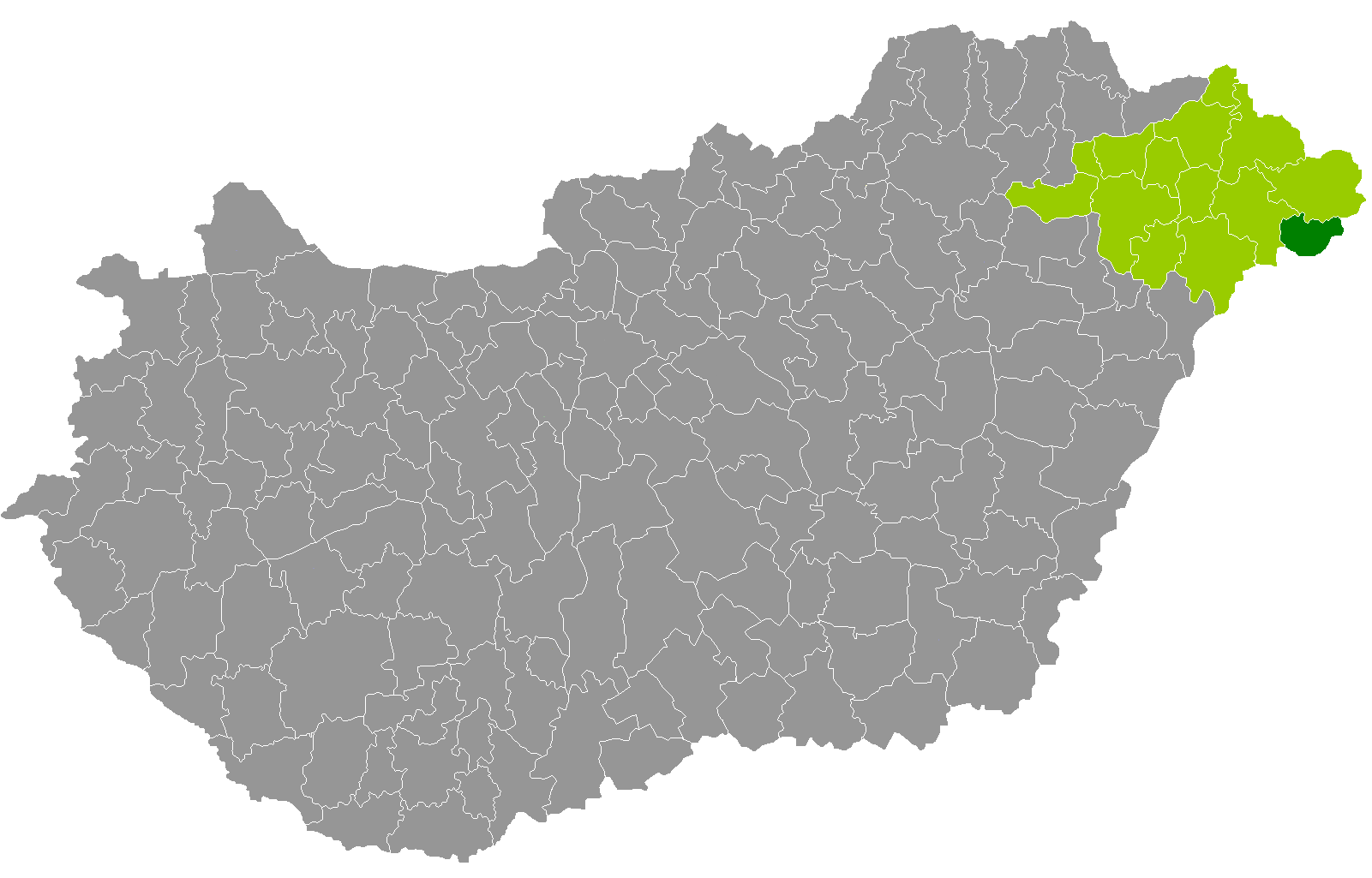
- Csenger District within Hungary and Szabolcs-Szatmár-Bereg County.
- Country: Hungary
- County: Szabolcs-Szatmár-Bereg
- District seat: Csenger

Area
  - Total: 246.51 km^{2} (95.18 sq mi)
  - Rank: 11th in Szabolcs-Szatmár-Bereg

Population (2011 census)
  - Total: 13,485
  - Rank: 13th in Szabolcs-Szatmár-Bereg
  - Density: 55/km^{2} (140/sq mi)

Csenger (Hungarian: Csengeri járás) is a district in eastern part of Szabolcs-Szatmár-Bereg County. Csenger is also the name of the town where the district seat is found. The district is located in the Northern Great Plain Statistical Region. This district is a part of Szatmár historical and geographical region.

== Geography ==
Csenger District borders with Fehérgyarmat District to the north, the Romanian county of Satu Mare to the east and south, and with Mátészalka District to the west. The number of the inhabited places in Csenger District is 11.

== Municipalities ==
The district has 1 town, 2 large villages and 8 villages (ordered by population, as of 1 January 2013):

- **Csenger** (4,924) – district seat
- Csengersima (779)
- Csengerújfalu (819)
- Komlódtótfalu (122)
- Pátyod (675)
- Porcsalma (2,682)
- Szamosangyalos (477)
- Szamosbecs (374)
- Szamostatárfalva (308)
- Tyukod (2,041)
- Ura (638)

The bolded municipality is a city, municipalities in italics are large villages.

== Demographics ==
Religion in Csenger District (2011 census)
1. Calvinism (61.1%)
2. Greek Catholicism (13.2%)
3. Catholic Church (8.10%)
4. Orthodoxy (0.40%)
5. Other religions (1.40%)
6. Non-religious (3.20%)
7. Atheists (0.10%)
8. Undeclared (12.5%)

In 2011, it had a population of 13,485 and the population density was 55/km^{2}.

Year	County population	Change
2011	13,485	n/a

=== Ethnicity ===
Besides the Hungarian majority, the main minorities are the Roma (approx. 2,500) and Romanians (200).

Total population (2011 census): 13,485
Ethnic groups (2011 census): Identified themselves: 14,221 persons:

- Hungarians: 12,262 (86.22%)
- Gypsies: 1,704 (11.98%)
- Romanians: 178 (1.25%)
- Others and indefinable: 77 (0.54%)

Approx. 1,000 persons in Csenger District did declare more than one ethnic group at the 2011 census.

=== Religion ===
Religious adherence in the county according to 2011 census:

- Reformed – 8,244;
- Catholic – 2,872 (Greek Catholic – 1,783; Roman Catholic – 1,089);
- Orthodox – 55;
- other religions – 181;
- Non-religious – 434;
- Atheism – 11;
- Undeclared – 1,688.

== Gallery ==
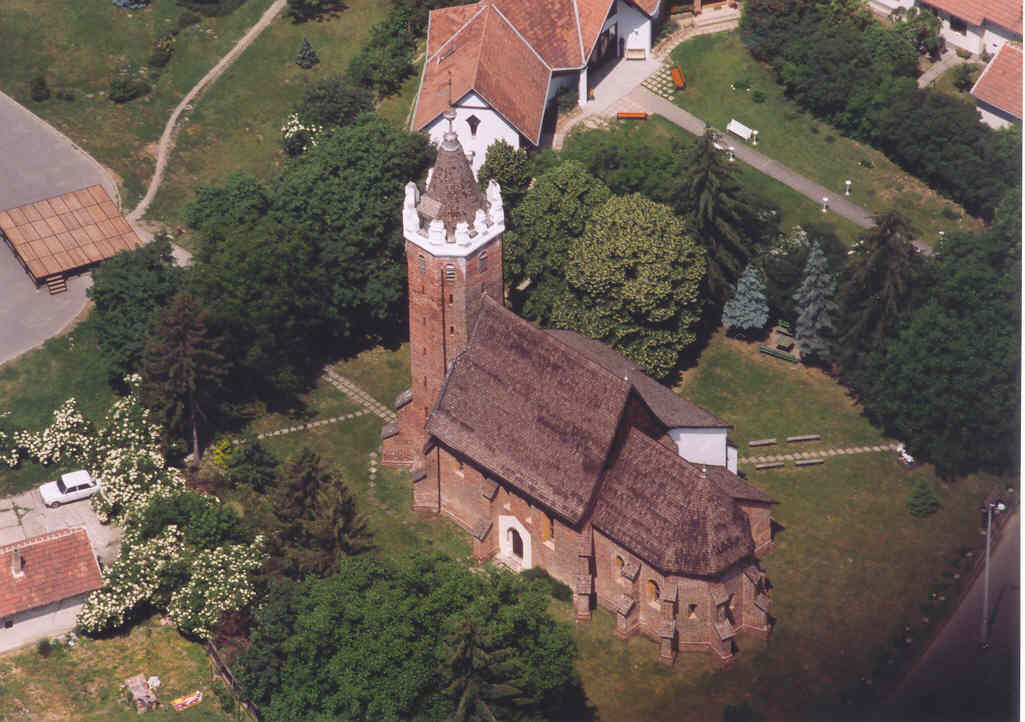
Csenger, the district seat

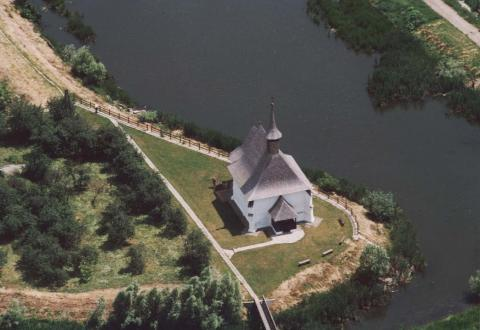
Aerial view of Csengersima

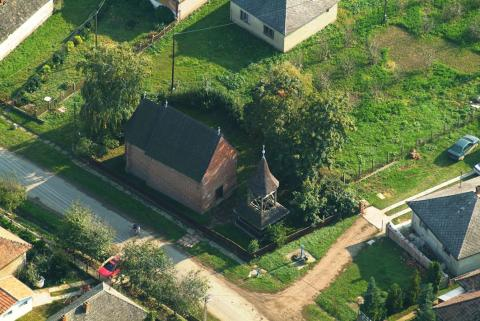
Aerial view of Szamostatárfalva

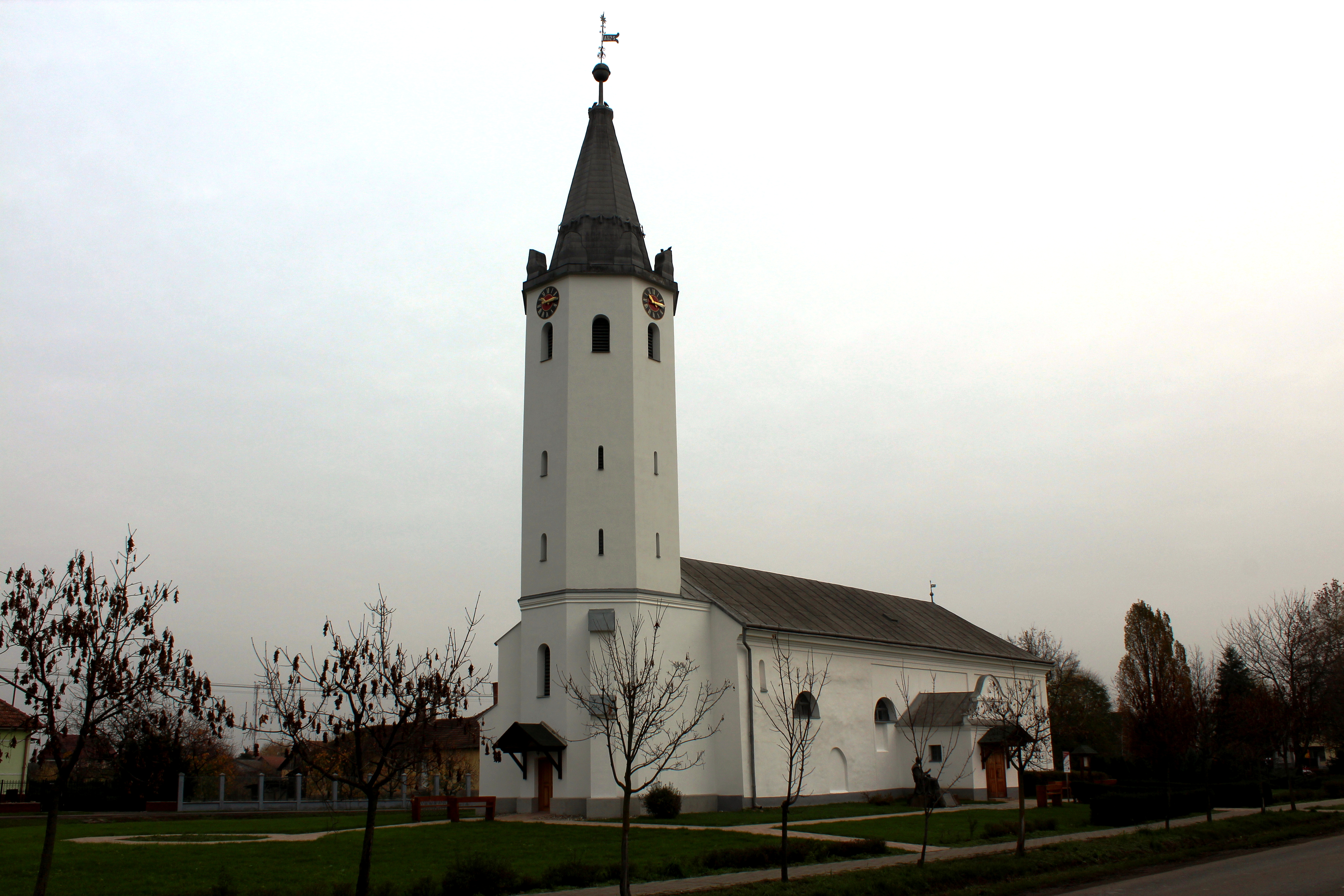
Reformed Church in Porcsalma

== See also ==
- List of cities and towns of Hungary
