= Cered =

- Coat of arms

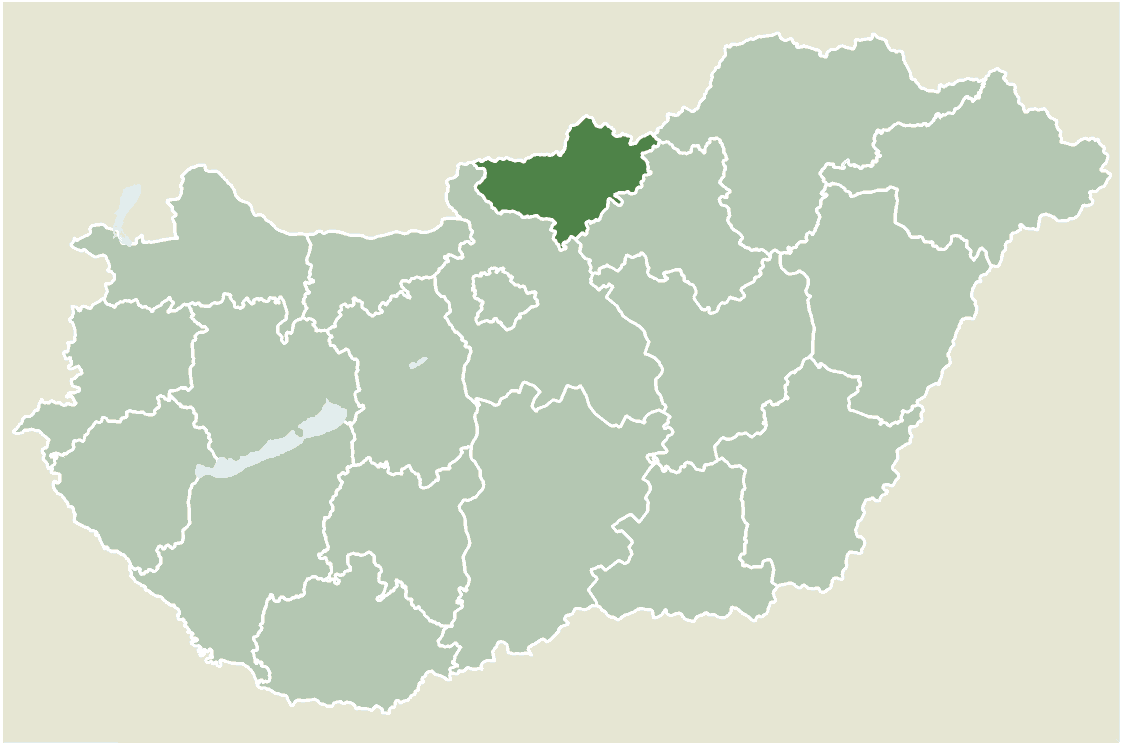
- Location of Nógrád county in Hungary

- Location of Cered
- Coordinates: 48.14545°N 19.96569°E
- Country: Hungary
- County: Nógrád

Area
  - Total: 38.58 km^{2} (14.90 sq mi)
- Elevation: 314 m (1,030 ft)
- Highest elevation: 616 m (2,021 ft)
- Lowest elevation: 206 m (676 ft)
  - Density: 24.42/km^{2} (63.2/sq mi)
- Time zone: UTC+1 (CET)
  - Summer (DST): UTC+2 (CEST)
- Postal code: 3123
- Area code: 32

Cered is a village in Nógrád County in the Salgótarján District in Hungary. The size of Cered is 35.58 km² with a population density of 24.42/km². As of 2025, Cered has around 942 inhabitants—a -1.9% decrease, since 2022 when Cered had around 983 inhabitants. Cered is located north east of Budapest and borders the southern Slovak village of Tachty. Cered is part of the Novohrad-Nógrád UNESCO Global Geopark.

== Location ==
It is located in the northeastern part of the county, right next to the Slovak border, in the Upper Tarna Hills, in the source area of the Tarna; the small river originates west of it, at the foot of the Medves Plateau. The settlement is part of the historical Medvesalja region; its administrative border coincides with the state border for more than 15 kilometres (9 mi)

On the Hungarian side of the border, it has only four settlement neighbors: to the east it borders Zabar (7.5 km), to the southeast it borders Szilaspogony (6 km), to the southwest it borders Bárna, and to the west it borders Rónabánya (9 km), which belongs to Salgótarján; the nearest Hungarian city is Salgótarján, 21 kilometres (13 mi) away.

The nearest neighboring settlement on the other side of the border is Tachty, but it also borders Studená, Nová Bašta and Petrovce.

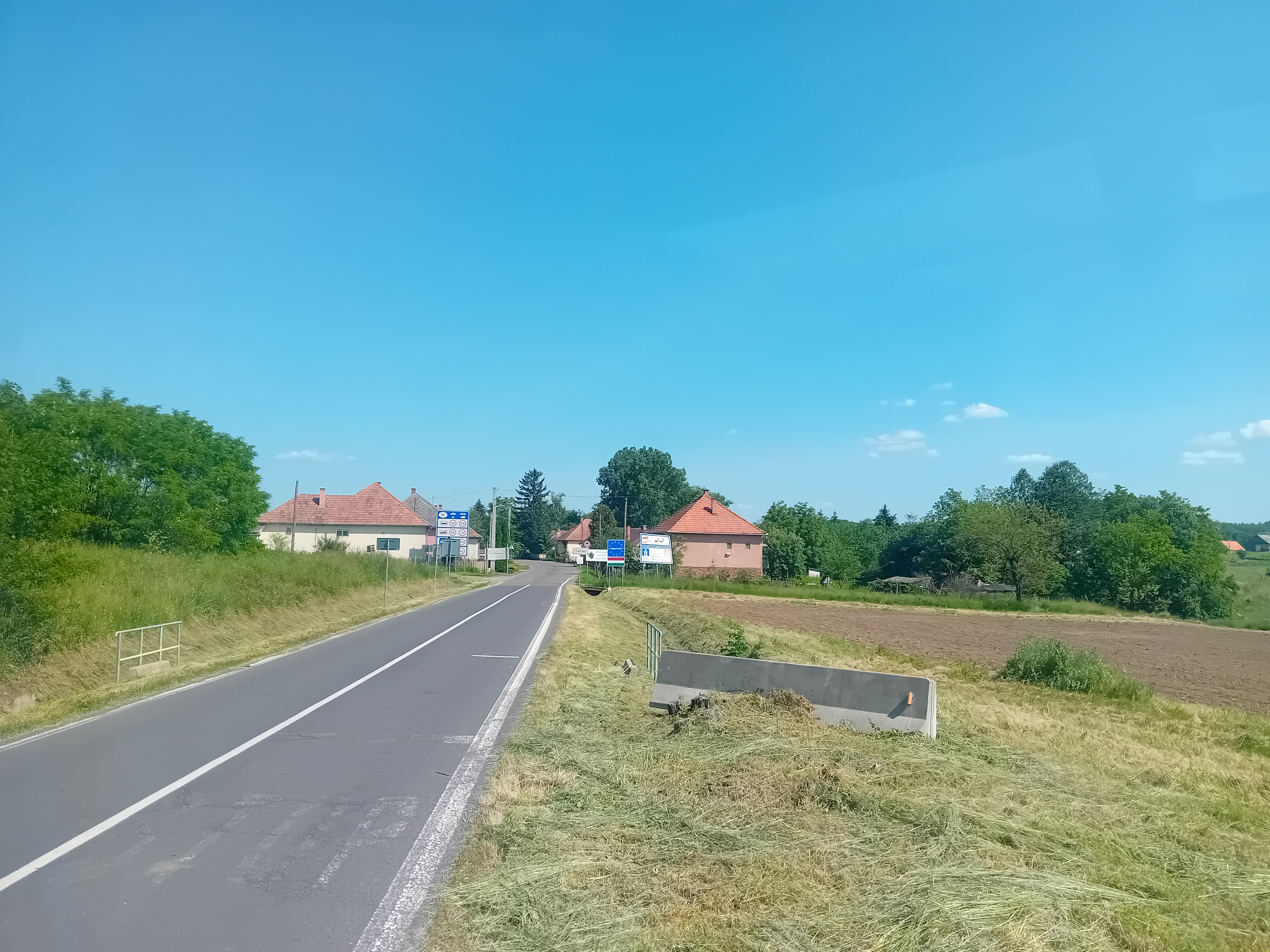
Slovak-Hungarian border by Cered (Slovak side)

== Transport ==
Cered can only be reached by road, from Salgótarján or Zabar on road 2304; from Szilaspogony on side road 23 111. It is connected to the national border by side road 23 119.

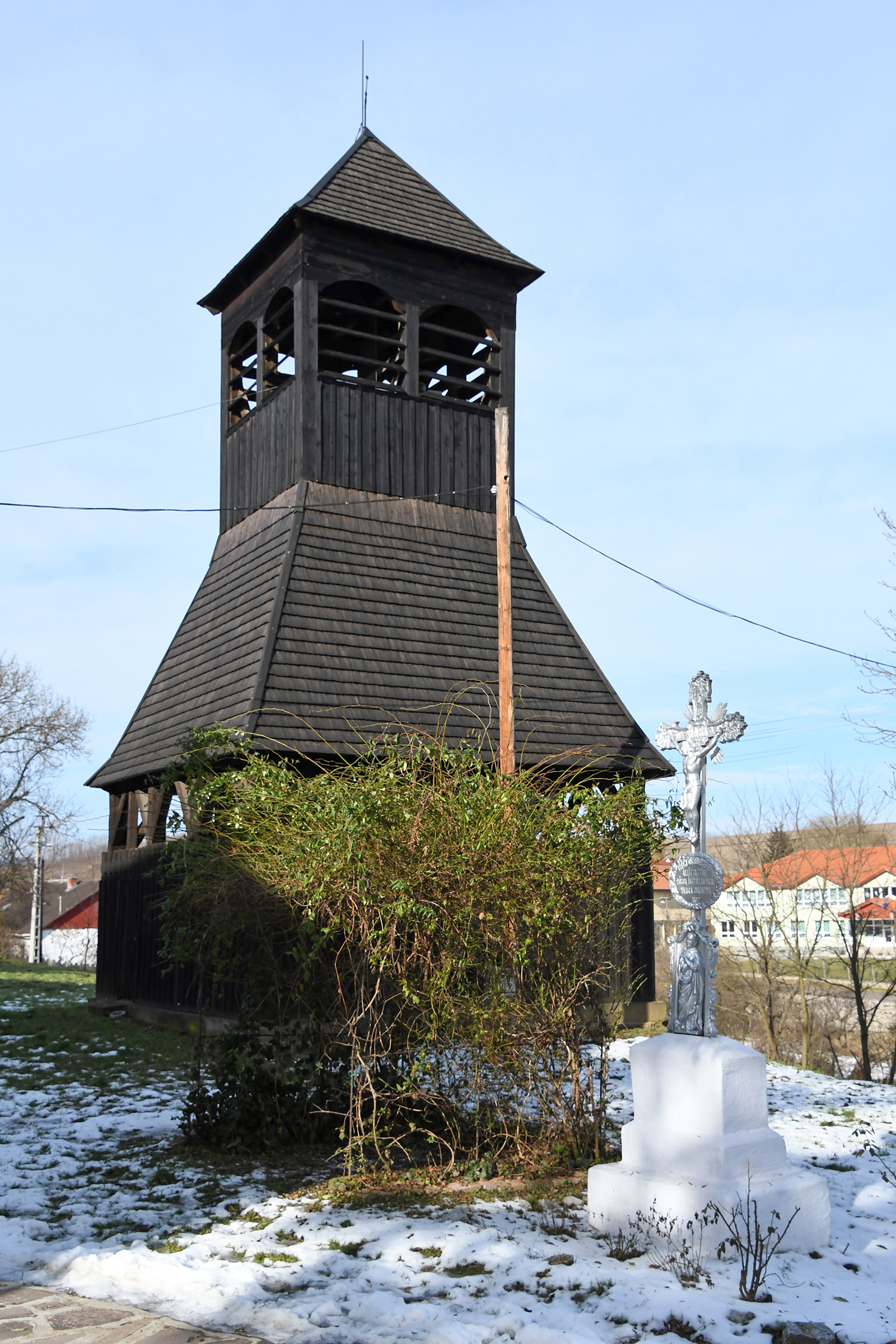
Bell tower

== History ==
Cered was already a significant town at the beginning of the 15th century. Its name was first mentioned in documents in 1405 as Chereg. In 1427, 23 of its gates were listed; at that time, László Szécsényi was its owner. Until 1461, it belonged to the county of Gömör, but was part of the castle of Somoskő .

After the death of László Széchenyi, Guthi passed to Mihály Országh and the Lossonczy family. At the beginning of the 16th century, György Kun was also a landowner here, after whose death without heirs, King John I donated these estates to István Werbőczy in 1533.

In 1548, Tamás Nagy and Ferenc Ragyolczi, and in 1598 Ferenc Berényi were the landlords of the village.

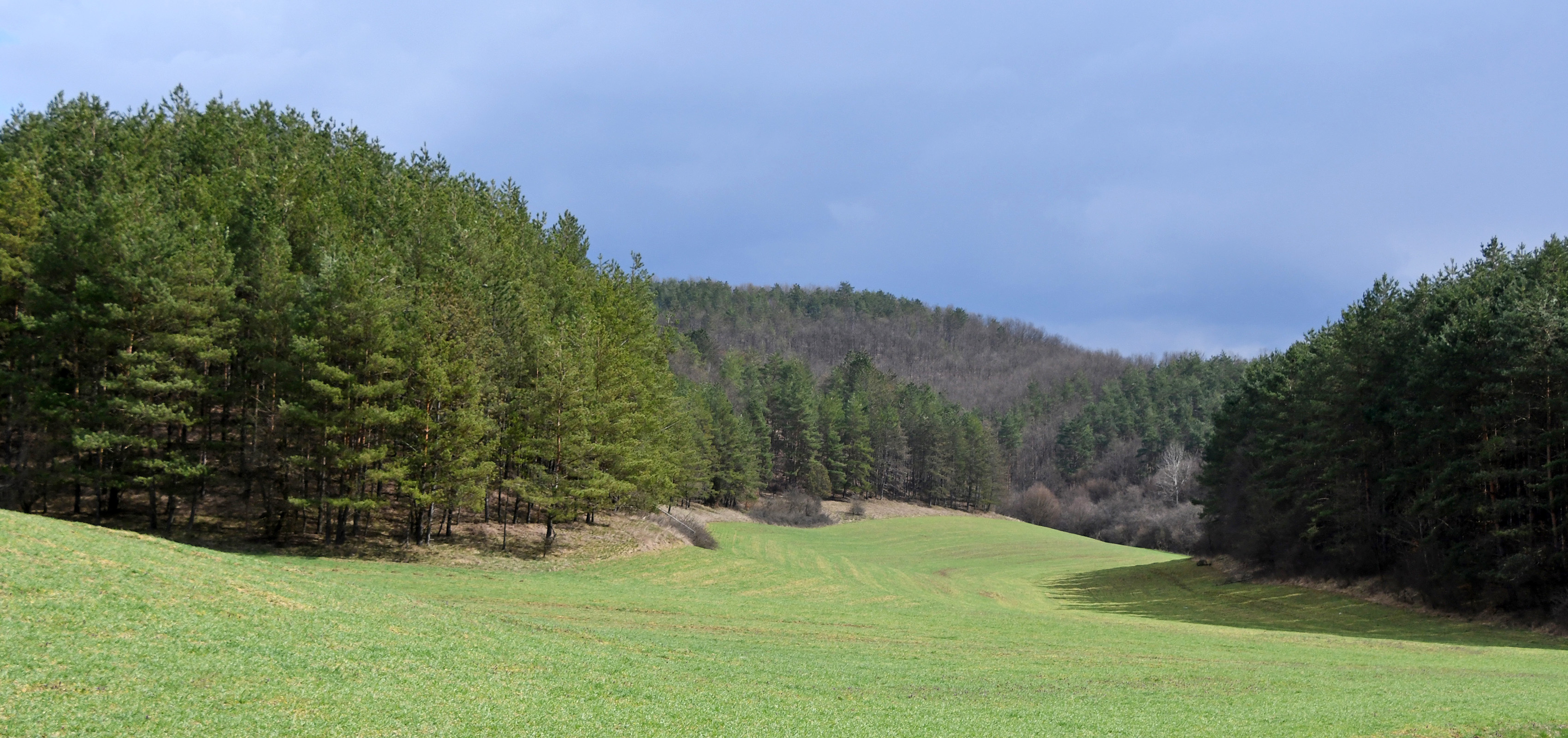
Medves Mountains

In 1716, 16 households were registered there, and in 1720. In the middle of the 18th century, one part belonged to the Fáy family, the other to Somoskő, and then in the second half of the 18th century it came into the possession of the Baron Péterffy family. With the death of the last branch of the Péterffy family: Baron János Péterffy without heirs, King Francis I donated their estates here to Count Károly Keglevich, who was solemnly incorporated into the estate on 16 May 1808. The incorporation was carried out by Antal Mocsáry, the magistrate of Nógrád County.

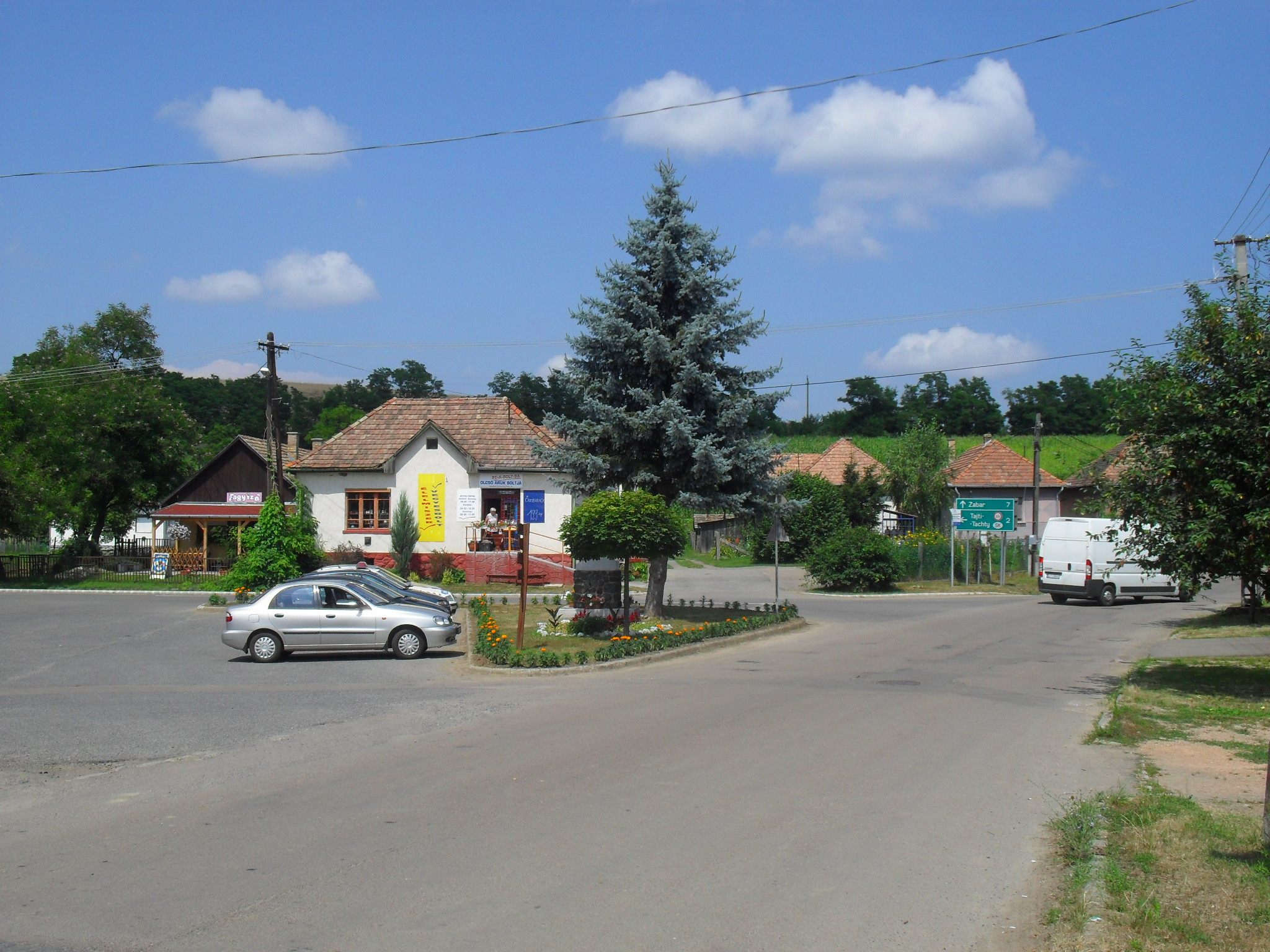
Cered Square

During the 1770 landownership settlement, in addition to the Baron Péterffy family, Count László Teleki, Gáspár Kubinyi, Gedeon Ráday and György Szilvásy were the landowners here, and in 1826, in addition to the Count Keglevich family, Count Thoroczkay was the largest landowner, later until 1891 Baron Radvánszky, and in the early 1900s, Béla Humayer and József Pauncz were the largest landowners. The manor house in the village was built by Baron Géza Radvánszky.

In 1903, the entire village burned down in a major fire and was since rebuilt.

== Public life ==
=== Mayors ===
- 1990–1994: Tibor Tajti (independent)
- 1994–1998: Tibor Tajti (independent)
- 1998–2002: Árpád Czene (independent)
- 2002–2006: Árpád Czene (independent)
- 2006–2010: Árpád Czene (MSZP)
- 2010–2014: Árpád Czene (independent)
- 2014–2019: László Dániel (independent)
- 2019–2024: László Tajti (Fidesz - KDNP)
- 2024– : Ferenc Petrovics (independent)

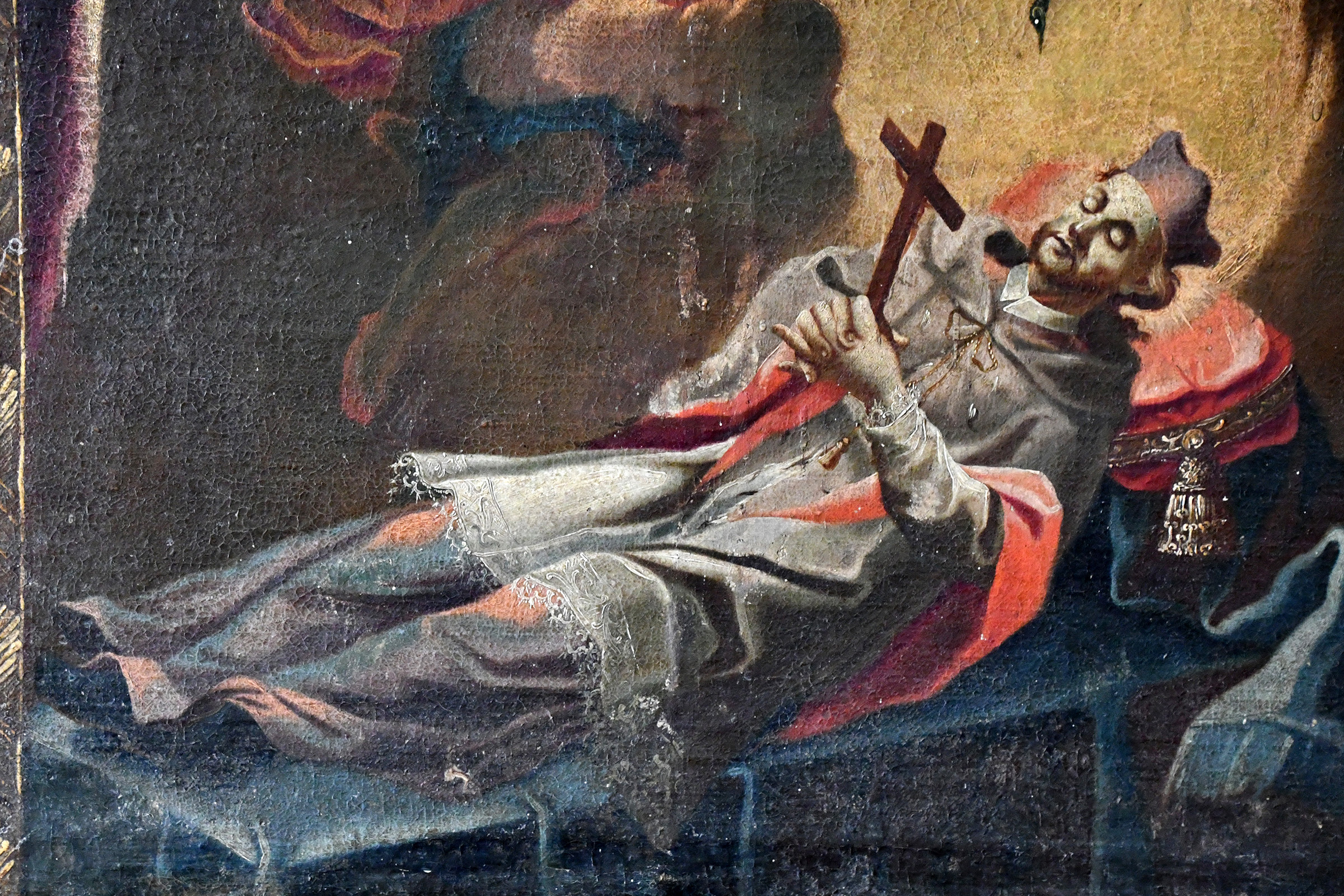
Artwork inside Cered Church

== Population ==
In 2001, 94% of the population of the settlement identified themselves as Hungarian, and 6% as Roma.

In the 2011 census, 82.5% of the population identified themselves as Hungarian, 6.6% as Roma, and 0.2% as German (17.5% did not declare; due to double identities, the total may be greater than 100%). The religious distribution was as follows: Roman Catholic 66.3%, Reformed 1.8%, non-denominational 6.9% (24% did not declare).

In 2022, 92.4% of the population identified themselves as Hungarian, 14.9% as Roma, 0.4% as Slovak, 0.4% as German, 0.1-0.1% as Bulgarian and Ruthenian, 1.5% as other, non-domestic nationality (7.6% did not declare; due to dual identities, the total may be greater than 100%). According to their religion, 59.7% were Roman Catholic, 1.2% Greek Catholic, 1.1% Calvinist, 0.10% Jewish, 0.1% Orthodox, 1.2% other Christian, 0.9% other Catholic, 11.7% non-denominational (23.9% did not respond).

Age Distribution (2022)
0–9 years	95
10–19 years	72
20–29 years	88
30–39 years	100
40–49 years	146
50–59 years	132
60–69 years	154
70–79 years	120
80–89 years	62
90+ years	14

Gender (2025)
Males	453
Females	489

Population by year
Year	Population
1870	711
1880	726
1890	767
1900	1147
1910	1239
1920	1435
1930	1630
1941	1447
1949	1798
1960	1760
1970	1753
1980	1576
1990	1433
2001	1282
2011	1170
2022	983
2025	942

== Sights ==
=== Attractions ===
- All Saints' Roman Catholic Church: Built in 1731, in Baroque style, restored in 1884.
- Folk wooden belfry: from the 18th century, with a shingle roof.
- Radvánszky-Humayer mansion: built before 1891, today a village hall.
  - The park surrounding the mansion, whose chestnut and plane trees may be the same age as the building.
- A nearly 900 m long fishing lake system built with four dams.
- Mountains of the Medves Mountains, with diverse geological formations, rare flora and fauna. Partly a nature reserve.

=== Events ===
- International Art Colony of Cered since 1996 Archived December 5, 2021 at the Wayback Machine (Artcolony Cered). Founders: Cecília Kun, Csaba Fürjesi, László Sánta
- Salgó Rally
- September Festival
