= Csenger =

- Town
- Coat of arms

- Location within Szabolcs-Szatmár-Bereg County Location within Hungary
- Coordinates: 47°50′N 22°41′E
- Country: Hungary
- County: Szabolcs-Szatmár-Bereg
- District: Csenger

Area
  - Total: 36.16 km^{2} (13.96 sq mi)

Population (2015)
  - Total: 4,870
  - Density: 135/km^{2} (349/sq mi)
- Time zone: UTC+1 (CET)
  - Summer (DST): UTC+2 (CEST)
- Postal code: 4765
- Area code: (+36) 44
- Website: www.csenger.hu

Csenger is a town in Szabolcs-Szatmár-Bereg county, in the Northern Great Plain region of eastern Hungary. It is known for being the poorest town in Hungary. In 2023, the Hungarian Prison Service Headquarters announced that it is constructing a new prison in the town, with inmates producing metal and wooden furnishings for the new facility.

== Geography ==
The town covers an area of 36.16 km^{2} (14 sq mi) and has a population of 4,870 people (2015). It lies on left bank of the river Szamos, on the border with Romania.

== Twin towns – sister cities ==
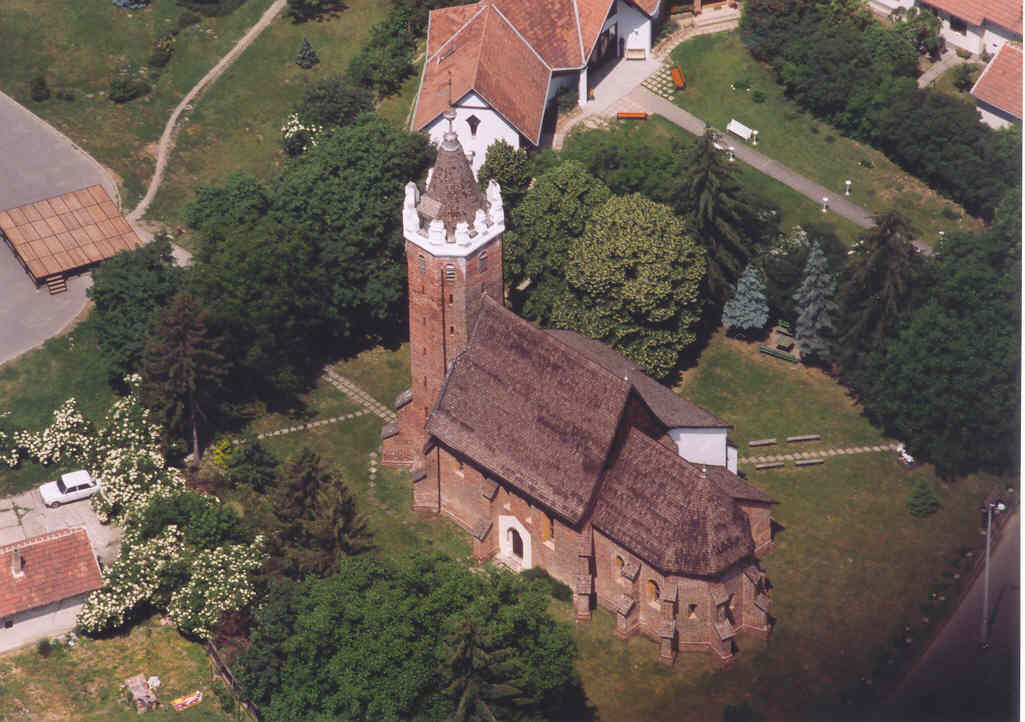
Csenger church

Csenger is twinned with:

- Covasna, Romania
- Hauenstein, Germany
- Negrești-Oaș, Romania
- Tășnad, Romania
- Vetiș, Romania

== Natives ==
- István Apáti, jurist and politician
