= Tyukod =

Coordinates: 47°51′N 22°33′E

- Interactive map of Tyukod
- Country: Hungary
- County: Szabolcs-Szatmár-Bereg

Area
  - Total: 62.22 km^{2} (24.02 sq mi)

Population (2015)
  - Total: 2,025
  - Density: 32.6/km^{2} (84/sq mi)
- Time zone: UTC+1 (CET)
  - Summer (DST): UTC+2 (CEST)
- Postal code: 4762
- Area code: 44

Location of Szabolcs-Szatmar-Bereg county in Hungary

Tyukod is a village in Szabolcs-Szatmár-Bereg county, in the Northern Great Plain region of eastern Hungary.

== History of Tyukod ==
Written memories first mention the name of the village in 1181. It appears in several variations in later years: Tenykod, Tenykowd, Oechidkuttya, Egyedkuttya, Eketyukod, but an exact record has not confirmed when it became known by this name. The village likely existed as a settlement before, but there were no written records about it.

The majority of the area was covered by marshes, which were not continuous but formed smaller and larger islands suitable for human settlement. These settlements gradually disappeared after floods, and the residents relocated to the village.

So, what do we know about the name Tyukod? There are several versions: "The ancient rulers were the Tyukodi clan, but the Kölcseys also owned it. The Hungarian word 'tyúk' (hen) as a personal name comes from the noun with the -d suffix."

The Tatar invasion devastated the settlement. The inhabitants fled to the islands of the marsh, but they completely lost their abandoned possessions. The estates of the fallen were granted by King Béla IV.

Almost every noble from Tyukod participated in the Dózsa Peasant/Serf Revolt. The nobles who joined the peasant armies were all punished with confiscation of their property. According to a document, most of the estates fell into the hands of the Báthory family.

Rákóczi's call also summoned the people of Tyukod to war. Writings still list the participating nobles and infantry soldiers by name today.

One significant event at the end of the century was the witch trial held in Szatmár, where two Tyukod witches – Anna Kós and Heléna Rekettyés – were sentenced to the stake.

During the 1848 Revolution, Tyukod also participated with an independent unit. After the revolution's failure, only a few returned home; most were enlisted in the Austrian army. During this time, the Uray family gained significant estates, and for their loyal services, they were elevated to baronial rank. Their memory is preserved today by their family castle.

Many from Tyukod bled in both World Wars. Plaques proclaim their names on a memorial erected among the first in the county following the end of the wars.

During the years of mass emigration, many from the settlement left in search of better opportunities on other continents—especially in America and Canada.

Some historical milestones from the life of the village:

- In 1899, the new town hall was completed, and there has been a leadership here since then.
- In 1904, the railway line was built near the border of Porcsalma, which was economically significant for the people of Tyukod.
- In 1913, 60 students from the state school went on a trip to Nagybánya. This was the first school excursion.
- In February 1925, the youth association was formed, later followed by the voluntary fire brigade.
- In 1929, the public lighting network of the village began to be established.
- In 1933, another school building was completed.
- Since 1937, the village has had its own medical care.
- From 1942, there was a hemp processing plant in our area, and after its closure, the local subsidiary of the Nyíregyháza Cannery was established in 1964.
- In 1948, the newly acquired lands helped the effectiveness of the farming of all landowners, thanks to the established Agricultural Machinery Station. From 1970, it was taken over by the still-operating Kossuth Cooperative.
- In 1950, the local council was established, which operated as a joint council with Ura village from 1973 to 1990. Around the same time, the settlement was declared Tyukod Large Village.
- Until 1 August 1969, Tyukod's administrative area belonged to the former Csenger district, and with its cessation, it moved over to the Mátészalka district.
- The period after the 1970 flood – although our village was not directly affected by the flood – transformed the appearance of the settlement. The village's present form took shape in the 1970s and 1980s. Alongside our public institutions – school, kindergarten, grocery store, pharmacy, gymnasium – hundreds of houses were rebuilt. Today, there is no thatched roof house, a fence made of reeds or posts, which was once nothing more than a gift from the marsh.
- By 1992, the paving of the roads in the village was completed with a solid surface, the water supply network was built, and natural gas was ignited. Almost two-thirds of the houses are equipped with a landline telephone.
- The first major investment of the new millennium was the construction of the sewage system.
- In the second year of the millennium, the renovation of the Reformed church began, and the appearance of the grocery store, pharmacy, and the local savings cooperative was transformed. The road passing through the village received a new surface, and the transformation of the former clay pit pond is in progress.

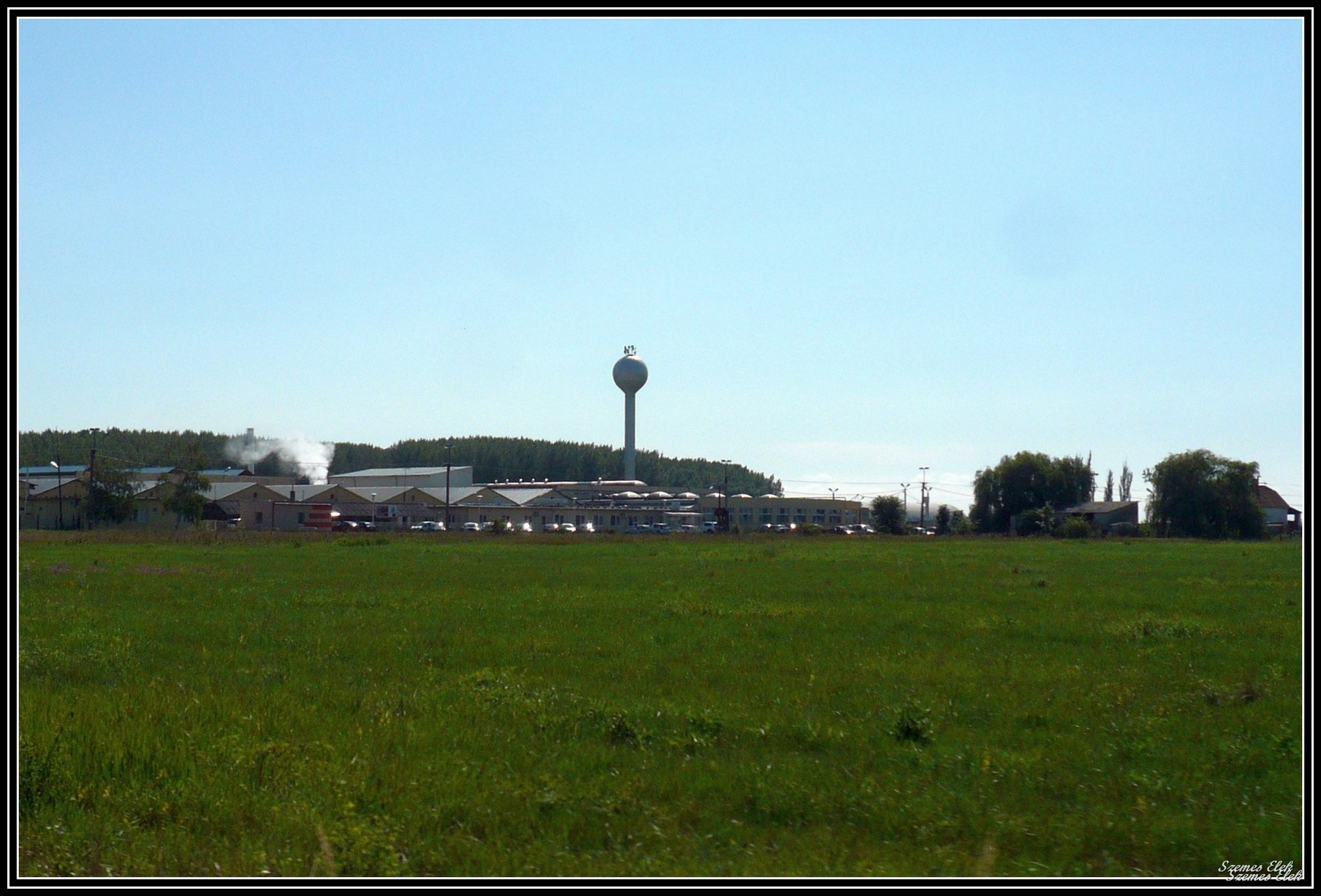
The canning factory of Tyukod.

== Jewish life ==
The Jewish community of Tyukod was part of the Jewish community around Csenger, known as straightforward, God-fearing people. During the 1848/49 Revolution and War of Independence, Klein Farkas, a tenant farmer, became a national guard. Klein József, another member, fell in World War I. The Jewish community mainly engaged in trade. After the First Vienna Decision, Herskovits Mórné lived in Tyukod. She owned a mixed goods store, which she ran jointly with her two sons, Dezső and Mór. Klein Antal also had a significant mixed goods store, led by his son, Klein József, from 1934.

The Jewish community did not have a synagogue, only a two-room, red-tiled peasant house stood among others, separated by a small entrance. The room on the right housed the ritual slaughterer, and on the left was the room used as the local temple. In 1941, the Jewish population numbered 80. In 1944, 77 people were deported first to the Mátészalka ghetto and then to Auschwitz. Only 12 people, including one woman, survived the Holocaust, but as they did not find spiritual peace, they left the settlement in 1949. The only woman among them lives in Israel.

Tyukod has a Jewish cemetery.

== Geography ==
It covers an area of 62.22 km^{2} (24 sq mi) and has a population of 2025 people (2015).
