= Pátyod =

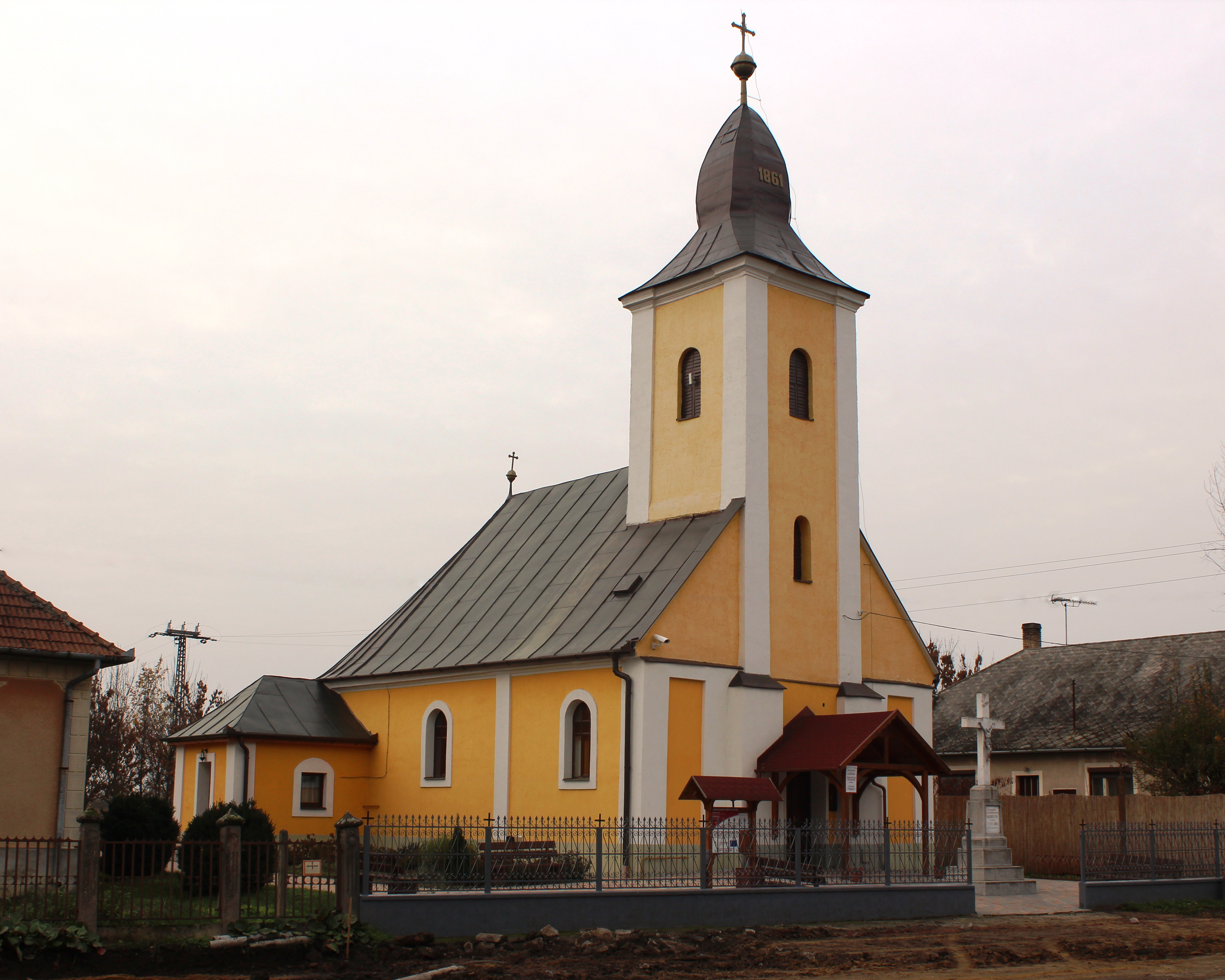
- St. Stephen of Hungary Church in Pátyod

- Location within Hungary
- Coordinates: 47°51′51″N 22°37′28″E
- Country: Hungary
- County: Szabolcs-Szatmár-Bereg

Area
  - Total: 9.05 km^{2} (3.49 sq mi)

Population (2015)
  - Total: 663
  - Density: 72.9/km^{2} (189/sq mi)
- Time zone: UTC+1 (CET)
  - Summer (DST): UTC+2 (CEST)
- Postal code: 4766
- Area code: 44

Pátyod is a village in Szabolcs-Szatmár-Bereg county, in the Northern Great Plain region of eastern Hungary.

== Geography ==
Pátyod covers an area of 9.05 km^{2} (3 sq mi) and has a population of 663 people (2015).
