= Ura, Hungary =

Ura
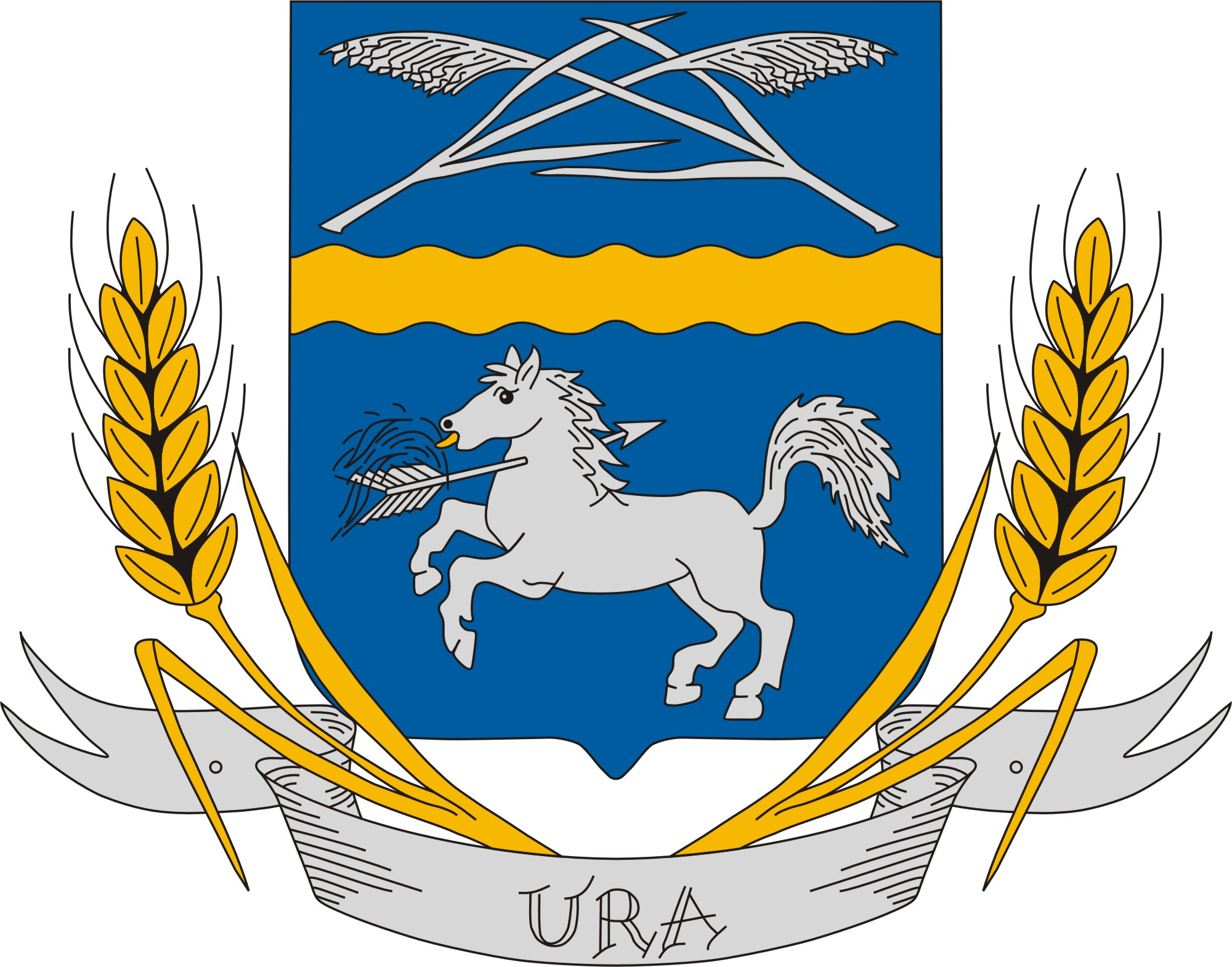
- Coat of arms

- Location of Ura in Hungary
- Coordinates: 47.82°N 22.62°E
- Country: Hungary
- Region: Northern Great Plain
- County: Szabolcs-Szatmár-Bereg

Area
  - Total: 32.34 km^{2} (12.49 sq mi)

Population (2015)
  - Total: 610
  - Density: 19/km^{2} (49/sq mi)
- Time zone: UTC+1 (CET)
  - Summer (DST): UTC+2 (CEST)
- Postal code: 4763
- Area code: +36 44
- Website: http://urakozseg.hu/

Ura is a village in Szabolcs-Szatmár-Bereg County in the Northern Great Plain region of eastern Hungary. Small Hungarian village near the borders with Romania and Ukraine.

== Geography ==
It covers an area of 32.34 km^{2} (12 sq mi) and has a population of 610 people (2015).

== History ==
Its Ura is a settlement built on the edge of the Ecsedi bog. Its name is mentioned in diplomas in 1374, when it was written in the Wra form. The settlement has belonged to the Uray family since ancient times. In 1646, Baron Ádám Károlyi was also a part-owner of Uranus. At the beginning of the 1900s, Count István Tisza, Bálint Uray and Baron Margit Uray owned property here.

The village was built entirely on the edge of the Ecsedi bog, which constantly threatened to be swallowed. The settlement was destroyed in the early 18th century due to the bog. From 1724 to 1800 it was barren and uninhabited.

Reformed Hungarians settled in the village again, and in the early 1800s they built their small wooden church, which was replaced by a new one in 1902. During the great flood of 1855, the whole village was submerged.

His Ura in the early 1900s was a small settlement of 68 houses with 610 inhabitants. It has 268 Reformed, 229 Greek Catholic, 48 Roman Catholic, and 60 Israeli residents.

== Economy ==
There are agricultural works in the settlement due to the location of the settlement.
