= Szakály =

- Pronunciation: Hungarian pronunciation: [ˈsɒkaːj]

Origin
- Language: Hungarian
- Meaning: Hungarian: szakáll "beard"
- Region of origin: Hungary

Other names
- Variant form: ?

Szakály is a Hungarian surname:

- Dénes Szakály (born 1988), Hungarian football player
- Péter Szakály (born 1986, Nagyatád), Hungarian football (midfielder) player

It can also refer to a village in Tolna County, Hungary.
