= Szulimán =

- Village (Falva)
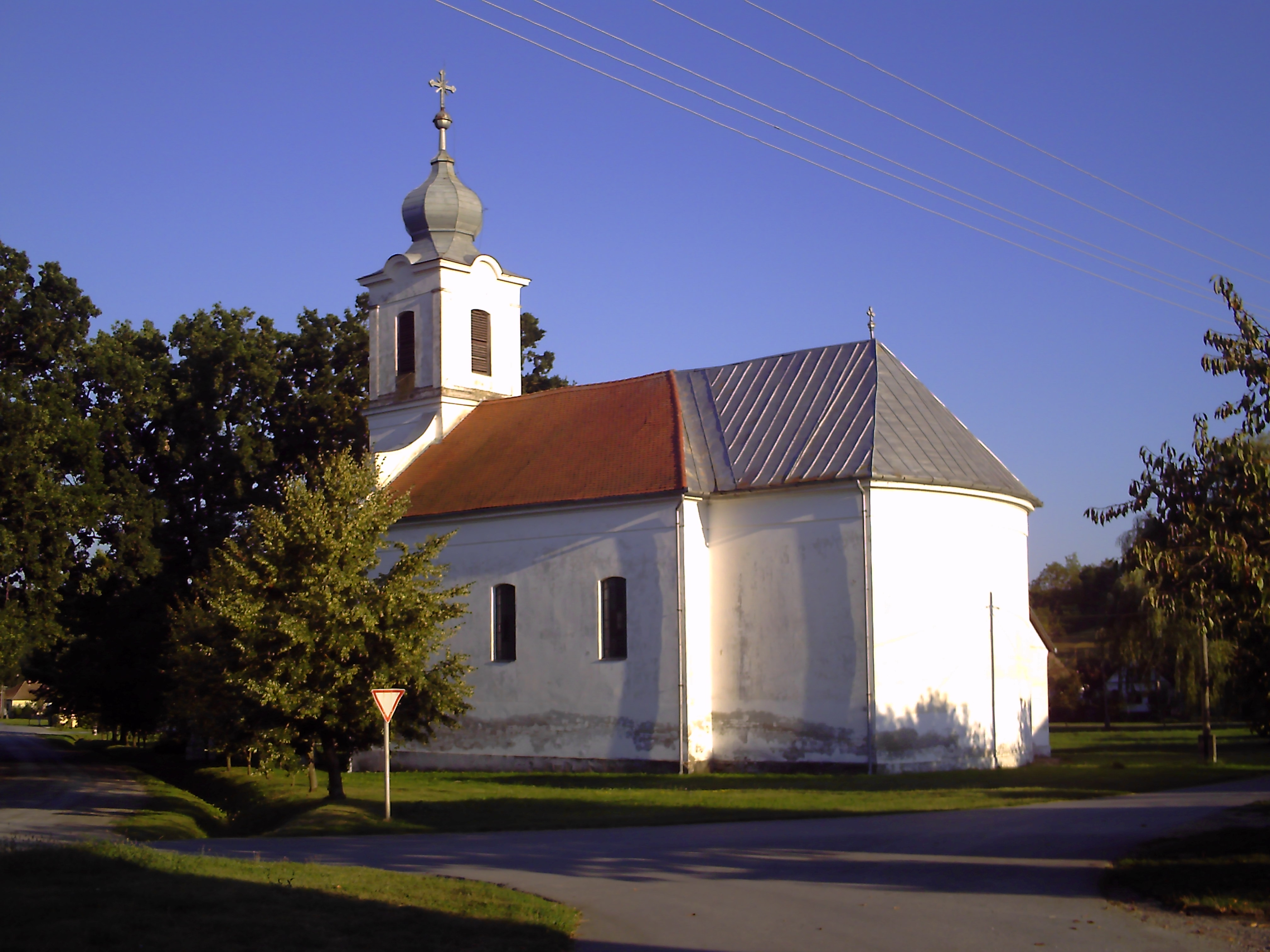
- Szulimán, templom, félhátulról

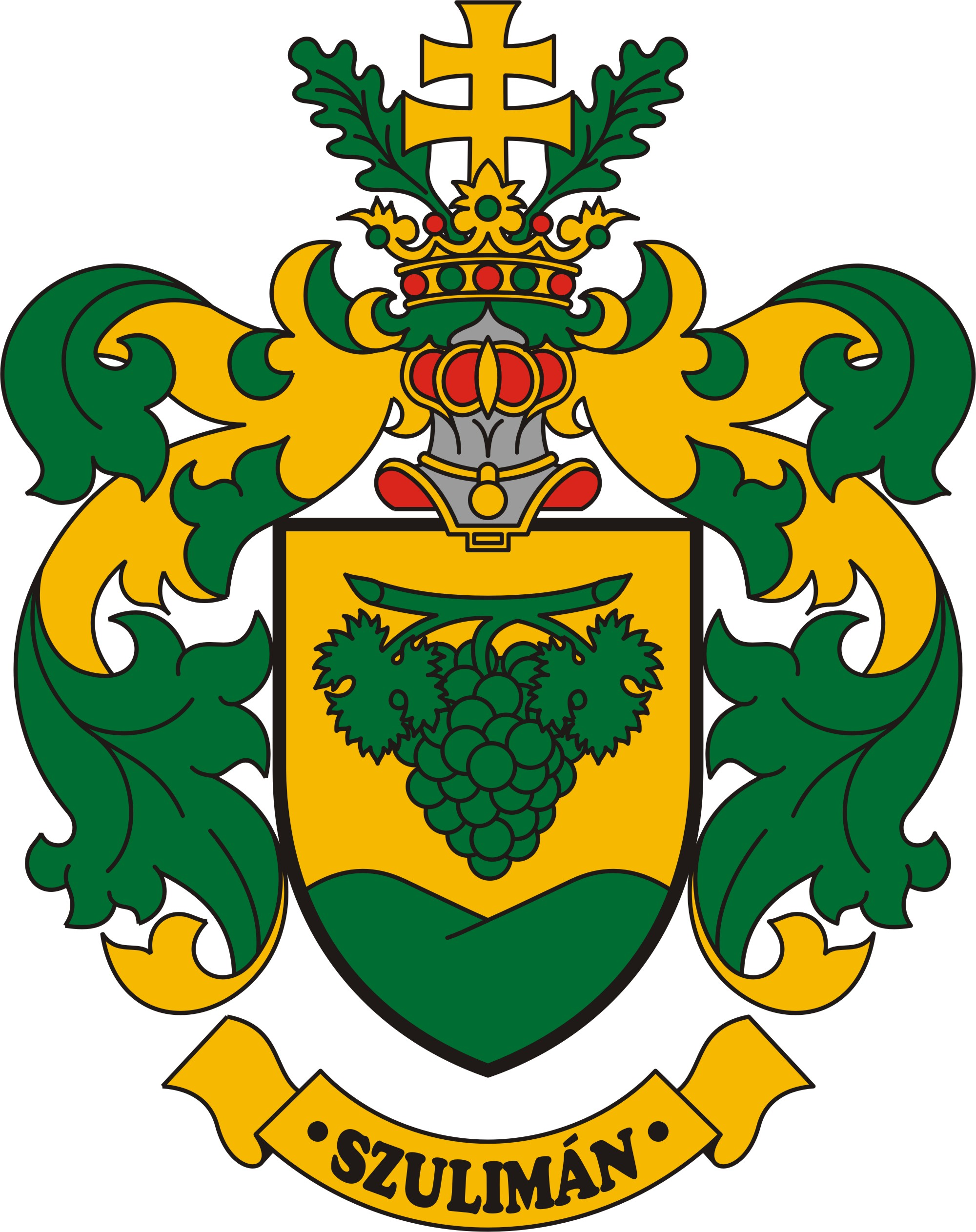
- Seal
- Interactive map of Szulimán
- Coordinates: 46°08′N 17°48′E
- Country: Hungary
- County: Baranya
- In the name Zelewmal: Early 15th century

Government
  - Mayor: István Bedő

Population
  - Total: 219
  - Density: 54.1/sq mi (20.88/km^{2})
- Time zone: UTC+1 (CET)
  - Summer (DST): UTC+2 (CEST)
- Postal code: 7932
- Area code: 73
- Website: Website

Szulimán is a village in Baranya county, Hungary.

== Location ==
Szulimán is in the Zselic, 10 km (6.2 mi) from Szigetvár, 1 km (0.62 mi) from main road 67th.

== History ==
Lot of people think that Szulimán was named after Suleiman the Magnificent, who died some miles from here, but the village original name is Szőlőmál, what means 'hill with grape'. The name was written first in the 15th century, as Zelewmal.
The village was the property of Bálint Török around 1500.
After the Turks get banished, Hungarians, and Croatians did come; from 1800 there are some Germans.
The village built a church, whats get offered to Saint George, but later, the new church gets offered to Saint Michael.
In 1950 there was a county-sorting project. The village with Szigetvár and some other village got annex to Somogy.

== Crest ==
Shield: Standing triangular shield in a gold field; cut with a green hill. Over that a bunch of grapes with two leaves.
Helmet: Decorated with gold, and padded with red, with red and green armorial.
Helmet ornament: A gold apostolic double cross, between two green oak leaves.
Helmet covers: In green and gold colors.
Sign: 'SZULIMÁN' sign, hanging under the crest.

== Monuments ==
- Roman Catholic church - sacred in 1890, and offered to Saint Michael.
