= Studená, Slovakia =

Municipality of Slovakia

Studená Medveshidegkút
- Municipality
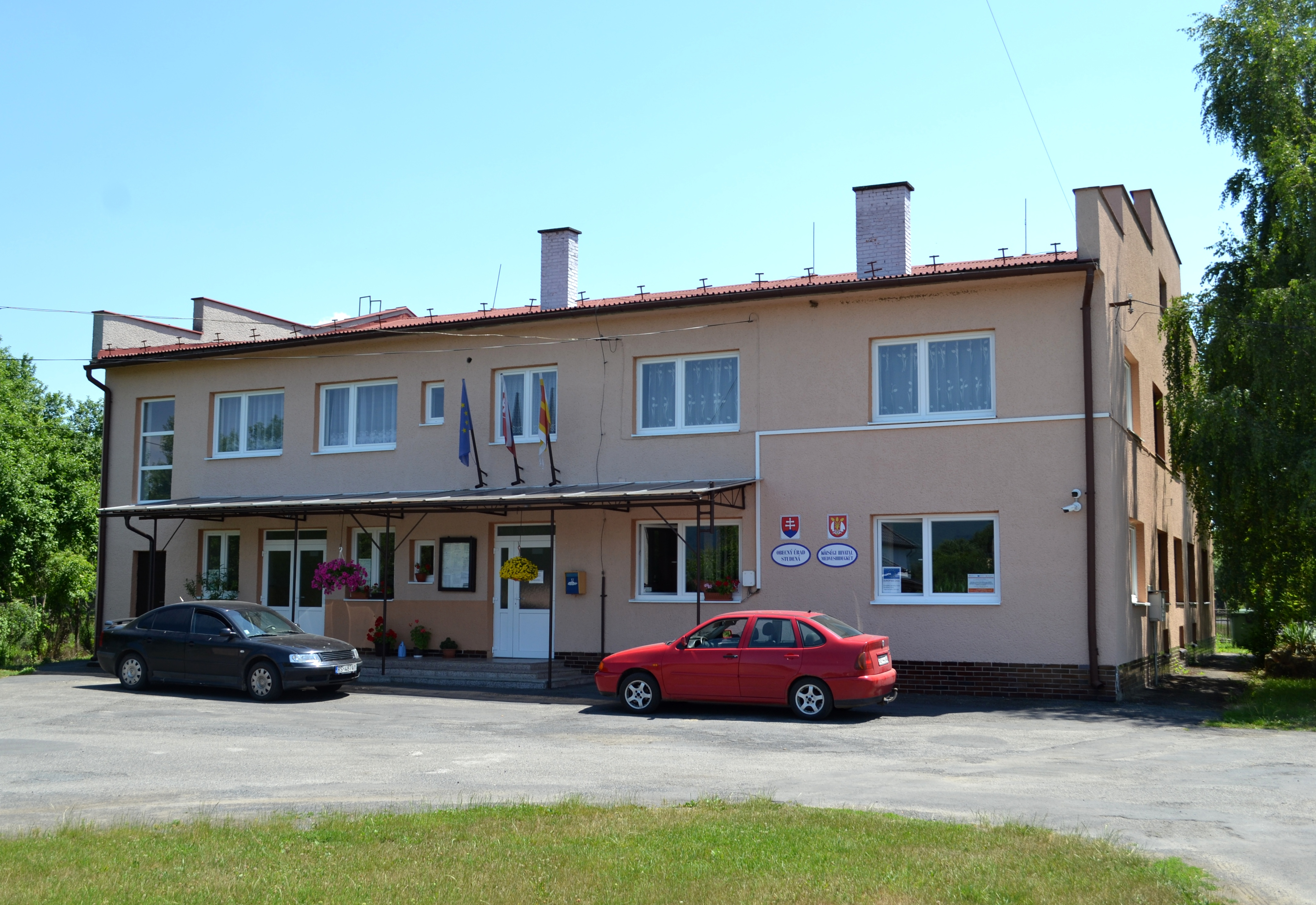

- Flag

- Location of Studená in the Banská Bystrica Region Location of Studená in Slovakia
- Coordinates: 48.17°N 19.97°E
- Country: Slovakia
- Region: Banská Bystrica Region
- District: Rimavská Sobota District
- First mentioned: 1304

Area
  - Total: 1.72 km^{2} (0.66 sq mi)
- Elevation: 261 m (856 ft)

Population (2025)
  - Total: 286
- Time zone: UTC+1 (CET)
  - Summer (DST): UTC+2 (CEST)
- Postal code: 980 34
- Area code: +421 47
- Vehicle registration plate (until 2022): RS
- Website: obecstudena.webnode.sk

Studená (Hungarian: Medveshidegkút) is a village and municipality in the Rimavská Sobota District of the Banská Bystrica Region of southern Slovakia.

== Geography ==
The municipality lies at an altitude of 261 metres (856 ft) and covers an area of 1.72 km^{2} (0.66 sq mi) (2025).

== Population ==
Population statistic (10 years)
Year	1995	2005	2015	2025
Count	292	274	275	286
Difference		−6.16%	+0.36%	+4%

Population statistic
Year	2024	2025
Count	280	286
Difference		+2.14%

It has a population of 286 people (31 December 2025).

=== Ethnicity ===
Census 2021 (1+ %)
Ethnicity	Number	Fraction
Hungarian	223	81.68%
Slovak	54	19.78%
Romani	22	8.05%
Not found out	5	1.83%
Total	273	

In year 2021 was 273 people by ethnicity 223 as Hungarian, 54 as Slovak, 22 as Romani, 5 as Not found out, 1 as Czech and 1 as Other.

Note on population: The difference values of population numbers in the table "Population statistic" and in the sections "Ethnicity" & "Religion" is caused by the use of various statistical methods.

=== Religion ===
Census 2021 (1+ %)
Religion	Number	Fraction
Roman Catholic Church	192	70.33%
None	58	21.25%
Calvinist Church	6	2.2%
Evangelical Church	6	2.2%
Jehovah's Witnesses	3	1.1%
Total	273	

In year 2021 was 273 people by religion 192 from Roman Catholic Church, 58 from None, 6 from Calvinist Church, 6 from Evangelical Church, 3 from Jehovah's Witnesses, 2 from Other and not ascertained christian church, 2 from Not found out, 2 from Seventh-day Adventist Church, 1 from Christian Congregations in Slovakia and 1 from Greek Catholic Church.
