= Szalapa =

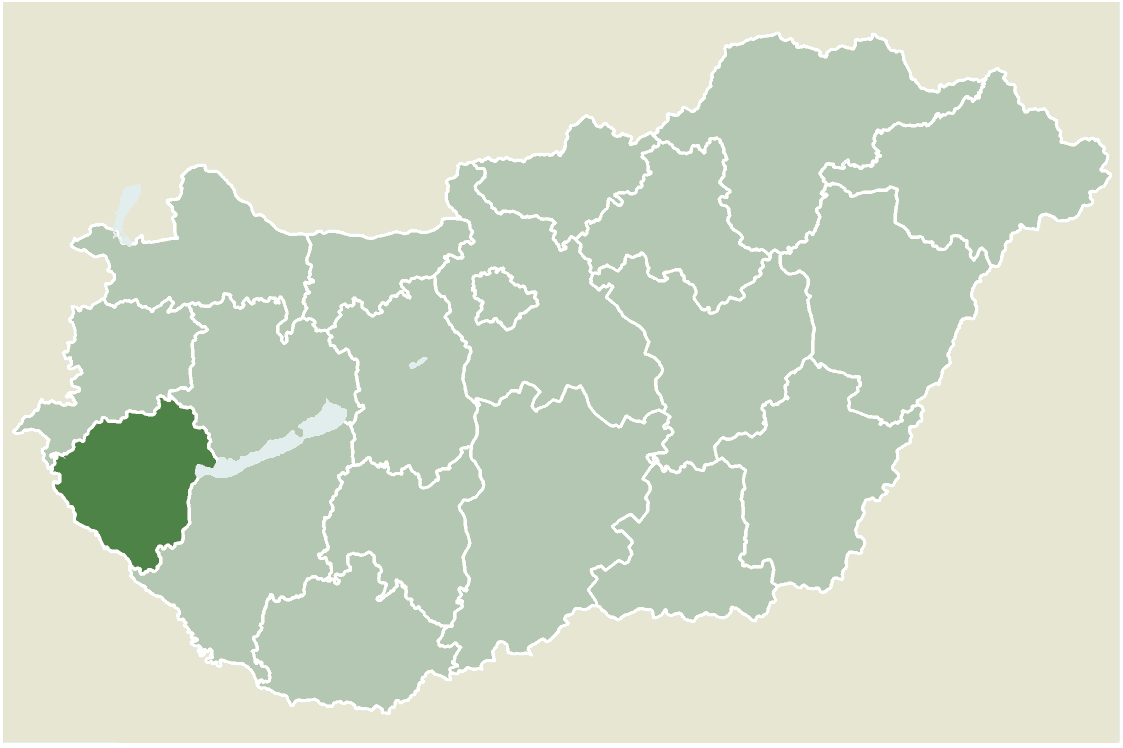
- Location of Zala county in Hungary

- Location of Szalapa
- Coordinates: 46.99235°N 17.14774°E
- Country: Hungary
- County: Zala

Area
  - Total: 4.52 km^{2} (1.75 sq mi)

Population (2004)
  - Total: 240
  - Density: 53.09/km^{2} (137.5/sq mi)
- Time zone: UTC+1 (CET)
  - Summer (DST): UTC+2 (CEST)
- Postal code: 8341
- Area code: 83

Szalapa is a village in Zala County, Hungary.
