= Csengersima =

- Village
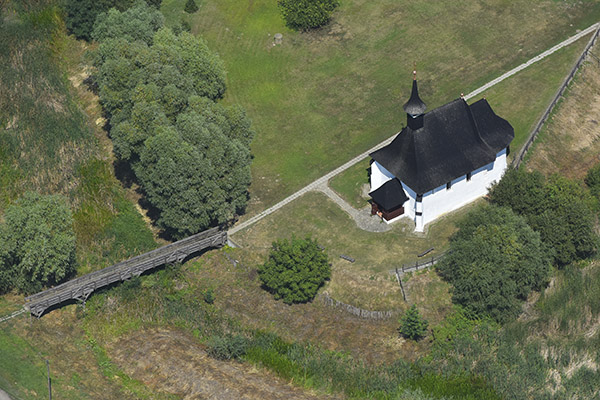
- Church from the Árpád Dynasty

- Coat of arms

- Location within Hungary
- Coordinates: 47°52′2″N 22°44′52″E
- Country: Hungary
- County: Szabolcs-Szatmár-Bereg

Area
  - Total: 23.8 km^{2} (9.2 sq mi)

Population (2001)
  - Total: 741
  - Density: 29.71/km^{2} (76.9/sq mi)
- Time zone: UTC+1 (CET)
  - Summer (DST): UTC+2 (CEST)
- Postal code: 4743
- Area code: 44

Csengersima is a village in Szabolcs-Szatmár-Bereg county, in the Northern Great Plain region of eastern Hungary.

== Geography ==
It covers an area of 23.8 km^{2} (9 sq mi) and has a population of 741 people (2001).

== Demographics ==
As of 2023, the village had a total population of 657. As of 2022, the town was 84.7% Hungarian, 6.9% Romanian, 3.8% Gypsy, and 1.4% of non-European origin. The remainder chose not to respond. The population was 44.8% Reformed, 10.8% Roman Catholic, and 5.2% Greek Catholic.

== Works cited ==
- Balogh J. (1939): A késő-gótikus és a renaissance-kor művészete. (The late-gothic and renaissance age art.) Magyar művelődéstörténet. 2. (Szerk. Domanovszky S.), Budapest
- Bérczi Sz, Bérczi Zs., Bérczi K. (2002): Kazettás mennyezetek. (Coffered ceilings.) Licium-Art, Debrecen
- Kelemen L. (1977): Művészettörténeti tanulmányok. (Studies in Art History.) Bukarest
- Tombor I. (1968): Magyarországi festett famennyezetek és rokonemlékek a XV-XIX. századból. (Painted Coffered Ceilings from Hungary from the 15-16th Century.) Akadémiai K. Budapest
