= Szőkedencs =

- Village
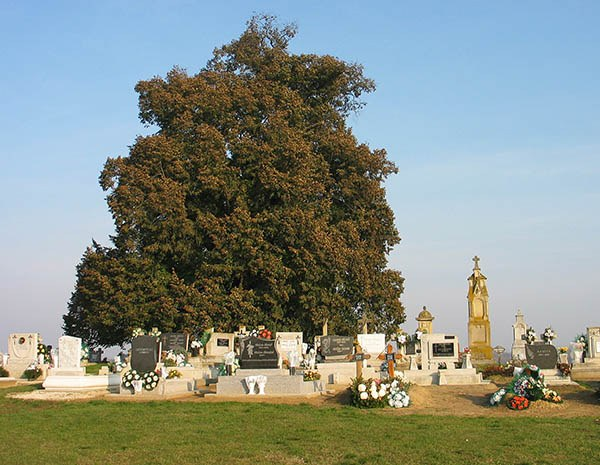
- Its 700 years old linden tree in the cemetery is a symbol of the village

- Coat of arms

- Location of Somogy county in Hungary

- Location of Szőkedencs
- Coordinates: 46.557869°N 17.24935°E
- Country: Hungary
- Region: Southern Transdanubia
- County: Somogy
- District: Marcali
- RC Diocese: Kaposvár

Area
  - Total: 18.69 km^{2} (7.22 sq mi)

Population (2017)
  - Total: 233
  - Density: 12.5/km^{2} (32.3/sq mi)
- Demonym(s): dencsi, szőkedencsi
- Time zone: UTC+1 (CET)
  - Summer (DST): UTC+2 (CEST)
- Postal code: 8736
- Area code: (+36) 85
- Motorways: M7
- Distance from Budapest: 189 km (117 mi) Northeast
- NUTS 3 code: HU232
- MP: József Attila Móring (KDNP)
- Website: Szőkedencs Online

Szőkedencs is a village in Somogy county, Hungary.
