= Zabar, Hungary =

Zabar
- Location of Zabar in Hungary
- Coordinates: 48.139°N 20.05°E
- Country: Hungary
- Region: Northern Hungary
- County: Nógrád
- Rank: Village

Area
  - Total: 18.17 km^{2} (7.02 sq mi)

Population (2009)
  - Total: 556
  - Density: 30.6/km^{2} (79.3/sq mi)
- Time zone: UTC+1 (CET)
  - Summer (DST): UTC+2 (CEST)
- Area code: +36 32
- KSH code: 21661

Zabar is a village in Nógrád county, Hungary.

== Geography ==
Zabar lies about 30 kilometres (19 mi) east of Salgótarján, where the borders of Nógrád, Borsod-Abaúj-Zemplén and Heves counties and Slovakia meet. The River Tarna (only a stream at this point) flows through the village. Kőverő-ér in the centre of the inner village is a small tributary to the Tarna.

The village has two physically separate parts, Belsőzabar ("Inner Zabar") and Külsőzabar ("Outer Zabar").

== History ==
The name Zabar is of Slavic origin and its meaning approximates to "a place behind the pine forest." This etymology is somewhat of a mystery as pine is not an indigenous species in the area. Its first mention in an official document dates from 1332 (as Latin: Sobur).

The village was abandoned during the Turkish occupation of the sixteenth and seventeenth centuries.

== Tourism ==
The surroundings make it an optimal destination for hiking and hunting. Most of the hills are covered with forest, although deforestation has recently intensified on privately owned lands. Beech, oak, acacia and planted pine species are the most common.

Between May and September the forests are abundant with several kinds of edible mushroom, which inhabitants take full advantage of. They eat them and also sell them, mostly for export to France and Italy, and many locals treat it as a pastime.

Zabar has the coldest mean winter temperatures of all Hungary. In the ten years since temperatures have been recorded the lowest value was −31.9 °C (−25.4 °F) on 12 January 2003. (Although this is 3 °C (5 °F) warmer than the all-time coldest temperature in Hungary.The lowest temperature on record is -35°C (-31°F) in Gorombolytapolca, set on February 16, 1940.

== Landmarks ==
- The 14th century Gothic church
- The manor, built in 1725.
