= Porcsalma =

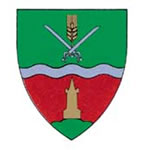
- Flag Coat of arms

- Location within Hungary
- Coordinates: 47°53′N 22°34′E
- Country: Hungary
- County: Szabolcs-Szatmár-Bereg

Area
  - Total: 31.10 km^{2} (12.01 sq mi)

Population (2015)
  - Total: 2,743
  - Density: 89.04/km^{2} (230.6/sq mi)
- Time zone: UTC+1 (CET)
  - Summer (DST): UTC+2 (CEST)
- Postal code: 4761
- Area code: 44

Porcsalma is a large village in Szabolcs-Szatmár-Bereg county, in the Northern Great Plain region of eastern Hungary.

== Geography ==
It covers an area of 31.10 km^{2} (12 sq mi) and has a population of 2743 people (2015).
