= Szentimrefalva =

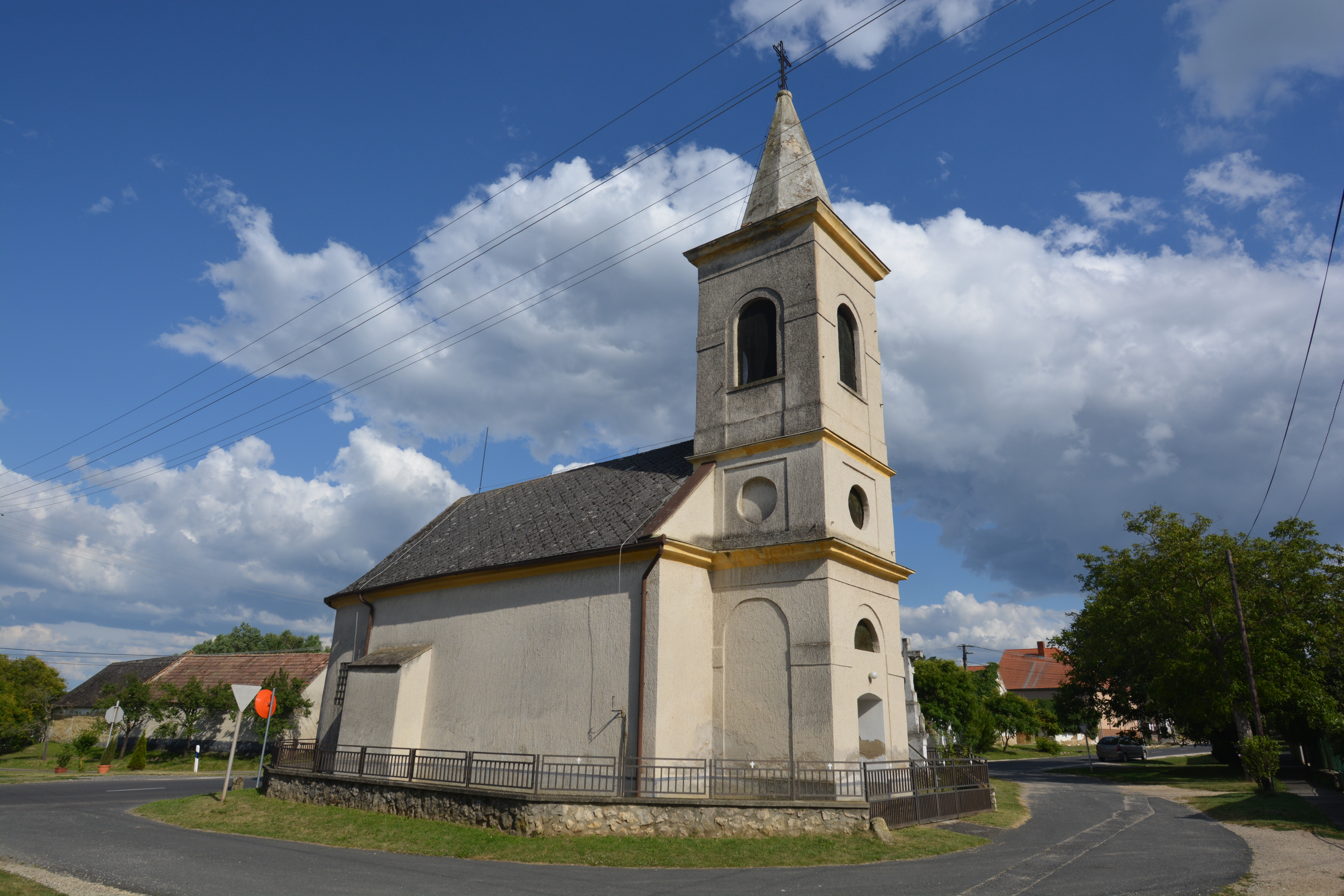

- Flag Coat of arms

- Location of Veszprém county in Hungary

- Location of Szentimrefalva
- Coordinates: 47.07377°N 17.28066°E
- Country: Hungary
- County: Veszprém

Government
  - Mayor: Bicskei Sandor (Ind.)

Area
  - Total: 10.87 km^{2} (4.20 sq mi)

Population (2022)
  - Total: 166
  - Density: 15.3/km^{2} (39.6/sq mi)
- Time zone: UTC+1 (CET)
  - Summer (DST): UTC+2 (CEST)
- Postal code: 8475
- Area code: 87

Szentimrefalva is a village in Veszprém county, Hungary.
