= Nová Bašta =

Municipality of Slovakia

Nová Bašta Újbást (Egyházasbást)
- Municipality
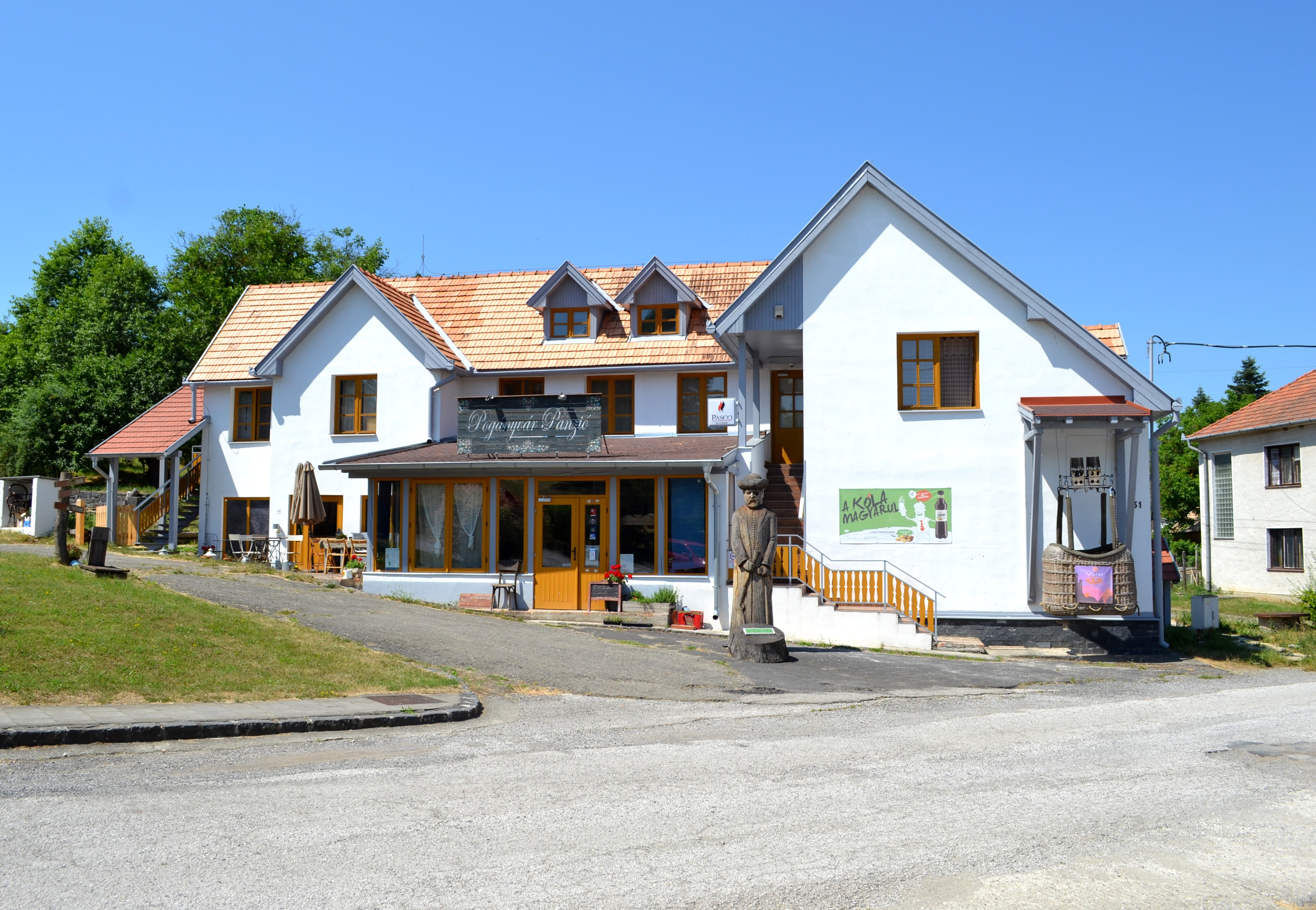

- Flag

- Location of Nová Bašta in the Banská Bystrica Region Location of Nová Bašta in Slovakia
- Coordinates: 48.17°N 19.94°E
- Country: Slovakia
- Region: Banská Bystrica Region
- District: Rimavská Sobota District
- First mentioned: 1267

Area
  - Total: 13.18 km^{2} (5.09 sq mi)
- Elevation: 271 m (889 ft)

Population (2025)
  - Total: 507
- Time zone: UTC+1 (CET)
  - Summer (DST): UTC+2 (CEST)
- Postal code: 980 34
- Area code: +421 47
- Vehicle registration plate (until 2022): RS
- Website: www.obecnovabasta.sk

Nová Bašta (Hungarian: Újbást (Egyházasbást)) is a village and municipality in the Rimavská Sobota District of the Banská Bystrica Region of southern Slovakia.

== Geography ==
The municipality lies at an altitude of 271 metres (889 ft) and covers an area of 13.18 km^{2} (5.09 sq mi) (2025).

== Population ==
Population statistic (10 years)
Year	1995	2005	2015	2025
Count	599	531	503	507
Difference		−11.35%	−5.27%	+0.79%

Population statistic
Year	2024	2025
Count	498	507
Difference		+1.80%

It has a population of 507 people (31 December 2025).

=== Ethnicity ===
Census 2021 (1+ %)
Ethnicity	Number	Fraction
Hungarian	397	82.19%
Romani	71	14.69%
Slovak	70	14.49%
Not found out	21	4.34%
Czech	10	2.07%
Total	483	

In year 2021 was 483 people by ethnicity 397 as Hungarian, 71 as Romani, 70 as Slovak, 21 as Not found out and 10 as Czech.

Note on population: The difference values of population numbers in the table "Population statistic" and in the sections "Ethnicity" & "Religion" is caused by the use of various statistical methods.

=== Religion ===
Census 2021 (1+ %)
Religion	Number	Fraction
Roman Catholic Church	389	80.54%
None	52	10.77%
Not found out	17	3.52%
Calvinist Church	10	2.07%
Greek Catholic Church	6	1.24%
Total	483	

In year 2021 was 483 people by religion 389 from Roman Catholic Church, 52 from None, 17 from Not found out, 10 from Calvinist Church, 6 from Greek Catholic Church, 2 from Other and not ascertained christian church, 2 from Christian Congregations in Slovakia, 2 from Evangelical Church, 1 from United Methodist Church, 1 from Buddhism and 1 from Ad hoc movements.
