= Tachty =

Municipality of Slovakia

Tachty Tajti
- Municipality
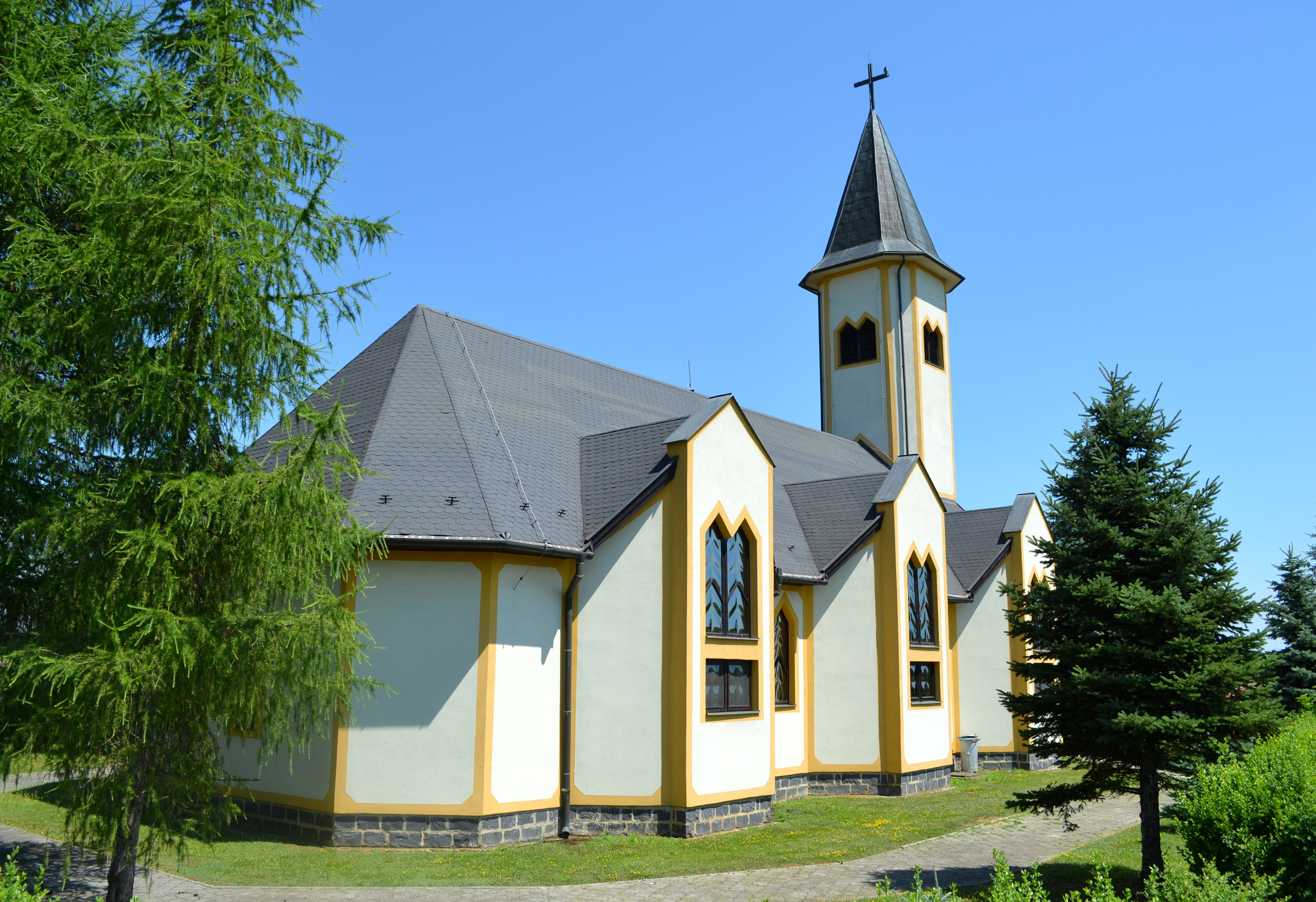

- Flag

- Location of Tachty in the Banská Bystrica Region Location of Tachty in Slovakia
- Coordinates: 48.15°N 19.95°E
- Country: Slovakia
- Region: Banská Bystrica Region
- District: Rimavská Sobota District
- First mentioned: 1391

Area
  - Total: 7.83 km^{2} (3.02 sq mi)
- Elevation: 270 m (890 ft)

Population (2025)
  - Total: 550
- Time zone: UTC+1 (CET)
  - Summer (DST): UTC+2 (CEST)
- Postal code: 980 34
- Area code: +421 47
- Vehicle registration plate (until 2022): RS
- Website: www.tachty.eu

Tachty (Hungarian: Tajti) is a village and municipality in the Rimavská Sobota District of the Banská Bystrica Region of southern Slovakia.

== History ==
The village was founded after the Mongol invasion around the church of St. Nicholas in the Church Tower in 1290. During the Turkish plundering, it was destroyed and depopulated. It was then part of the Kingdom of Hungary within the Austro-Hungarian Empire. The village was incorporated into the newly formed Czechoslovakia in 1918 following World War I, as ordered by the 1920 Treaty of Trianon. This status was briefly interrupted between 1938 and 1945, when Tachty was returned to Hungary under the terms of the First Vienna Award. Following the conclusion of World War II, the village was restored to Czechoslovakia, where it remained until the dissolution of the federation on January 1, 1993, at which point it became part of the independent Slovak Republic.

== Sights ==
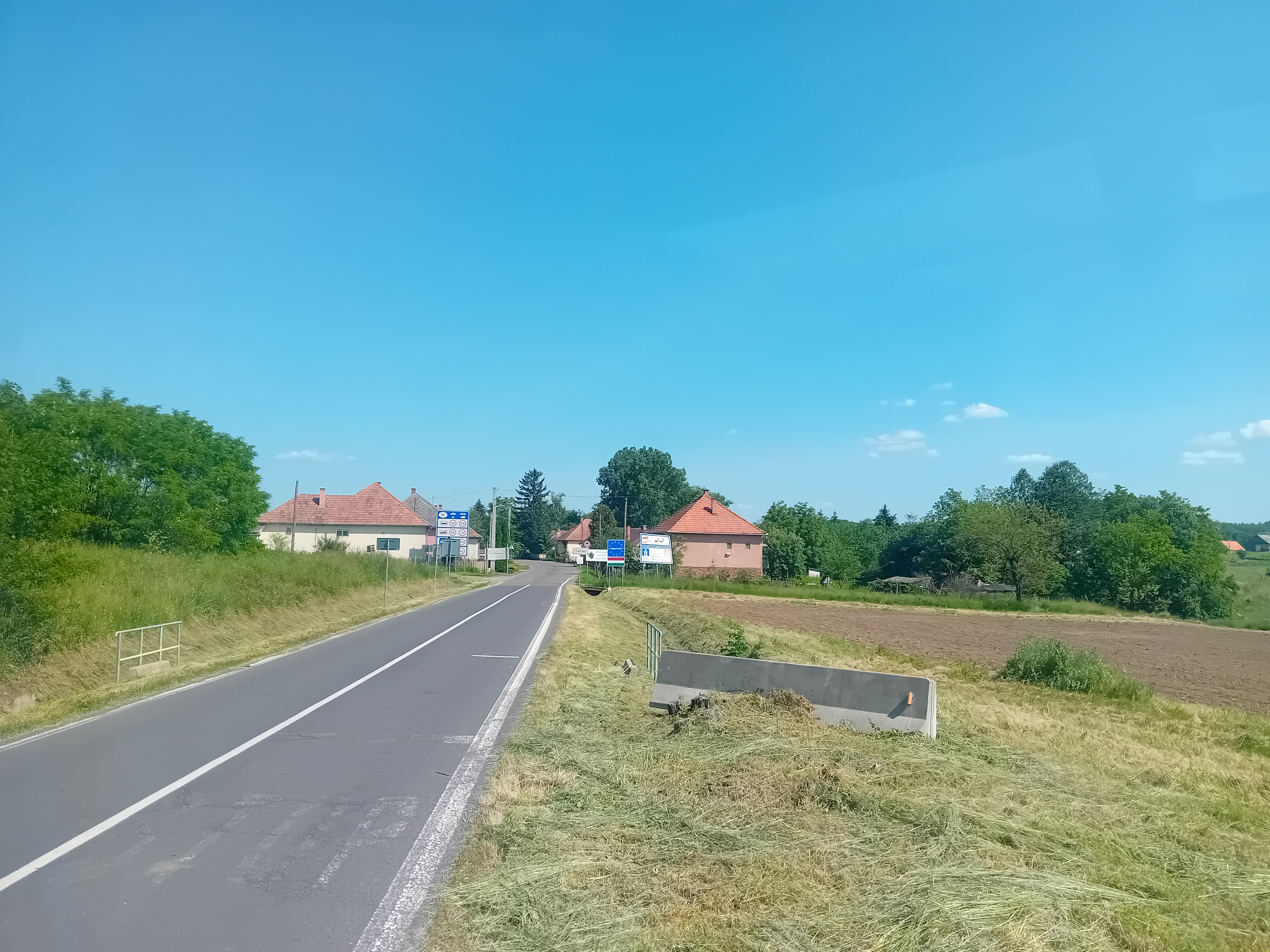
Tachty - Cered Border (Slovak Side)

The woodland and mounds around Tachty offer great cycling and hiking experiences. In 2017 an observation tower was built close to Tachty's lake offering sights of nearby Hungary, and Slovakia.

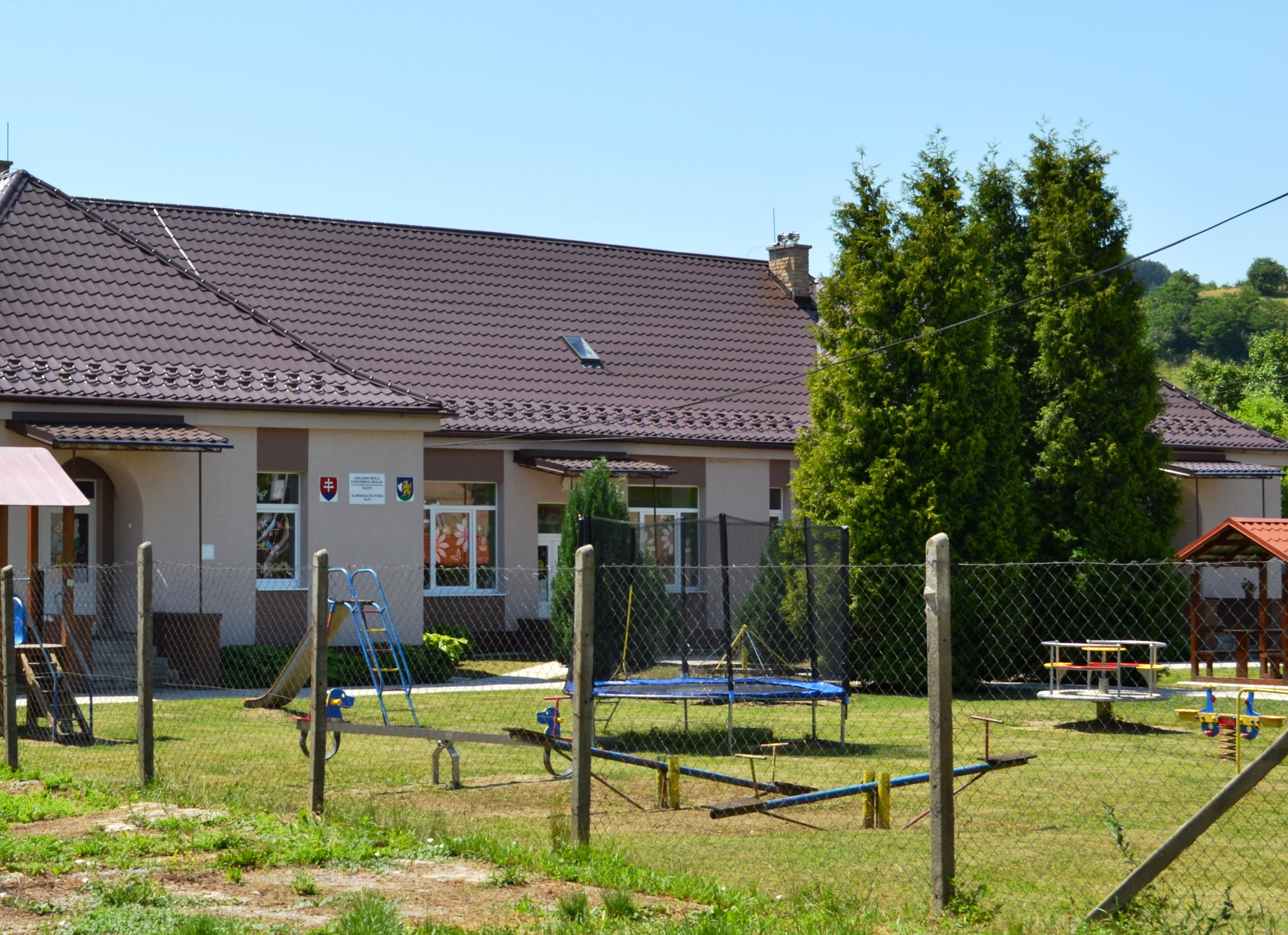
Tachty School

== Geography ==
The municipality lies at an altitude of 270 metres (890 ft) and covers an area of 7.83 km^{2} (3.02 sq mi) (2025). Tachty aso has a lake.

== Population ==
Population statistic (10 years)
Year	1995	2005	2015	2025
Count	596	550	532	550
Difference		−7.71%	−3.27%	+3.38%

Population statistic
Year	2024	2025
Count	543	550
Difference		+1.28%

It has a population of 550 people (31 December 2025).

=== Ethnicity ===
Census 2021 (1+ %)
Ethnicity	Number	Fraction
Hungarian	493	89.96%
Slovak	73	13.32%
Not found out	18	3.28%
Romani	9	1.64%
Total	548	

In year 2021 was 548 people by ethnicity 493 as Hungarian, 73 as Slovak, 18 as Not found out and 9 as Romani.

Note on population: The difference values of population numbers in the table "Population statistic" and in the sections "Ethnicity" & "Religion" is caused by the use of various statistical methods.

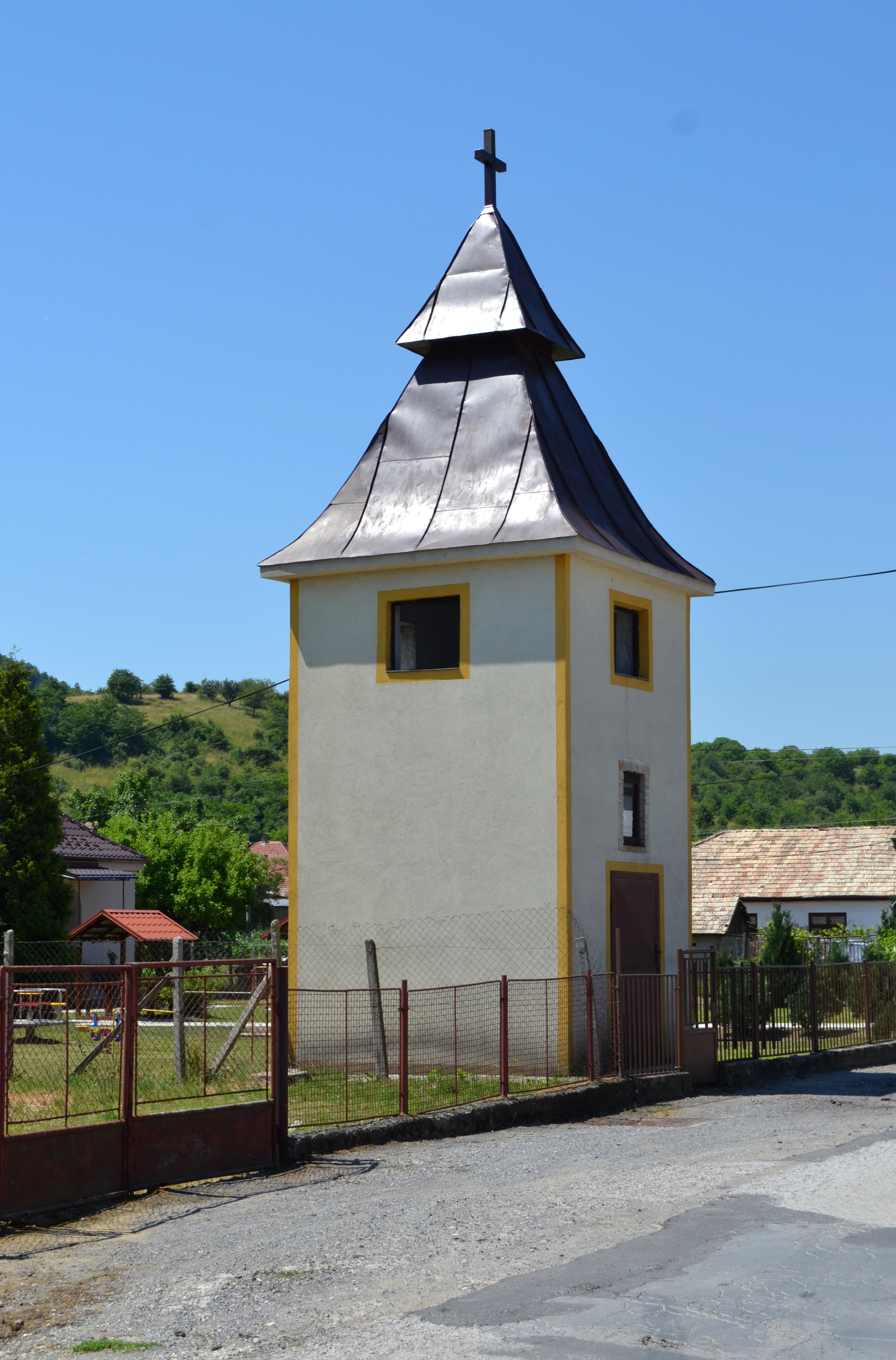
Tachty Bell Tower

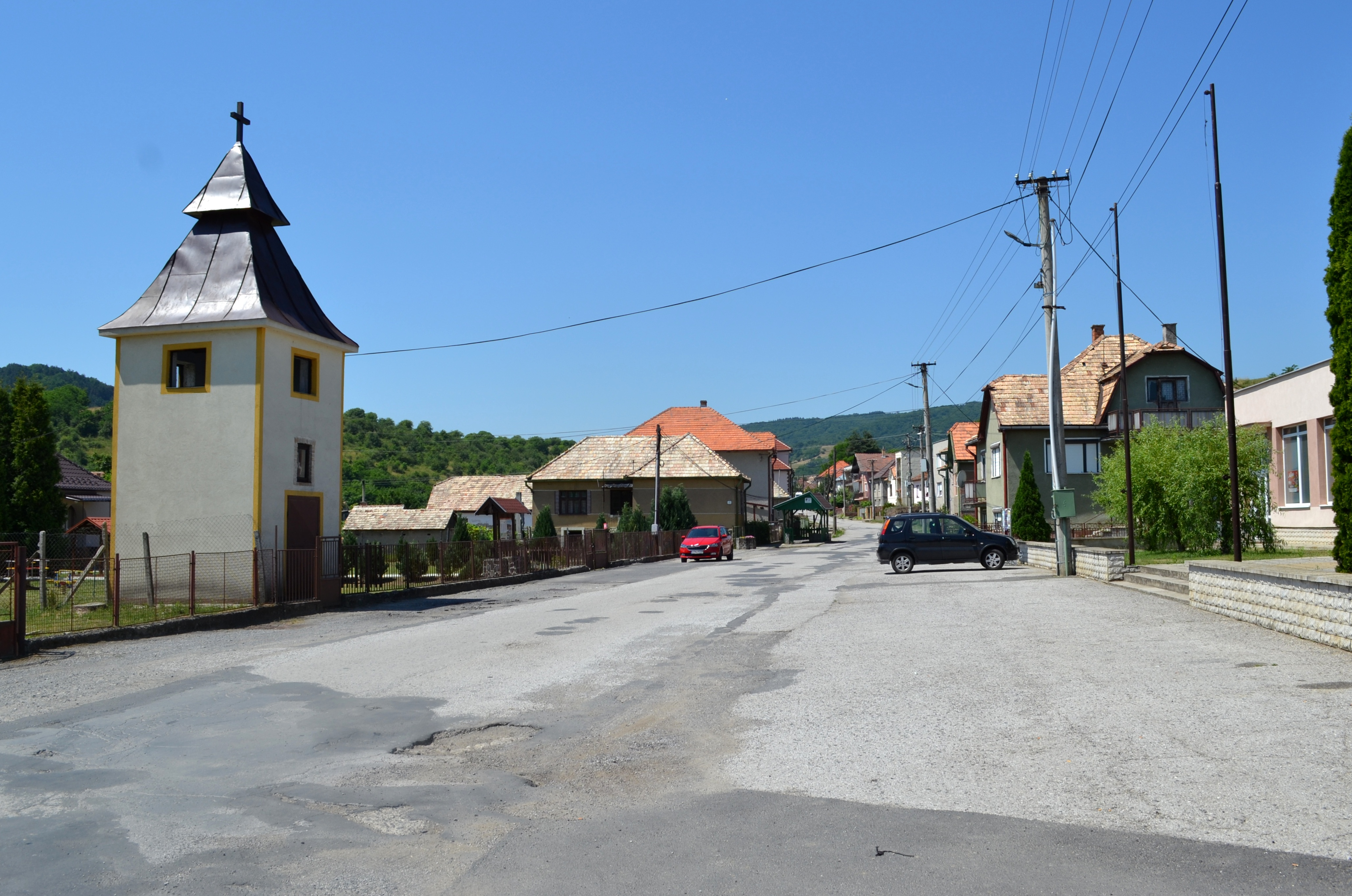
Main Road in Tachty

Census 2021 (1+ %)
Religion	Number	Fraction
Roman Catholic Church	460	83.94%
None	55	10.04%
Calvinist Church	10	1.82%
Not found out	9	1.64%
Total	548	

In year 2021 was 548 people by religion 460 from Roman Catholic Church, 55 from None, 10 from Calvinist Church, 9 from Not found out, 5 from Greek Catholic Church, 4 from Evangelical Church, 2 from Other and not ascertained christian church, 2 from Jehovah's Witnesses and 1 from Other.
