= Szamostatárfalva =

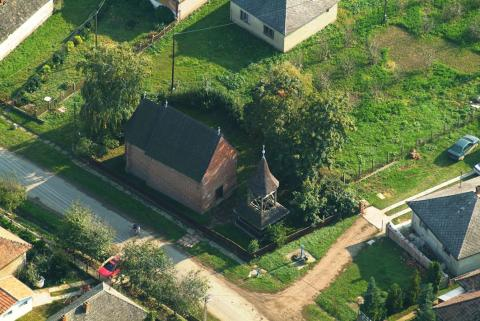
- Szamostatárfalva, wooden belfry from above

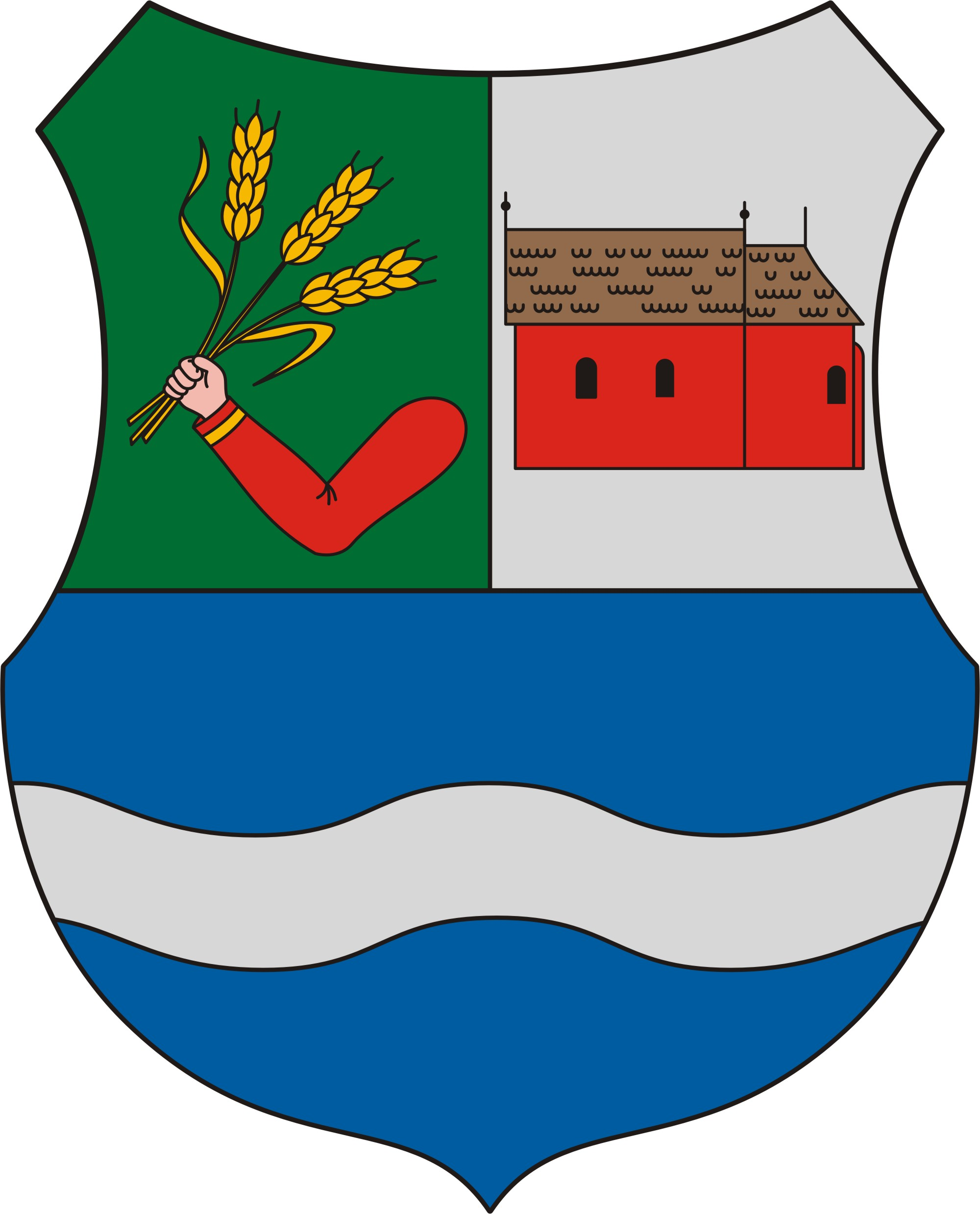
- Coat of arms

- Location of Szamostatárfalva in Hungary
- Coordinates: 47.874432°N 22.665437°E
- Country: Hungary
- Region: Northern Great Plain
- County: Szabolcs-Szatmár-Bereg

Area
  - Total: 4.50 km^{2} (1.74 sq mi)

Population (2015)
  - Total: 309
  - Density: 68.7/km^{2} (178/sq mi)
- Time zone: UTC+1 (CET)
  - Summer (DST): UTC+2 (CEST)
- Postal code: 4746
- Area code: +36 44
- Website: http://szamostatarfalva.hu/

Szamostatárfalva is a village in Szabolcs-Szatmár-Bereg county, in the Northern Great Plain region of eastern Hungary.

== Geography ==
It covers an area of 4.5 km^{2} (2 sq mi) and has a population of 309 people (2015).
