= Szamosangyalos =

Coordinates: 47°52′N 22°40′E

- Interactive map of Szamosangyalos
- Country: Hungary
- County: Szabolcs-Szatmár-Bereg

Area
  - Total: 8.1 km^{2} (3.1 sq mi)

Population (2015)
  - Total: 460
  - Density: 57.2/km^{2} (148/sq mi)
- Time zone: UTC+1 (CET)
  - Summer (DST): UTC+2 (CEST)
- Postal code: 4767
- Area code: 44

Location of Szabolcs-Szatmar-Bereg county in Hungary

Szamosangyalos is a village in Szabolcs-Szatmár-Bereg county, in the Northern Great Plain region of eastern Hungary.

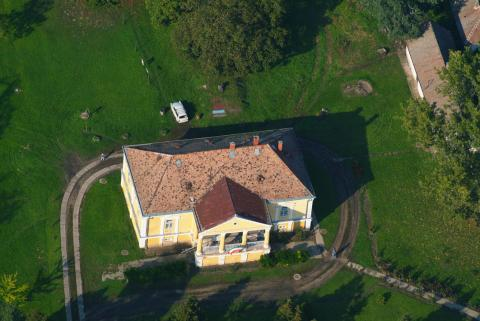
Szamosangyalos, palace from above

== Geography ==
It covers an area of 8.1 km^{2} (3 sq mi) and has a population of 460 people (2015).
