= Szilaspogony =

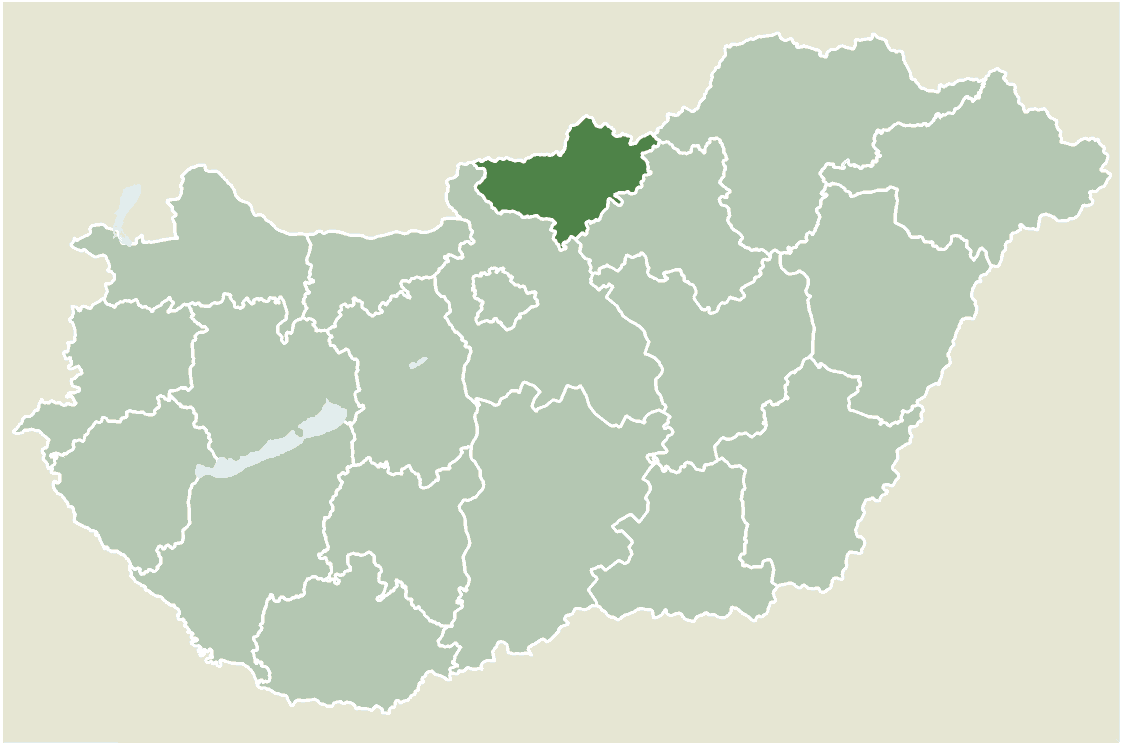
- Location of Nógrád county in Hungary

- Location of Szilaspogony
- Coordinates: 48.11596°N 20.01835°E
- Country: Hungary
- County: Nógrád

Area
  - Total: 14.4 km^{2} (5.6 sq mi)

Population (2004)
  - Total: 391
  - Density: 27.15/km^{2} (70.3/sq mi)
- Time zone: UTC+1 (CET)
  - Summer (DST): UTC+2 (CEST)
- Postal code: 3125
- Area code: 32

Szilaspogony is a village in Nógrád county, Hungary.
