= Szamosbecs =

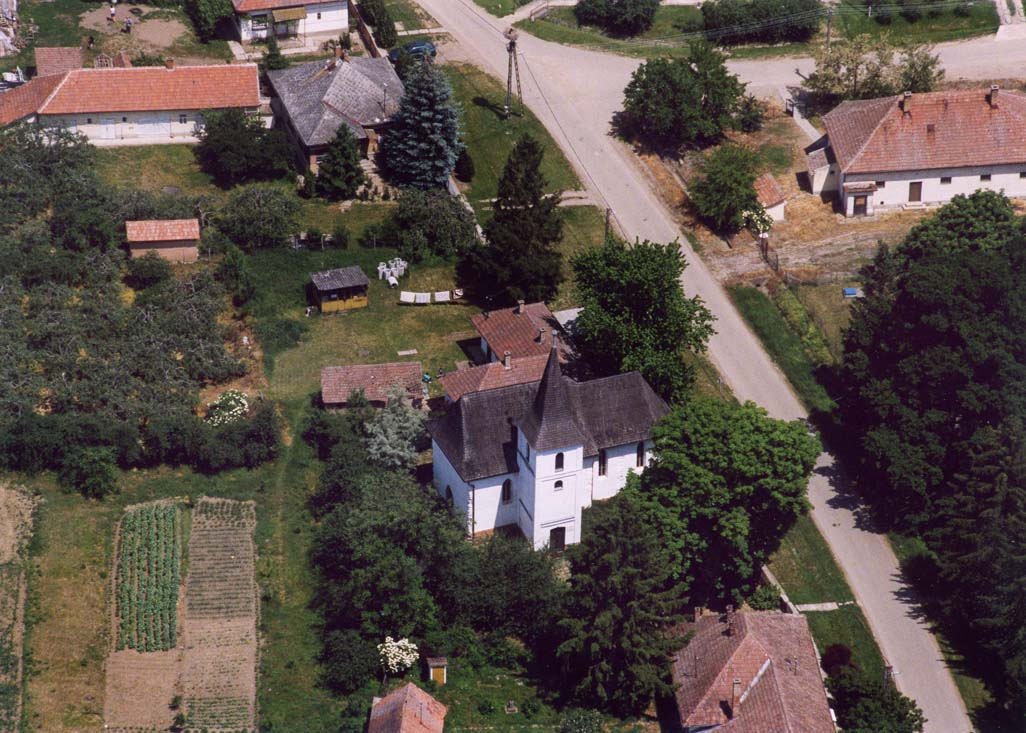

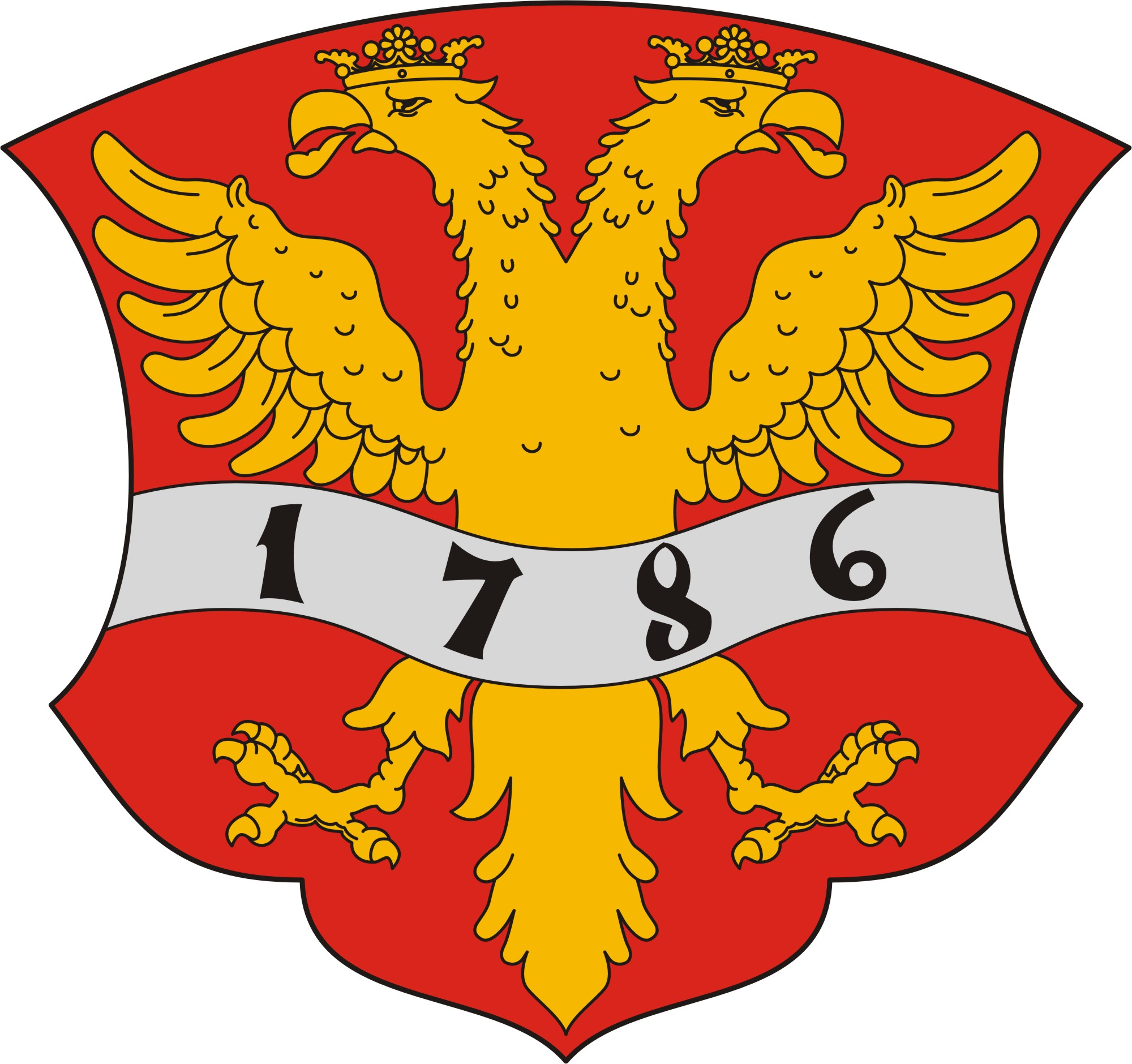
- Coat of arms

- Location of Szamosbecs in Hungary
- Coordinates: 47.8619185°N 22.6898728°E
- Country: Hungary
- Region: Northern Great Plain
- County: Szabolcs-Szatmár-Bereg

Area
  - Total: 6.71 km^{2} (2.59 sq mi)
- Elevation: 98 m (322 ft)

Population (2015)
  - Total: 378
  - Density: 56.3/km^{2} (146/sq mi)
- Time zone: UTC+1 (CET)
  - Summer (DST): UTC+2 (CEST)
- Postal code: 4745
- Area code: +36 44
- Website: http://szamosbecs.hu/

Szamosbecs is a village in Szabolcs-Szatmár-Bereg county, in the Northern Great Plain region of eastern Hungary.

== Geography ==
It covers an area of 6.71 km^{2} (3 sq mi) and has a population of 378 people (2015).
