= Hajdú-Bihar County 4th constituency =

Constituency in Hungary (2012-)

Hajdú-Bihar County 4th constituency (Berettyóújfalu)
- Constituency for the National Assembly
- Location of Hajdú-Bihar county 04 within Hajdú-Bihar county

- Location of Hajdú-Bihar county within Hungary
- County: Hajdú-Bihar
- Electorate: 67,882 (2018)
- Major settlements: Berettyóújfalu

Current constituency
- Created: 2011
- Party: Fidesz–KDNP
- Member: István Vitányi
- Elected: 2014, 2018, 2022, 2026

The 4th constituency of Hajdú-Bihar County (Hungarian: Hajdú-Bihar megyei 04. számú országgyűlési egyéni választókerület) is one of the single member constituencies of the National Assembly, the national legislature of Hungary. The constituency standard abbreviation: Hajdú-Bihar 04. OEVK.

Since 2026, it has been represented by István Vitányi of the Fidesz–KDNP party alliance.

== Geography ==
The 4th constituency is located in south-eastern part of Hajdú-Bihar County.

=== List of municipalities ===
The constituency includes the following municipalities:

1. Ártánd
2. Bakonszeg
3. Bedő
4. Berekböszörmény
5. Berettyóújfalu
6. Bihardancsháza
7. Biharkeresztes
8. Biharnagybajom
9. Bihartorda
10. Bojt
11. Csökmő
12. Darvas
13. Derecske
14. Esztár
15. Furta
16. Gáborján
17. Hajdúbagos
18. Hencida
19. Hosszúpályi
20. Kismarja
21. Komádi
22. Konyár
23. Körösszakál
24. Körösszegapáti
25. Magyarhomorog
26. Mezőpeterd
27. Mikepércs
28. Mezősas
29. Monostorpályi
30. Nagykereki
31. Nagyrábé
32. Pocsaj
33. Sáp
34. Sáránd
35. Szentpéterszeg
36. Tépe
37. Told
38. Újiráz
39. Váncsod
40. Vekerd
41. Zsáka

== Members ==
The constituency was first represented by István Vitányi of the Fidesz from 2014, and he was re-elected in 2018, 2022, and 2026.

Election	Member	Party	%	Ref.
2014	István Vitányi	Fidesz	47.18	
2018	István Vitányi	Fidesz	55.09	
2022	István Vitányi	Fidesz	61.66	
2026	István Vitányi	Fidesz	47.82	
