= List of settlements in Hungary by ethnic Romanian population =

This list contains Hungarian settlements in which ethnic Romanians make up over 1% of the total population, according to the 2022 census, ordered by their percentage of the local population.

According to the 2022 census, there are 27,554 Romanians in Hungary, who form at least 5% of the population in 23 settlements.

In localities where Romanians make up more than 10% of the population, the Romanian language can be used by the local administration.

Absolute Romanian majority; Romanian language has a special status in local administration
10–50% Romanians; Romanian language has a special status in local administration
Under 10% Romanians; Romanian language without special status in local administration

Settlement	Romanian name	County	Population	Romanian population
Méhkerék	Micherechi	Békés	1,903	65.3%
Bedő	Bedeu	Hajdú-Bihar	269	46.8%
Pusztaottlaka	Otlaca-Pustă	Békés	297	25.2%
Kétegyháza	Chitighaz	Békés	3,343	15.0%
Nagylak	Nădlac	Csongrád-Csanád	387	13.7%
Körösszakál	Săcal	Hajdú-Bihar	687	13.5%
Körösszegapáti	Apateu	Hajdú-Bihar	829	12.8%
Mezőpeterd	Peterd	Hajdú-Bihar	524	12.5%
Battonya	Bătania	Békés	4,999	12.2%
Újszalonta	–	Békés	97	10.5%
Körösnagyharsány	–	Békés	445	10.3%
Magyarcsanád	Cenadul Unguresc	Csongrád-Csanád	1,256	9.8%
Bojt	–	Hajdú-Bihar	485	8.8%
Királyhegyes	–	Csongrád-Csanád	602	8.0%
Biharkeresztes	–	Hajdú-Bihar	3,876	7.8%
Mezősas	Pusta Cărmăjdului	Hajdú-Bihar	603	7.3%
Csengersima	–	Szabolcs-Szatmár-Bereg	653	6.9%
Lőkösháza	Leucușhaz	Békés	1,526	6.5%
Szamosbecs	–	Szabolcs-Szatmár-Bereg	308	6.5%
Dombegyház	Dâmbighaz	Békés	1,646	6.0%
Komlódtótfalu		Szabolcs-Szatmár-Bereg	104	5.5%
Elek	Aletea	Békés	4,300	5.2%
Magyardombegyház	–	Békés	162	5.0%
Csegöld	Cigled	Szabolcs-Szatmár-Bereg	626	4.8%
Csanádpalota	–	Csongrád-Csanád	2,534	4.8%
Nagykereki	–	Hajdú-Bihar	1,110	4.7%
Vállaj	–	Szabolcs-Szatmár-Bereg	916	4.7%
Kisdombegyház	–	Békés	391	4.6%
Biharugra	–	Békés	744	4.3%
Pocsaj	Pocei	Hajdú-Bihar	2,512	4.3%
Szamostatárfalva	–	Szabolcs-Szatmár-Bereg	306	4.1%
Pátyod	–	Szabolcs-Szatmár-Bereg	590	3.9%
Váncsod	–	Hajdú-Bihar	1,031	3.7%
Told	–	Hajdú-Bihar	302	3.6%
Kötegyán	Cheteghian	Békés	1,208	3.4%
Berekböszörmény	–	Hajdú-Bihar	1,677	3.3%
Dombiratos	–	Békés	462	3.1%
Gyula	Jula	Békés	28,336	2.9%
Sarkadkeresztúr	Crâstor	Békés	1,339	2.4%
Kismarja	Chișmaria	Hajdú-Bihar	1,121	2.4%
Apátfalva	Patfal	Csongrád-Csanád	2,829	2.4%
Potyond	–	Győr-Moson-Sopron	92	2.2%
Bokor	–	Nógrád	93	2.2%
Furta	–	Hajdú-Bihar	1,141	2.2%
Hencida	–	Hajdú-Bihar	1,115	2.2%
Vekerd	Vecherd	Hajdú-Bihar	109	2.0%
Csanádalberti	–	Csongrád-Csanád	444	2.0%
Forráskút	–	Csongrád-Csanád	2,018	2.0%
Szamosangyalos	–	Szabolcs-Szatmár-Bereg	500	1.8%
Zajta	–	Szabolcs-Szatmár-Bereg	400	1.8%
Kevermes	–	Békés	1,651	1.7%
Csengerújfalu	Uifalău	Szabolcs-Szatmár-Bereg	718	1.6%
Darvas	Darvaş	Hajdú-Bihar	472	1.5%
Szamosújlak	–	Szabolcs-Szatmár-Bereg	358	1.5%
Ura	–	Szabolcs-Szatmár-Bereg	528	1.5%
Nagybánhegyes	–	Békés	1,072	1.3%
Mezőkovácsháza	Căuăcihaz	Békés	5,356	1.3%
Medgyesbodzás	Boziaș	Békés	902	1.3%
Tésa	–	Pest	91	1.3%
Bihardancsháza	–	Hajdú-Bihar	147	1.3%
Újiráz	–	Hajdú-Bihar	458	1.3%
Szamossályi	–	Szabolcs-Szatmár-Bereg	613	1.3%
Balástya	–	Csongrád-Csanád	3,151	1.3%
Bakonybánk	–	Komárom-Esztergom	399	1.2%
Gacsály	–	Szabolcs-Szatmár-Bereg	848	1.2%
Sarkad	Șărcad	Békés	9,252	1.1%
Tápióbicske	–	Pest	3,594	1.1%
Klárafalva	–	Csongrád-Csanád	466	1.1%
Rábcakapi	–	Győr-Moson-Sopron	165	1.1%
Végegyháza	–	Békés	1,137	1.1%
Hetefejércse	–	Szabolcs-Szatmár-Bereg	285	1.1%
Csenger	Cinghir	Szabolcs-Szatmár-Bereg	4,464	1.0%
Mérk	–	Szabolcs-Szatmár-Bereg	1,955	1.0%
Porcsalma	–	Szabolcs-Szatmár-Bereg	2,578	1.0%
Létavértes	Leta Mare	Hajdú-Bihar	6,853	1.0%
Okány	–	Békés	2,169	1.0%
Nyársapát	–	Pest	2,085	1.0%
Ferencszállás	–	Csongrád-Csanád	607	1.0%
Dunakiliti	–	Győr-Moson-Sopron	2,200	1.0%
Egyed	–	Győr-Moson-Sopron	490	1.0%
Szilsárkány	–	Győr-Moson-Sopron	675	1.0%
Németbánya	–	Veszprém	111	1.0%
