= Berettyóújfalu District =

Coordinates: 47.1500°N 21.5667°E

Berettyóújfalu District Berettyóújfalui járás
- Districts of Hungary
- Coat of arms

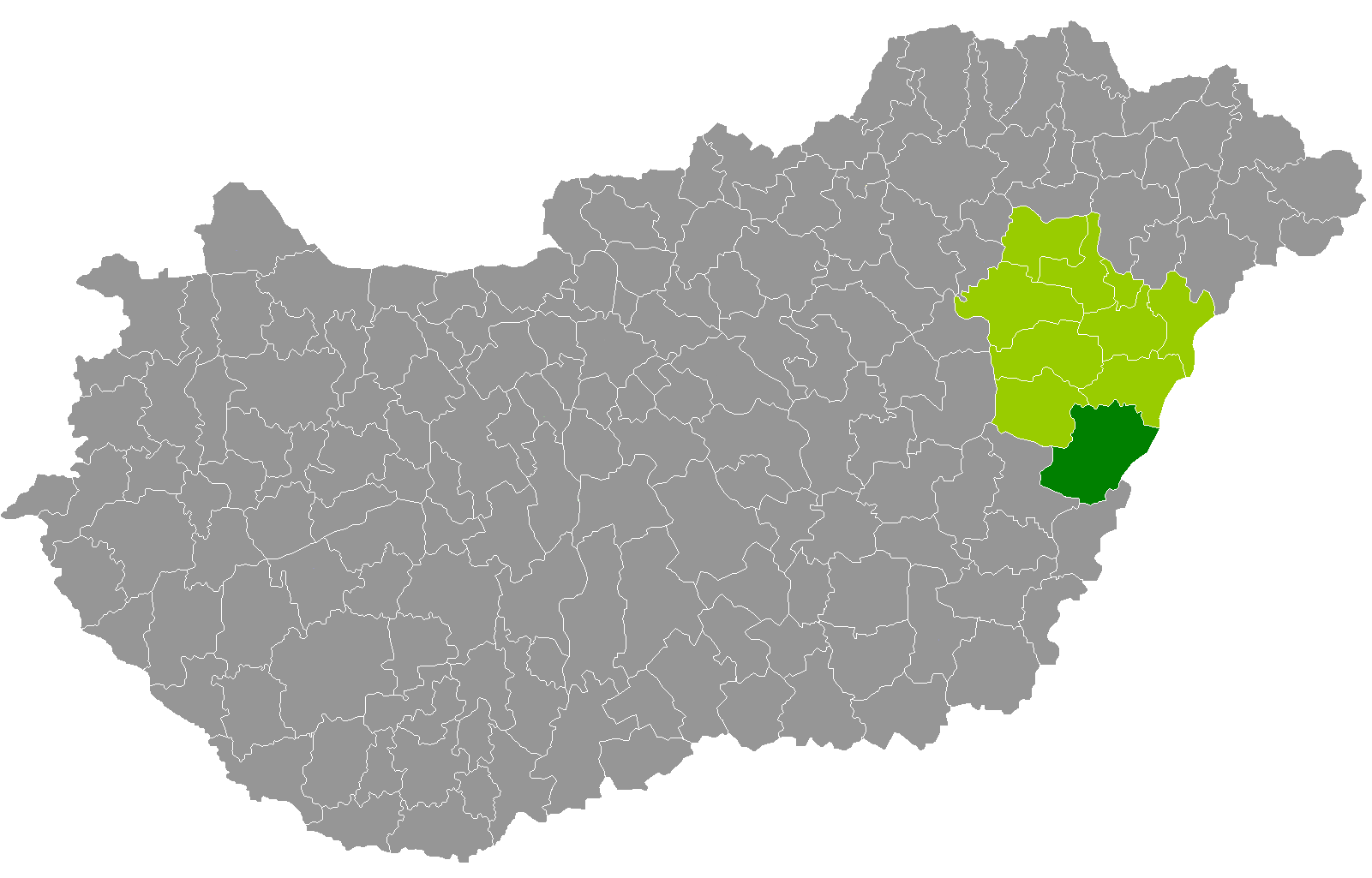
- Berettyóújfalu District within Hungary and Hajdú-Bihar County.
- Country: Hungary
- County: Hajdú-Bihar
- District seat: Berettyóújfalu

Area
  - Total: 1,073.90 km^{2} (414.64 sq mi)
  - Rank: 1st in Hajdú-Bihar

Population (2011 census)
  - Total: 44,995
  - Rank: 2nd in Hajdú-Bihar
  - Density: 42/km^{2} (110/sq mi)

Berettyóújfalu (Hungarian: Berettyóújfalui járás) is a district in south-eastern part of Hajdú-Bihar County. Berettyóújfalu is also the name of the town where the district seat is found. The district is located in the Northern Great Plain Statistical Region. This district is a part of Bihar historical and geographical region.

== Geography ==
Berettyóújfalu District borders with Derecske District to the north, the Romanian county of Bihor to the east, Sarkad District (Békés County) to the south, Szeghalom District (Békés County) and Püspökladány District to the west. The number of the inhabited places in Berettyóújfalu District is 25.

== Municipalities ==
The district has 3 towns, 2 large villages and 20 villages. (ordered by population, as of 1 January 2012)

- Ártánd (502)
- Bakonszeg (1,160)
- Bedő (252)
- Berekböszörmény (1,749)
- **Berettyóújfalu** (15,167) – district seat
- **Biharkeresztes** (4,149)
- Bojt (489)
- Csökmő (1,756)
- Darvas (527)
- Furta (1,136)
- Gáborján (876)
- Hencida (1,275)
- **Komádi** (5,172)
- Körösszakál (814)
- Körösszegapáti (882)
- Magyarhomorog (868)
- Mezőpeterd (533)
- Mezősas (591)
- Nagykereki (1,205)
- Szentpéterszeg (1,101)
- Told (310)
- Újiráz (505)
- Váncsod (1,221)
- Vekerd (112)
- Zsáka (1,544)

The bolded municipalities are cities, italics municipalities are large villages.

== Demographics ==
Religion in Berettyóújfalu District (2011 census)
1. Calvinism (43.1%)
2. Lutheranism (0.20%)
3. Catholic Church (6.60%)
4. Greek Catholicism (1.10%)
5. Orthodoxy (1.40%)
6. Other religions (1.50%)
7. Non-religious (21.6%)
8. Atheists (0.60%)
9. Undeclared (23.9%)

In 2011, it had a population of 44,995 and the population density was 36/km².

| Year | County population | Change |
|---|---|---|
| 2011 | 44,995 | n/a |

=== Ethnicity ===
Besides the Hungarian majority, the main minorities are the Roma (approx. 3,000), Romanian (1,000) and German (200).

Total population (2011 census): 44,995
Ethnic groups (2011 census): Identified themselves: 42,143 persons:

- Hungarians: 38,009 (90.19%)
- Romani: 2,694 (6.39%)
- Romanians: 1,111 (2.64%)
- Others and indefinable: 329 (0.78%)

Approx. 3,000 persons in Berettyóújfalu District did not declare their ethnic group at the 2011 census.

=== Religion ===
Religious adherence in the county according to 2011 census:

- Reformed – 19,399;
- Catholic – 3,480 (Roman Catholic – 2,996; Greek Catholic – 484);
- Orthodox – 618;
- Evangelical – 86;
- other religions – 675;
- Non-religious – 9,703;
- Atheism – 262;
- Undeclared – 10,772.

== Gallery ==
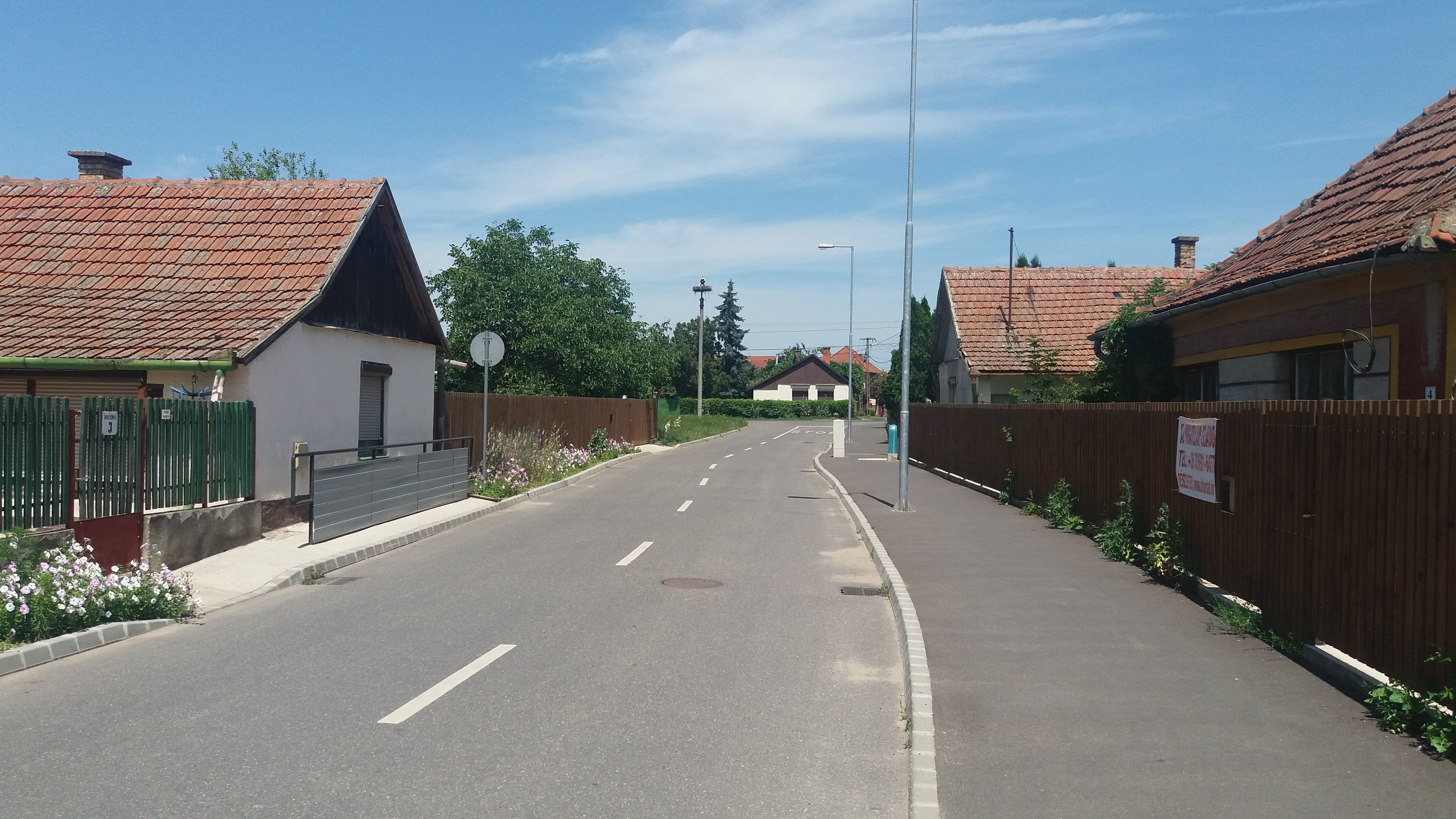
Berettyóújfalu, the district seat

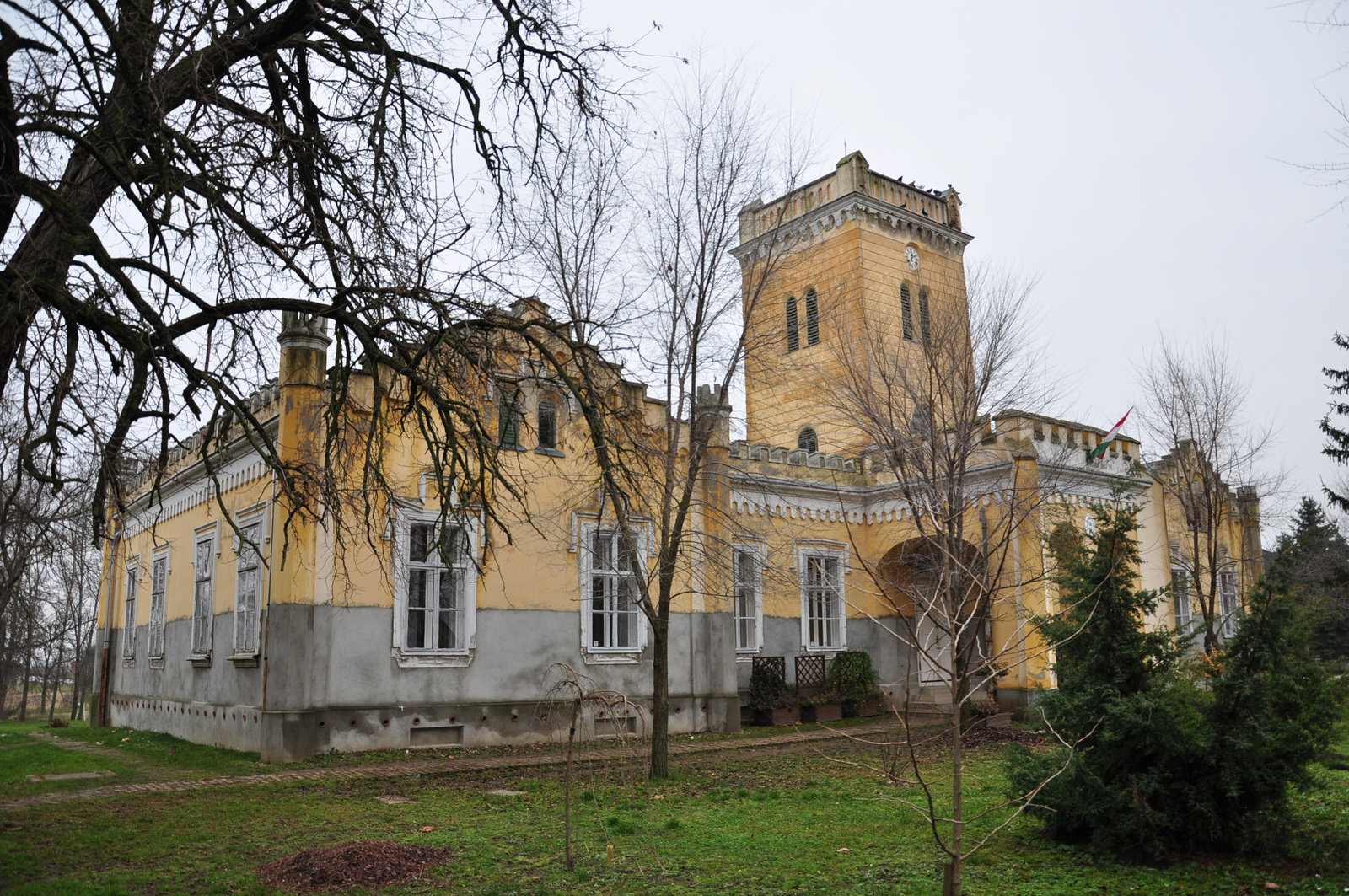
Rédely Mansion in Zsáka

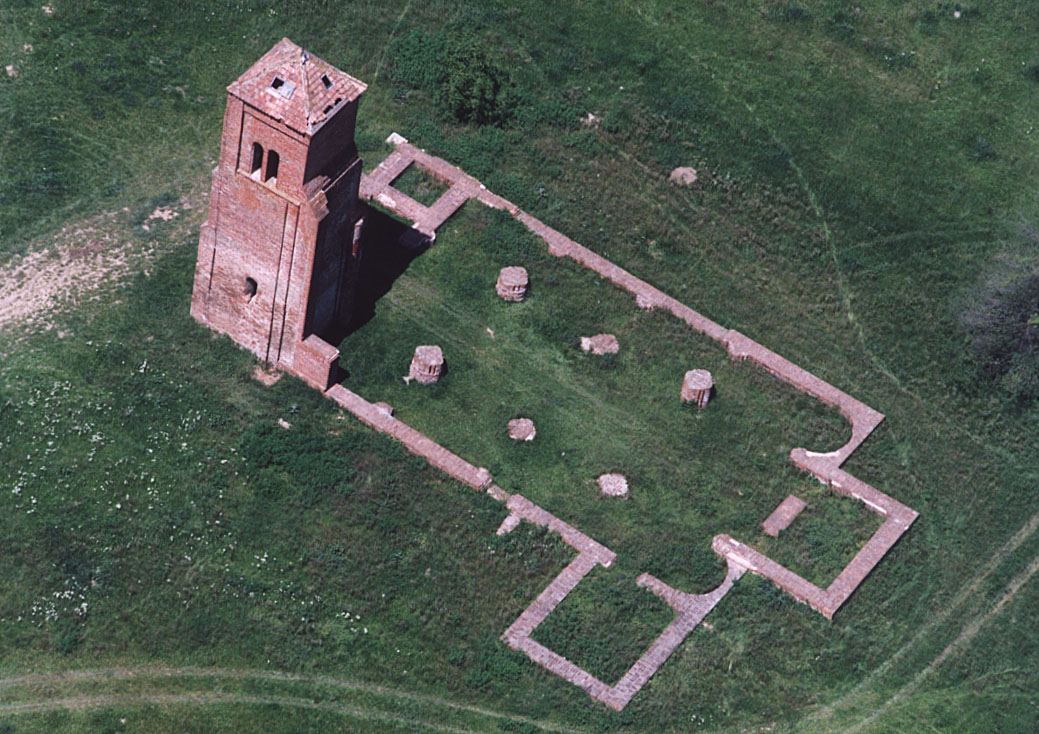
Csonkatorony from above (Herpály)

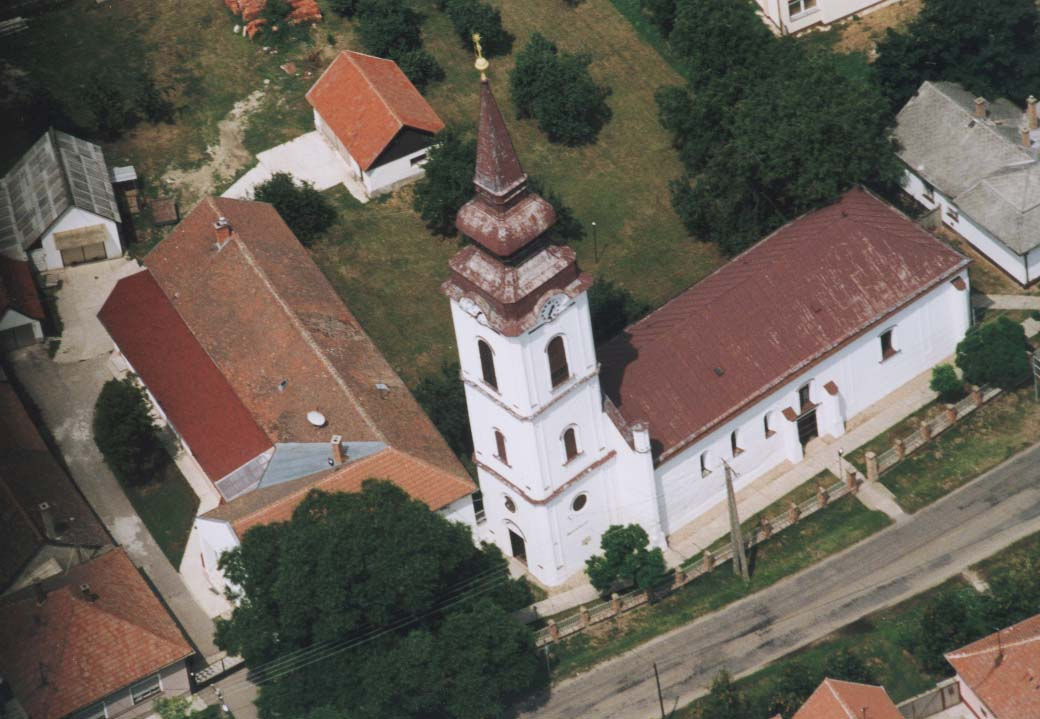
Reformed Church in Biharkeresztes

== See also ==
- List of cities and towns of Hungary
