= Romanians in Hungary =

Romanian: Românii din Ungaria Hungarian: Magyarországi románok
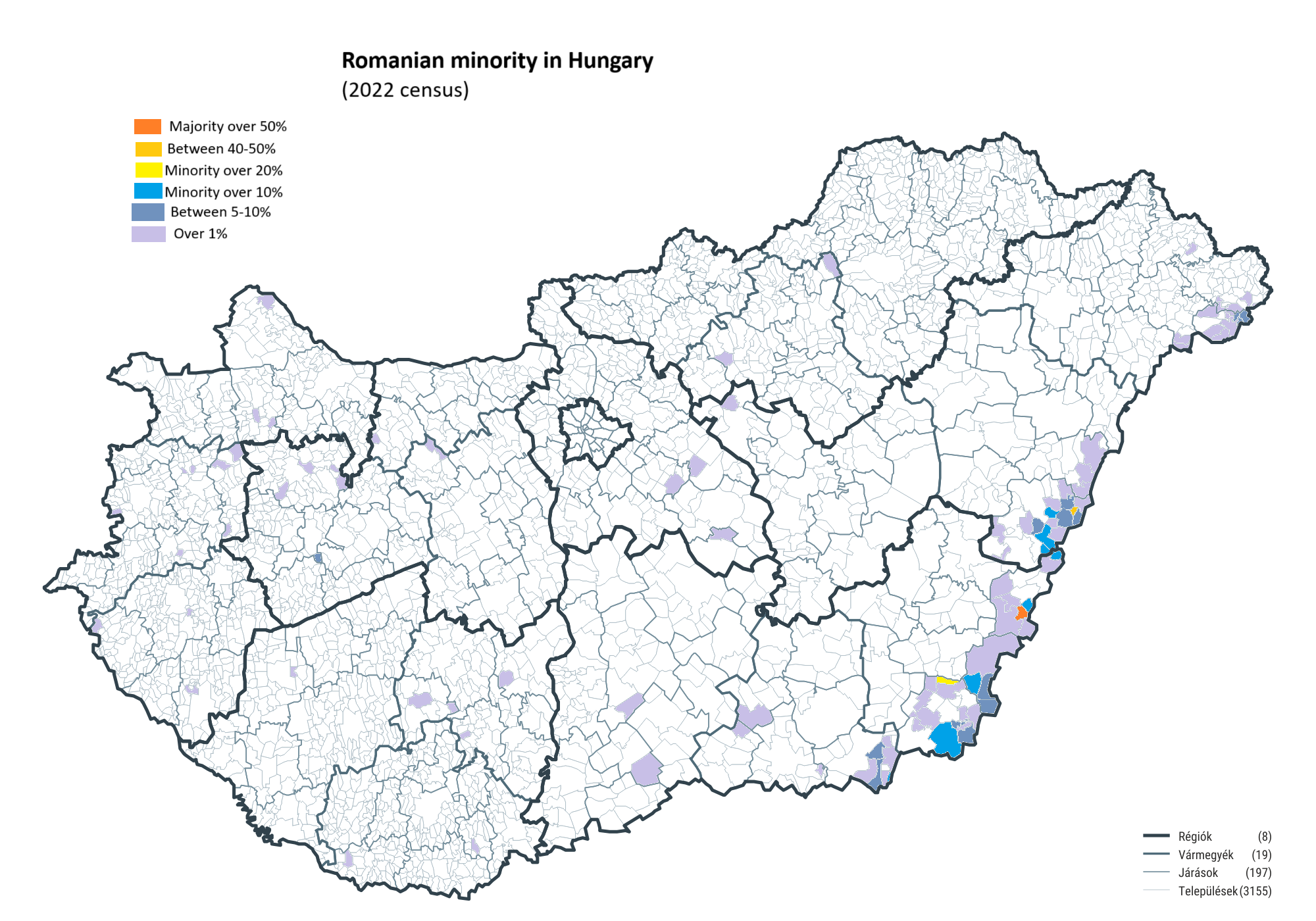
- Map of the Romanians in Hungary according to the 2022 Hungarian census

Total population
- 35,641

Regions with significant populations
- Budapest: 6,189
- Békés County: 5,137
- Pest County: 4,000
- Hajdú-Bihar County: 2,000
- Csongrád County: 1,500
- Heves County: 500
- Jász-Nagykun-Szolnok County: 500

Languages
- Hungarian, Romanian

Religion
- Romanian Orthodox Church, Roman Catholicism, Lutheranism

Related ethnic groups
- Romanians

The Romanians in Hungary (Romanian: Românii din Ungaria, Hungarian: Magyarországi románok) constituted a small minority. According to the most recent Hungarian census of 2011 (based on self-reporting), the population of Romanians was 35,641 or 0.3%, a significant increase from 8,482 or 0.1% of 2001. The community is concentrated in towns and villages close to the Romanian border, such as Battonya, Elek, Kétegyháza, Pusztaottlaka and Méhkerék, and in the city of Gyula. Romanians also live in the Hungarian capital, Budapest. As of 2011, Romanians constitute one of the largest communities in the country.

== History ==
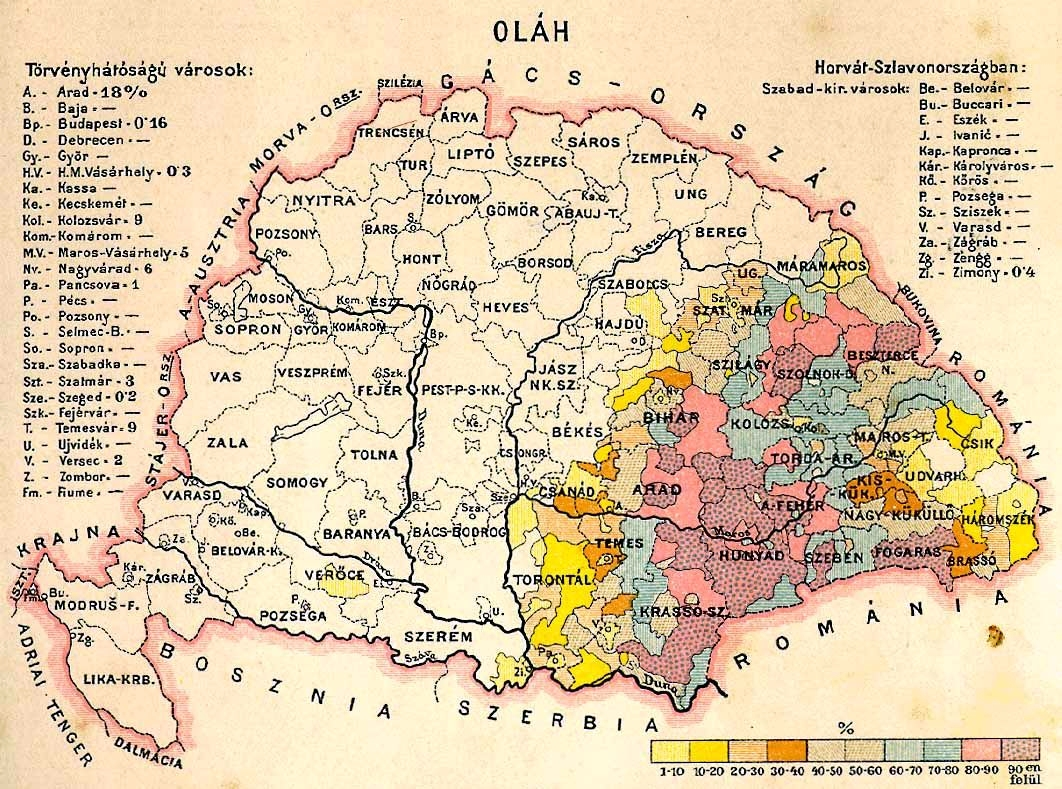
Romanians in Hungary according to 1890 Census

Historically, a significant part of modern-day Romania was part of the Kingdom of Hungary. The oldest extant documents from Transylvania make reference to Vlachs too. Regardless of the subject of Romanian presence/non-presence in Transylvania prior to the Hungarian conquest (See Origin of the Romanians), the first written sources about Romanian settlements derive from the 13th century, record was written about Olahteluk village in Bihar county from 1283. The 'land of Romanians', Terram Blacorum (1222,1280) showed up in Fogaras and this area was mentioned under different name (Olachi) in 1285. The first appearance of a supposed Romanian name 'Ola' in Hungary derives from a charter (1258). They were significant population in Transylvania, Banat, Máramaros (Maramureș) and Partium.

In 1881, Romanian-majority settlements projected to the present-day territory of Hungary were: Bedő, Csengerújfalu, Kétegyháza, Körösszakál, Magyarcsanád, Méhkerék, Mezőpeterd, Pusztaottlaka and Vekerd. Important communities lived in Battonya, Elek, Körösszegapáti, Létavértes, Nyíradony, Pocsaj, Sarkadkeresztúr, and Zsáka.

The numbers of Romanians in Hungary increased briefly with the onset of World War II when Hungary annexed parts of Czechoslovakia, Romania, and Yugoslavia. These annexations were affirmed under the Munich Agreement (1938), two Vienna Awards (1938 and 1940). In particular, the population of Northern Transylvania, according to the Hungarian census from 1941 counted 53.5% Hungarians and 39.1% Romanians. According to Romanian estimates of the region before the arbitration in 1940, there were 1,304,903 Romanians (50.2%) and 978,074 (37.1%) Hungarians.

In 1950, Foaia Românească ("The Romanian Sheet"; then known by another name) was founded in Gyula. It was the first newspaper of the Romanian minority in modern Hungary and currently is the one with longest and widest level of circulation within the country.

== Notable people ==
The following is a list of Romanian figures in post-Trianon (1920–) Hungary:

- Maria Berényi (born 1959), historian and poet
- Mária Gurzó (born 1968), politician
- György Simonka (born 1974), businessman and politician

Additionally, politician and finance minister János Bud (1880–1950), Speaker of the House of Magnates Jenő Rátz (1882–1952), film director and screenwriter Miklós Jancsó (1921–2014) and poet Attila József (1905–1937) were of Romanian origin.

== See also ==
- List of settlements in Hungary by ethnic Romanian population
- Hungary–Romania relations
- Diocese of Gyula
- Hungarians in Romania
