= Tiszagyulaháza =

Coordinates: 47°57′N 21°09′E

- Interactive map of Tiszagyulaháza
- Country: Hungary
- County: Hajdú-Bihar

Area
  - Total: 20.78 km^{2} (8.02 sq mi)

Population (2015)
  - Total: 724
  - Density: 34.8/km^{2} (90/sq mi)
- Time zone: UTC+1 (CET)
  - Summer (DST): UTC+2 (CEST)
- Postal code: 4097
- Area code: 52

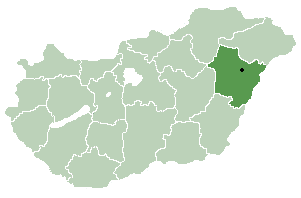
Location of Hajdú-Bihar county in Hungary

Tiszagyulaháza is a village in Hajdú-Bihar County, in the Northern Great Plain region of eastern Hungary.

== Geography ==
The village covers an area of 20.78 km^{2} (8 sq mi) and had a population of 724 people as of 2015.
