= Újléta =

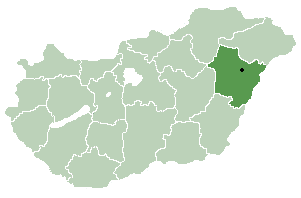
- Country: Hungary
- County: Hajdú-Bihar

Government
  - Mayor: Szimáné Tóth Erzsébet (Fidesz-KDNP)

Area
  - Total: 30.42 km^{2} (11.75 sq mi)

Population (2022)
  - Total: 1,025
  - Density: 33.69/km^{2} (87.27/sq mi)
- Time zone: UTC+1 (CET)
  - Summer (DST): UTC+2 (CEST)
- Postal code: 4288
- Area code: 52

Újléta is a village in Hajdú-Bihar county, in the Northern Great Plain region of eastern Hungary.

== Geography ==
It covers an area of 30.41 km^{2} (12 sq mi) and has a population of 1,025 people (2022).
