= Sáp =

Coordinates: 47°15′31″N 21°21′05″E

- Interactive map of Sáp
- Country: Hungary
- County: Hajdú-Bihar

Area
  - Total: 19.22 km^{2} (7.42 sq mi)

Population (2025)
  - Total: 796
- Time zone: UTC+1 (CET)
  - Summer (DST): UTC+2 (CEST)
- Postal code: 4176
- Area code: 54

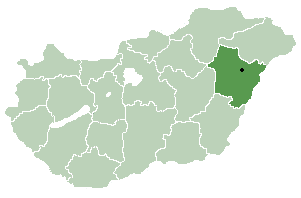
Location of Hajdú-Bihar county in Hungary

Sáp is a village in Hajdú-Bihar county, in the Northern Great Plain region of eastern Hungary.

== Geography ==
It covers an area of 19.22 km^{2} (7 sq mi) and has a population of 1046 people (2001).
