= Esztár =

Coordinates: 47°17′N 21°47′E

- Coat of arms
- Interactive map of Esztár
- Country: Hungary
- County: Hajdú-Bihar

Area
  - Total: 31.71 km^{2} (12.24 sq mi)

Population (2015)
  - Total: 1,335
  - Density: 42.1/km^{2} (109/sq mi)
- Time zone: UTC+1 (CET)
  - Summer (DST): UTC+2 (CEST)
- Postal code: 4124
- Area code: 54

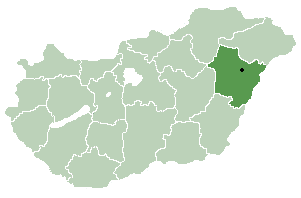
Location of Hajdú-Bihar county in Hungary

Esztár is a village in Hajdú-Bihar county, in the Northern Great Plain region of eastern Hungary.

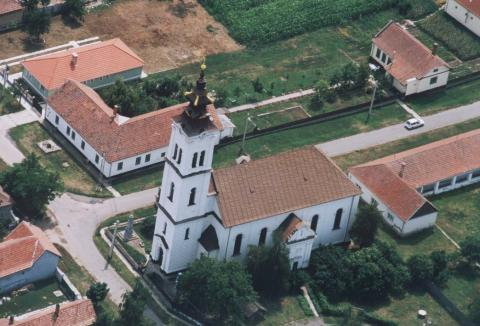
Aerial photography of Esztár

== Geography ==
It covers an area of 31.71 km^{2} (12 sq mi) and has a population of 1335 people (2015).
