= Nagyrábé =

Coordinates: 47°12′N 21°20′E

- Large village
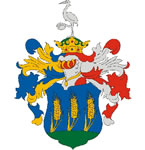
- Coat of arms
- Interactive map of Nagyrábé
- Country: Hungary
- County: Hajdú-Bihar
- District: Püspökladány

Area
  - Total: 85.42 km^{2} (32.98 sq mi)

Population (2015)
  - Total: 2,136
  - Density: 25/km^{2} (65/sq mi)
- Time zone: UTC+1 (CET)
  - Summer (DST): UTC+2 (CEST)
- Postal code: 4173
- Area code: (+36) 54

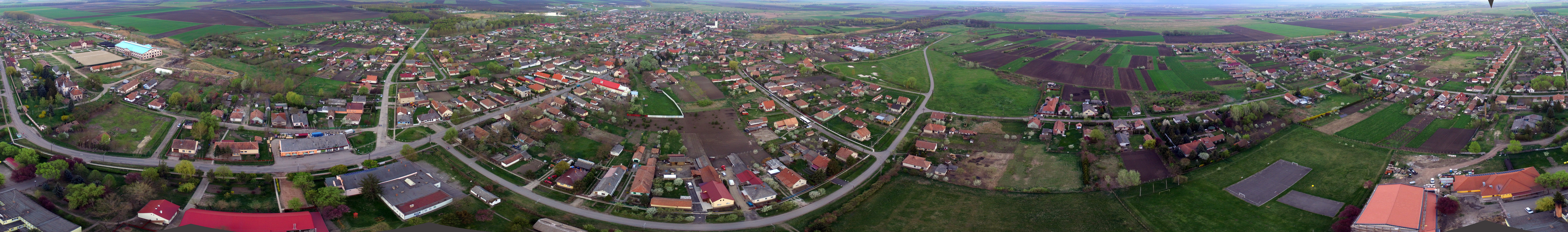
Nagyrábé - 2018 panoráma

Nagyrábé is a village in Hajdú-Bihar county, in the Northern Great Plain region of eastern Hungary.

== Geography ==
It covers an area of 85.42 km^{2} (33 sq mi) and has a population of 2136 people (2015).

== Location ==
North lat 47 12.36 East long 21 19.28
