= Komádi =

- Town
- Coat of arms

- Location within Hungary
- Coordinates: 47°00′N 21°30′E
- Country: Hungary
- County: Hajdú-Bihar
- District: Berettyóújfalu

Area
  - Total: 144.65 km^{2} (55.85 sq mi)

Population (2015)
  - Total: 5,421
  - Density: 37.5/km^{2} (97/sq mi)
- Time zone: UTC+1 (CET)
  - Summer (DST): UTC+2 (CEST)
- Postal code: 4138
- Area code: (+36) 54
- Website: www.komadi.hu

Komádi is a town in Hajdú-Bihar county, in the Northern Great Plain region of Eastern Hungary.

== Geography ==
It covers an area of 144.65 km^{2} (56 sq mi) and has a population of 5421 people (2015).
