= Csökmő =

- Large village
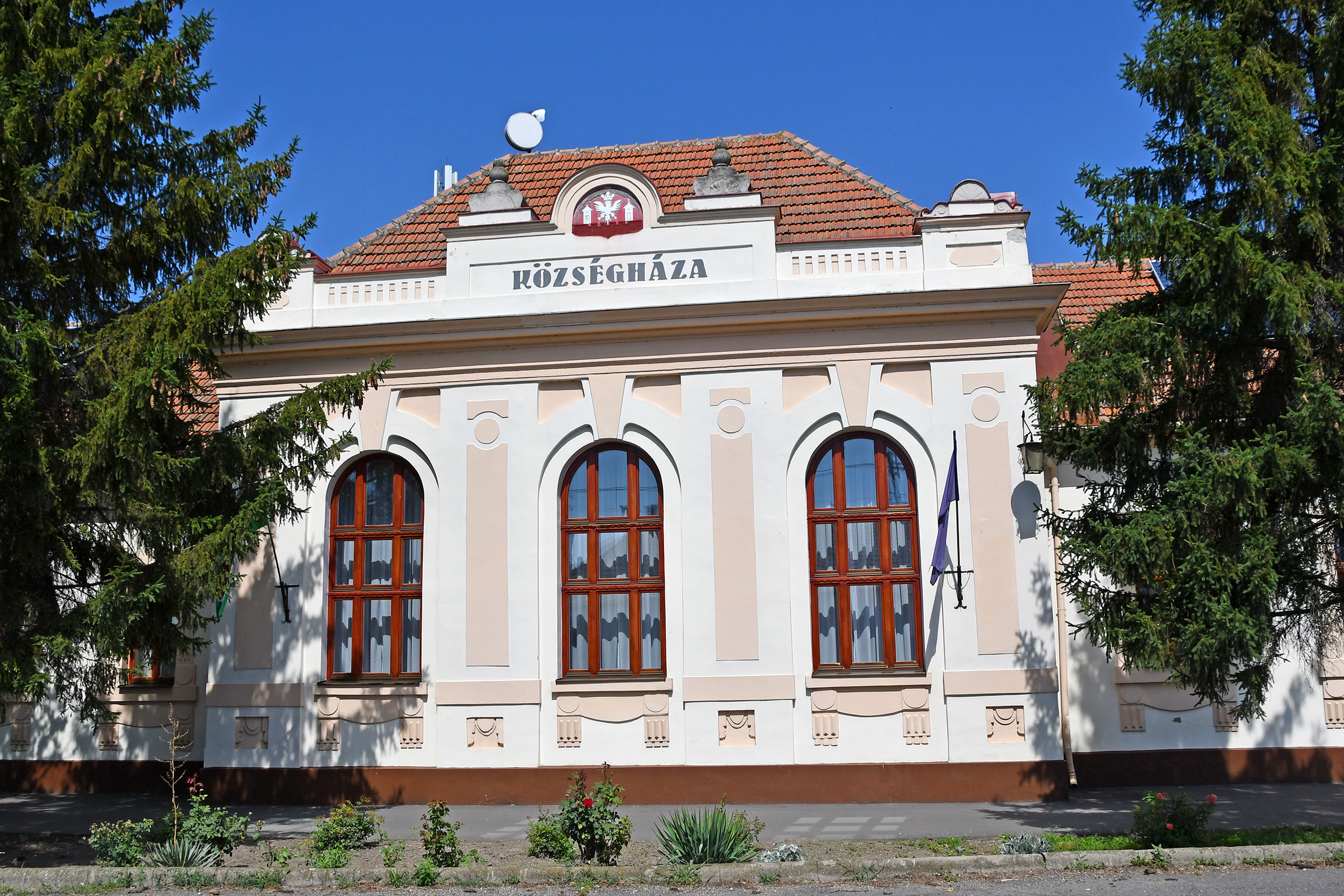
- Town hall

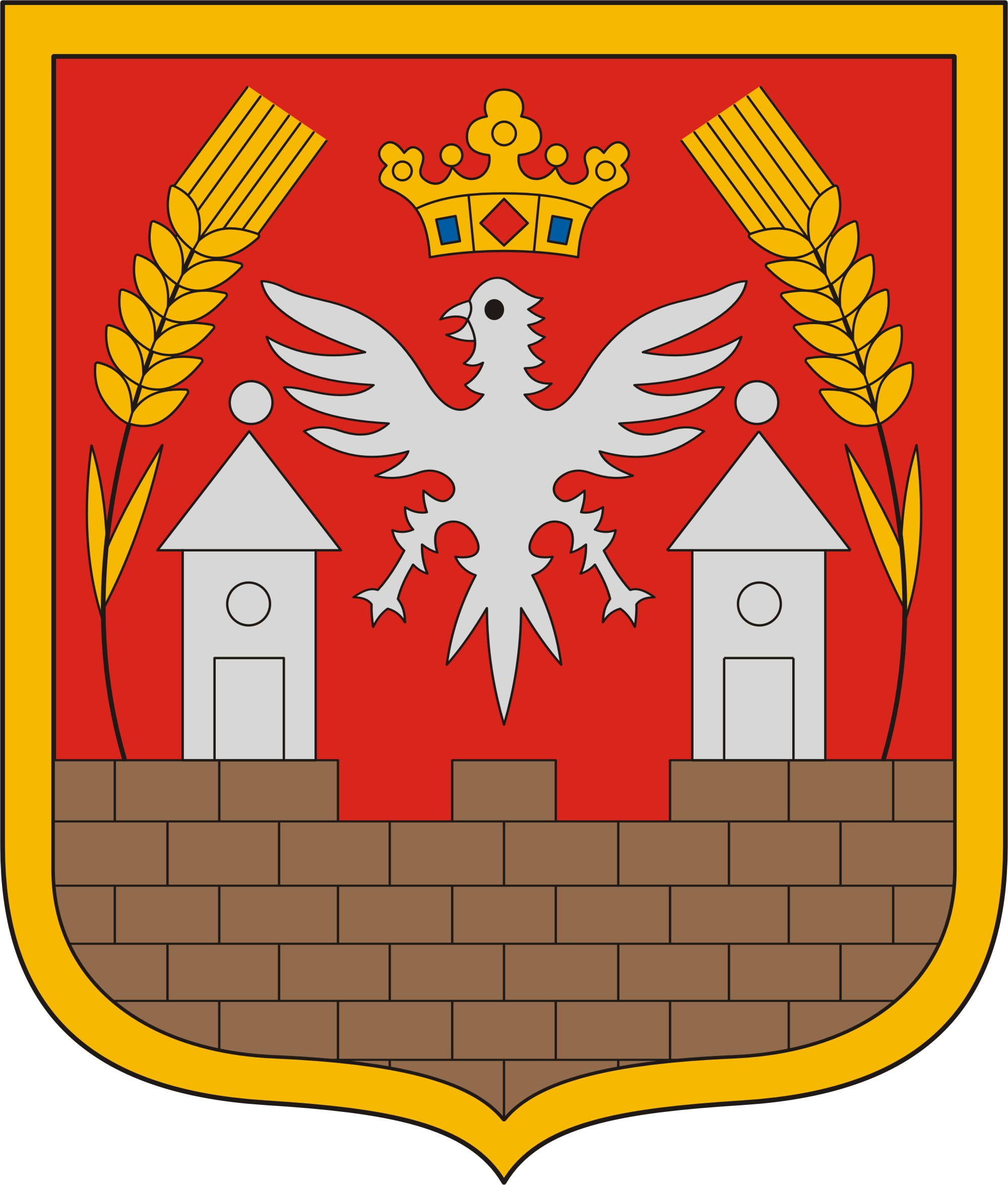
- Coat of arms

- Location within Hungary
- Coordinates: 47°02′N 21°18′E
- Country: Hungary
- County: Hajdú-Bihar
- District: Berettyóújfalu

Area
  - Total: 68.97 km^{2} (26.63 sq mi)

Population (2013)
  - Total: 1,925
  - Density: 27.9/km^{2} (72/sq mi)
- Time zone: UTC+1 (CET)
  - Summer (DST): UTC+2 (CEST)
- Postal code: 4145
- Area code: (+36) 54

Csökmő is a large village in Hajdú-Bihar county, in the Northern Great Plain region of eastern Hungary.

== Geography ==
It covers an area of 68.97 km^{2} (27 sq mi) and has a population of 1,925 people (2013 estimate).

== Population ==
Year	1980	1990	2001	2010	2011	2013
Population	2,462 (census)	2,238 (census)	2,171 (census)	1,835 (estimate)	1,928 (census)	1,925 (estimate)
