= Biharnagybajom =

Coordinates: 47°13′N 21°14′E

- Interactive map of Biharnagybajom
- Country: Hungary
- County: Hajdú-Bihar

Population (2001)
  - Total: 3,100
- Time zone: UTC+1 (CET)
  - Summer (DST): UTC+2 (CEST)
- Postal code: 4172
- Area code: 54

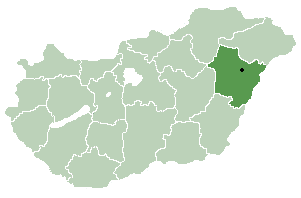
Location of Hajdú-Bihar county in Hungary

Biharnagybajom is a village in Hajdú-Bihar county, in the Northern Great Plain region of eastern Hungary. It has a population of 3100 people (2001) and was built on a flood plain.

Biharnagybajom was first mentioned in historical records in 1215 as two villages, Nagybajom and Kisbajom. The village includes a thermal well containing mineral water at 49 °C.
