= Mikepércs =

Coordinates: 47°27′N 21°38′E

- Coat of arms
- Interactive map of Mikepércs
- Country: Hungary
- County: Hajdú-Bihar

Government
  - Mayor: Timár Zoltán (Fidesz / KDNP)

Area
  - Total: 36.93 km^{2} (14.26 sq mi)

Population (2015)
  - Total: 3,520
  - Density: 121.3/km^{2} (314/sq mi)
- Time zone: UTC+1 (CET)
  - Summer (DST): UTC+2 (CEST)
- Postal code: 4271
- Area code: 52

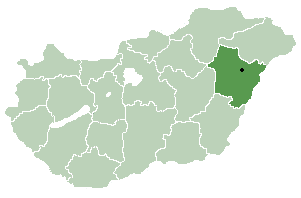
Location of Hajdú-Bihar county in Hungary

Mikepércs is a village in Hajdú-Bihar county, in the Northern Great Plain region of eastern Hungary.

== Geography ==
It covers an area of 36.93 km^{2} (14 sq mi) and has a population of 4,480 people (2015).

== Economy ==
=== CATL battery factory ===
As part of Hungarian president Viktor Orbán's 2010 "Eastern Opening" policy of economic realignment towards China and Russia, on 12 August 2022, Chinese battery manufacturer CATL announced it would construct a USD7.8 billion, 100 GWh battery factory on 221 hectares of land located in the Southern Economic Zone in Debrecen; the project was hailed by Hungary's governing Fidesz party as the biggest foreign investment in the nation's history, and the factory would be the largest of its kind in Europe.

However, residents began to protest as construction began, sparked in late 2022 by a street protest organised by a group of local women. At two public hearings regarding the project, townspeople started fights and shouted at government officials, calling them traitors — a reporter for local newspaper Debreciner described "hundreds of people yelling and fighting". Mikepércs' mayor Timár Zoltán announced he was also opposed to the project, despite being a member of Fidesz himself; similarly, György Matolcsy, the governor of the Hungarian National Bank, also came out against the factory.

Residents are concerned about pollution, property values, and unemployment. Zoltán told the New York Times that CATL had told him it was "too busy" to send a representative to a town-hall meeting. In response, Fidesz has blamed George Soros for fomenting protests; Debrecen mayor László Papp blamed "fake information" for the locals' opposition.
