= Tépe =

Coordinates: 47°19′N 21°35′E

- Coat of arms
- Interactive map of Tépe
- Country: Hungary
- County: Hajdú-Bihar

Area
  - Total: 23.22 km^{2} (8.97 sq mi)

Population (2015)
  - Total: 1,104
  - Density: 47.5/km^{2} (123/sq mi)
- Time zone: UTC+1 (CET)
  - Summer (DST): UTC+2 (CEST)
- Postal code: 4132
- Area code: 54

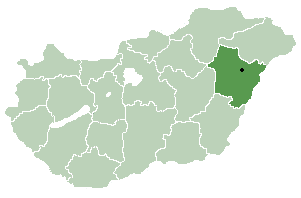
Location of Hajdú-Bihar county in Hungary

Tépe is a village in Hajdú-Bihar county, in the Northern Great Plain region of eastern Hungary.

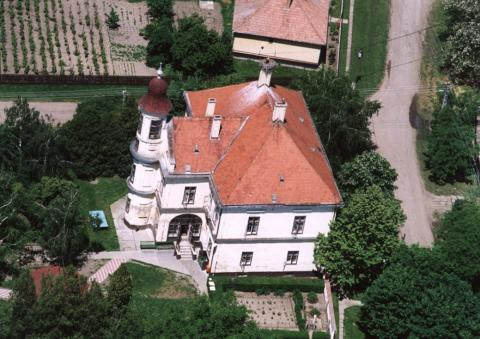
Aerial photography of Tépe

== Geography ==
It covers an area of 23.22 km^{2} (9 sq mi) and has a population of 1104 people (2015).
