= Bihartorda =

Coordinates: 47°13′N 21°22′E

- Coat of arms
- Interactive map of Bihartorda
- Country: Hungary
- County: Hajdú-Bihar

Population (2015)
  - Total: 941
  - Density: 42.1/km^{2} (109/sq mi)
- Time zone: UTC+1 (CET)
  - Summer (DST): UTC+2 (CEST)
- Postal code: 4174
- Area code: 54

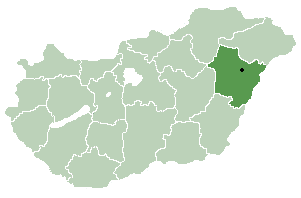
Location of Hajdú-Bihar county in Hungary

Bihartorda is a village in Hajdú-Bihar county, in the Northern Great Plain region of eastern Hungary.

== Geography ==
It has a population of 941 people (2015).
