= Hajdúbagos =

- Coat of arms

- Location within Hungary
- Coordinates: 47°23′33″N 21°39′55″E
- Country: Hungary
- County: Hajdú-Bihar

Area
  - Total: 37.44 km^{2} (14.46 sq mi)

Population (2025)
  - Total: 1,944
- Time zone: UTC+1 (CET)
  - Summer (DST): UTC+2 (CEST)
- Postal code: 4273
- Area code: 52

Hajdúbagos is a village in Hajdú-Bihar county, in the Northern Great Plain region of eastern Hungary.

== History ==
The village was known as "Csirebagos" for a time in the Middle Ages, referring back to the gentry Csir family who held a number of villages in the vicinity between the 12th and 16th centuries.

== Geography ==
It covers an area of 37.44 km^{2} (14 sq mi) and has a population of 1981 people (2001).
