= Hajdú–Bihar County =

County of Hungary

Coordinates: 47°25′N 21°30′E

Hajdú–Bihar County Hajdú-Bihar megye
- Counties of Hungary
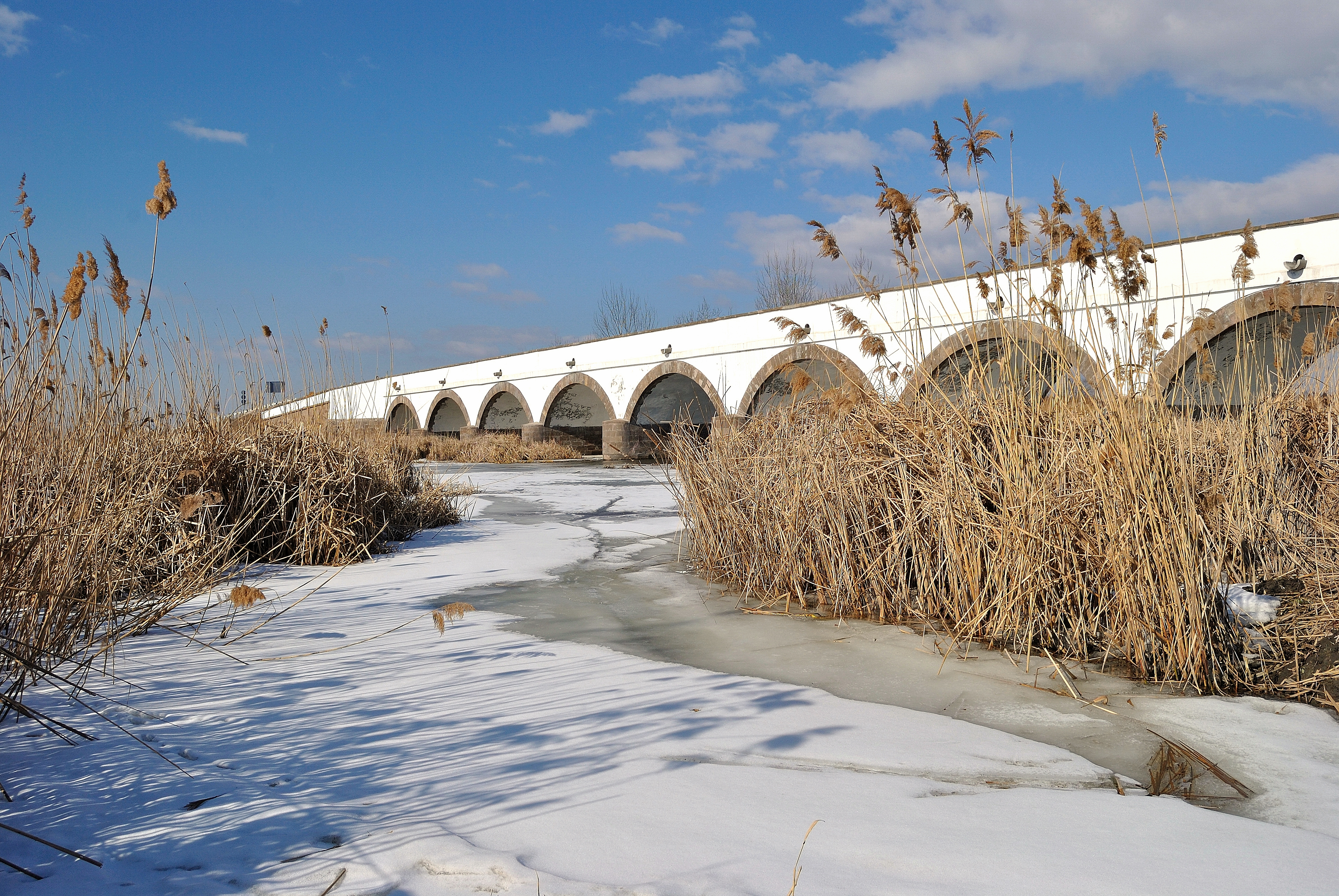
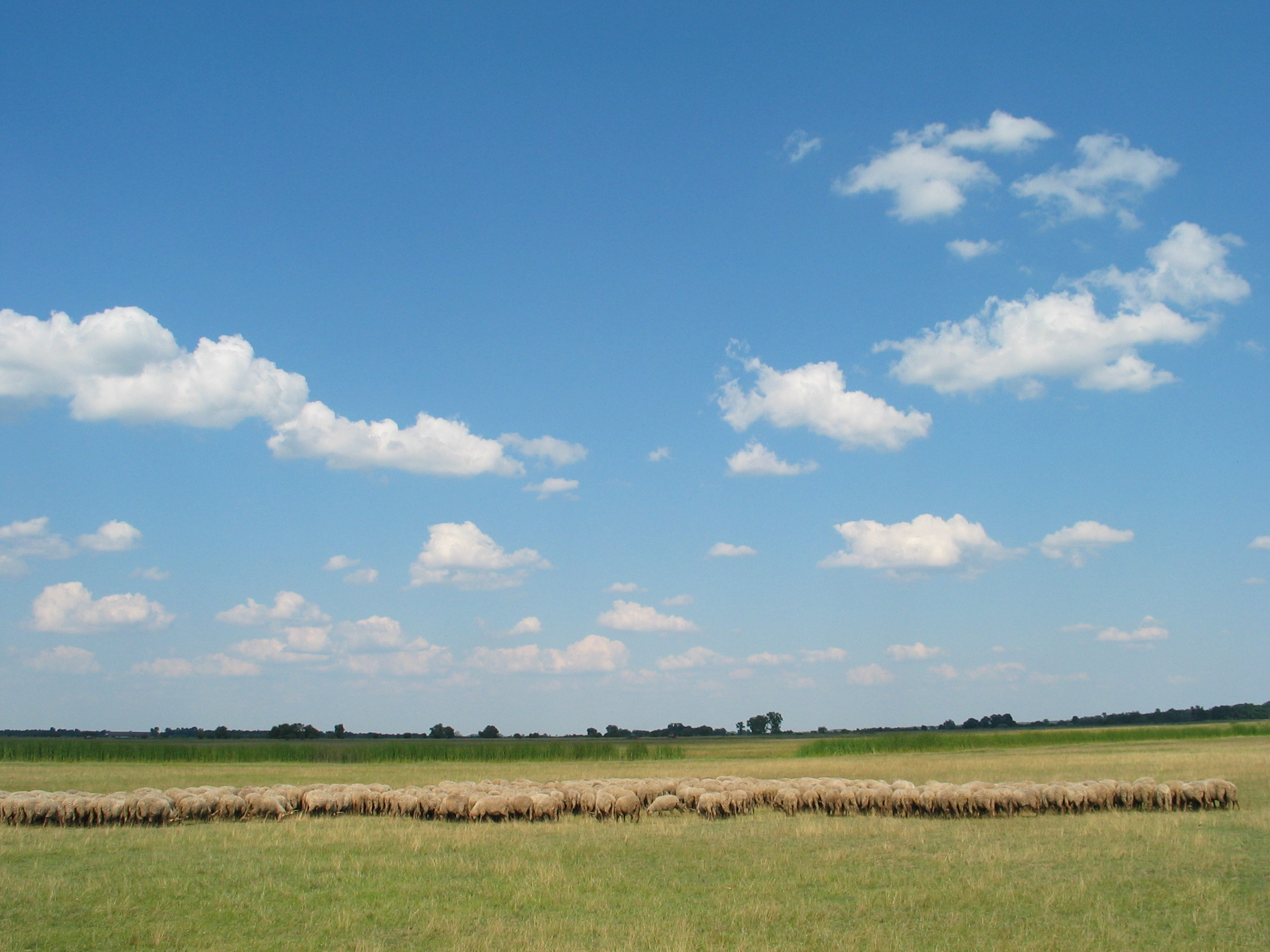
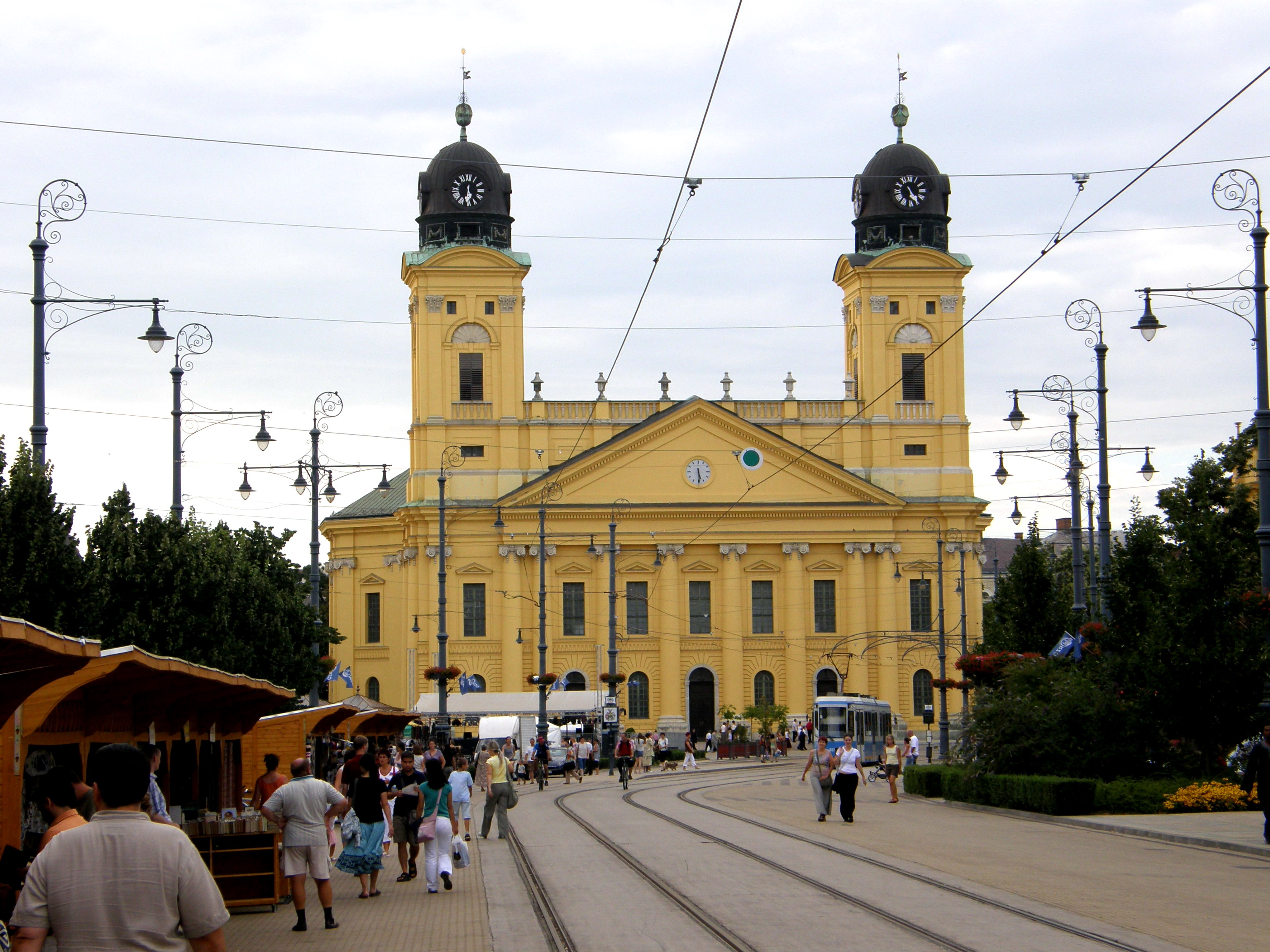
- Descending, from top: Nine-holed Bridge, Herd of Racka sheep in Hortobágy, and Downtown of Debrecen

- Flag Coat of arms

- Hajdú-Bihar County within Hungary
- Country: Hungary
- Region: Northern Great Plain
- County seat: Debrecen
- Districts: 10 districts: Balmazújváros District; Berettyóújfalu District; Debrecen District; Derecske District; Hajdúböszörmény District; Hajdúhadház District; Hajdúnánás District; Hajdúszoboszló District; Nyíradony District; Püspökladány District

Government
  - President of the General Assembly: Zoltán Pajna (Fidesz-KDNP)

Area
  - Total: 6,210.51 km^{2} (2,397.89 sq mi)
  - Rank: 4th in Hungary

Population (2018)
  - Total: 530,464
  - Rank: 4th in Hungary
  - Density: 85.4139/km^{2} (221.221/sq mi)

GDP
  - Total: HUF 1,348 billion €4.330 billion (2016)
- Postal code: 40xx – 422x, 4241 – 4243, 425x – 429x
- Area code(s): (+36) 52, 54
- ISO 3166 code: HU-HB
- Website: hbmo.hu

Hajdú–Bihar (Hungarian: Hajdú-Bihar megye, pronounced [ˈhɒjduː ˈbihɒr]) is an administrative county (comitatus or megye) in eastern Hungary, on the border with Romania. It shares borders with the Hungarian counties Szabolcs-Szatmár-Bereg, Borsod–Abaúj–Zemplén, Jász–Nagykun–Szolnok and Békés. The capital of Hajdú-Bihar county is Debrecen. Together with Bihor County in Romania it constitutes the Biharia Euroregion.

== Geography ==
The area of the county does not form a geographical unit; it shares several features with the neighbouring areas: from northeast the sand hills of the Nyírség spread over the county borders. The western part is the Hortobágy National Park ("Puszta"), a large flat area of the country. The county of Hajdú–Bihar occupies the eastern part of Hungary. Most of its territory is completely flat and is part of the Pannonian Plain region (called the Grand Plain in the country). The highest point hardly rises over 170.5 metres in the north. It seems that the county slopes to the south because the lowest point is situated in this part of Hajdú-Bihar and hits the 85 metres height.

The wind and rivers formed and shaped the land for thousands of years. First the area of the present-day Hungary was occupied by an inland sea. Then, after some underground movement, the huge peaks of the Carpathians rose from this sea. The wild and rapid rivers of the mountains slowly made that inland sea disappear. Later, the great Hungarian plain was formed by the alluvial deposits of the rivers, the wind began to work and from the great rocks became smaller and smaller sand-grains, the so-called loess. This covers thickly the Hajdú-Bihar plain as well and makes a fertile soil. There are two great rivers in this area, the Tisza and the Körös. The Hortobágy area was formed by the first one. It used to be the flood area of the Tisza river and after the river was controlled, the Hortobágy became dry, resulting in special fauna.

== History ==
Hajdú–Bihar county was created after World War II from the pre-1938 counties Hajdú and Bihar. See the articles of those counties for the history before World War II.

== Demographics ==
Religion in Hajdú-Bihar County (2022 census – of those who declared their religion (63.1%))
1. Calvinistic (37.8%)
2. Roman Catholic (11.3%)
3. Greek Catholic (8.90%)
4. Baptist (0.60%)
5. Other Christian denomination (2.90%)
6. Other religion (0.60%)
7. Not religious (37.9%)

In 2015, it had a population of 537,268 and the population density was 87/km^{2}.

Year	County population	Change
1949	498,271	n/a
1960	▲522,787	4.92%
1970	▲524,952	0.41%
1980	▲551,448	5.05%
1990	▼548,728	-0.49%
2001	▲552,998 (record)	0.78%
2011	▼546,721	-1.34%
2015	▼537,268	-1.75%
2018	▼530,464	-1.28%

=== Ethnicity ===
The main minority populations in the county are Roma (about 18,000), Romanian (about 2,000), and German (about 1,000).

Total population (2011 census): 546,721
Ethnic groups (2011 census):

- Hungarians: 461,809 (95.05%)
- Romani: 18,132 (3.73%)
- Others and indefinable: 5,936 (1.22%)

About 77,000 people in Hajdú-Bihar County did not declare their ethnicity during the 2011 census.

=== Religion ===
Religious adherence in the county according to 2011 census:

- Reformed – 158,513;
- Catholic – 86,084 (Roman Catholic – 53,697; Greek Catholic – 32,359);
- Evangelical – 1,086;
- Orthodox – 862;
- other religions – 10,330;
- Non-religious – 147,001;
- Atheism – 6,416;
- Undeclared – 136,429.

== Regional structure ==
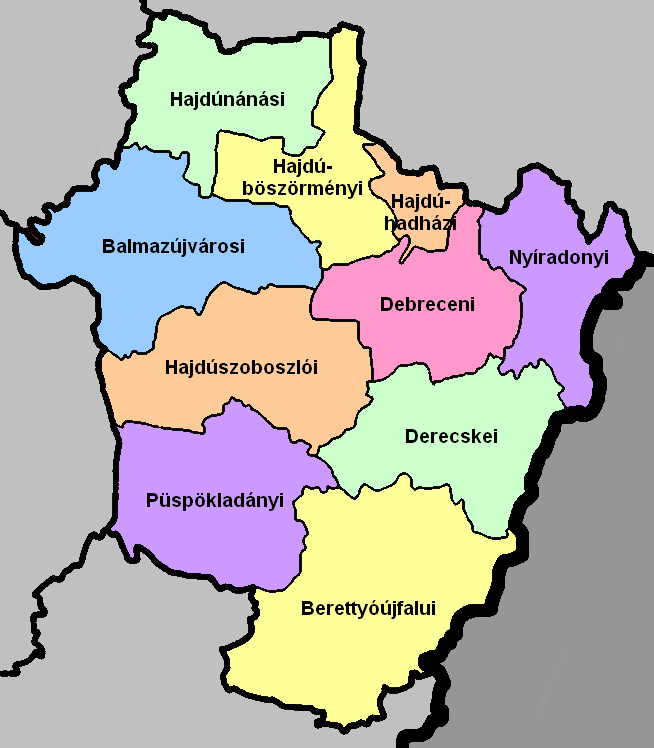
District of Hajdú–Bihar County

No.	English and Hungarian names	Area (km^{2})	Population (2011)	Density (pop./km^{2})	Seat	No. of municipalities
1	Balmazújváros District; Balmazújvárosi járás	827.45	30,191	36	Balmazújváros	5
2	Berettyóújfalu District; Berettyóújfalui járás	1,073.90	44,995	42	Berettyóújfalu	25
3	Debrecen District; Debreceni járás	531.12	224,228	423	Debrecen	2
4	Derecske District; Derecskei járás	650.30	41,701	64	Derecske	13
5	Hajdúböszörmény District; Hajdúböszörményi járás	471.43	40,568	86	Hajdúböszörmény	2
6	Hajdúhadház District; Hajdúhadházi járás	137.02	22,183	162	Hajdúhadház	3
7	Hajdúnánás District; Hajdúnánási járás	547.27	29,614	54	Hajdúnánás	6
8	Hajdúszoboszló District; Hajdúszoboszlói járás	732.65	43,061	59	Hajdúszoboszló	5
9	Nyíradony District; Nyíradonyi járás	510.28	29,534	58	Nyíradony	9
10	Püspökladány District; Püspökladányi járás	729.04	40,426	55	Püspökladány	12
Hajdú-Bihar County		6,210.51	546,721	88	Debrecen	82

== Economy ==
=== Infrastructure ===
Highways no. 4, 33, 35, 42 and 47 lead to the county and the county can also be reached Hajdú–Bihar via the M3 motorway (this motorway is now a spur to Debrecen). The total length of the public roads in the county is 1,511 km. 122 road bridges span the rivers and canals. The roads cross the national borders to Romania at the cities of Ártánd and Nyírábrány.

== Politics ==
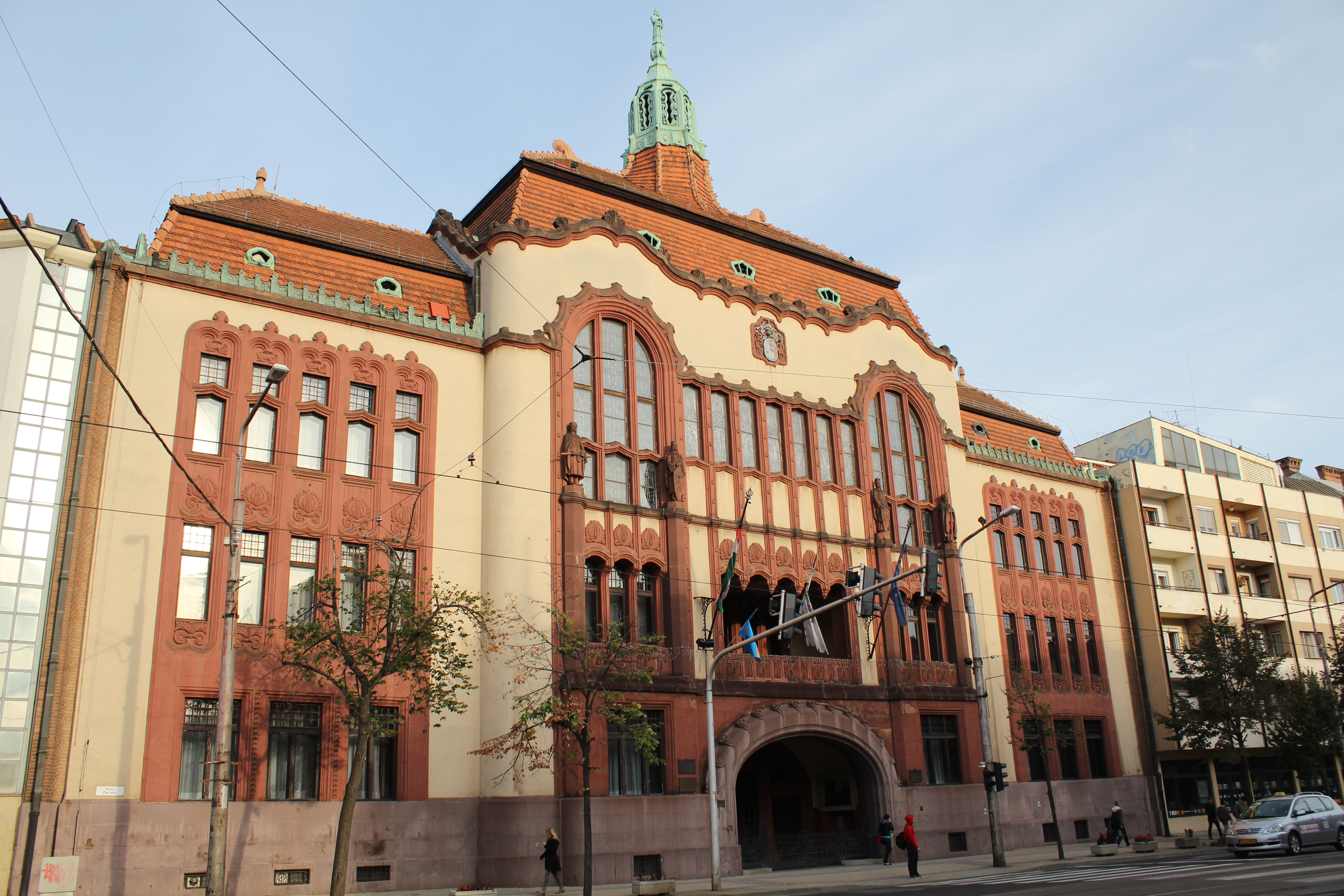
Countyhall of Hajdú–Bihar

=== County Assembly ===
The Hajdú–Bihar County Council, elected at the 2024 local government elections, is made up of 24 counselors, with the following party composition:

Party	Seats	Current County Assembly
Fidesz-KDNP	15	
Our Homeland Movement	4	
Momentum Movement	3	
Democratic Coalition	2	

==== Presidents of the General Assembly ====
President	Terminus
Zoltán Pajna (Fidesz-KDNP)	2014–

=== Members of the National Assembly ===
The following members elected of the National Assembly during the 2022 parliamentary election:

Constituency	Member	Party
Hajdú-Bihar County 1st constituency	Lajos Kósa	Fidesz–KDNP
Hajdú-Bihar County 2nd constituency	László Pósán	Fidesz–KDNP
Hajdú-Bihar County 3rd constituency	László Tasó	Fidesz–KDNP
Hajdú-Bihar County 4th constituency	István Vitányi	Fidesz–KDNP
Hajdú-Bihar County 5th constituency	Sándor Bodó	Fidesz–KDNP
Hajdú-Bihar County 6th constituency	István Tiba	Fidesz–KDNP

== Municipalities ==
Hajdú–Bihar County has 1 urban county, 20 towns, 10 large villages and 51 villages. Hajdú–Bihar has a comparatively small number of inhabited places: 21 towns and 61 villages. The four largest cities – both by area and by population – are Debrecen, Hajdúböszörmény, Hajdúnánás and Hajdúszoboszló.

City with county rights

(ordered by population, as of 2011 census)

- Debrecen (211,320) – county seat

Towns

- Hajdúböszörmény (31,725)
- Hajdúszoboszló (23,933)
- Balmazújváros (17,537)
- Hajdúnánás (17,063)
- Berettyóújfalu (15,472)
- Püspökladány (14,895)
- Hajdúsámson (13,121)
- Hajdúhadház (12,588)
- Derecske (8,922)
- Nádudvar (8,853)
- Hajdúdorog (8,843)
- Polgár (8,098)
- Nyíradony (7,585)
- Létavértes (6,966)
- Téglás (6,432)
- Kaba (5,960)
- Komádi (5,421)
- Vámospércs (5,362)
- Tiszacsege (4,713)
- Biharkeresztes (4,149)

Villages

- Álmosd
- Ártánd
- Bakonszeg
- Bagamér
- Báránd
- Bedő
- Berekböszörmény
- Bihardancsháza
- Biharnagybajom
- Bihartorda
- Bocskaikert
- Bojt
- Csökmő
- Darvas
- Ebes
- Egyek
- Esztár
- Folyás
- Földes
- Furta
- Fülöp
- Gáborján
- Görbeháza
- Hajdúbagos
- Hajdúszovát
- Hencida
- Hortobágy
- Hosszúpályi
- Kismarja
- Kokad
- Konyár
- Körösszakál
- Körösszegapáti
- Magyarhomorog
- Mezőpeterd
- Mezősas
- Mikepércs
- Monostorpályi
- Nagyhegyes
- Nagykereki
- Nagyrábé
- Nyíracsád
- Nyírábrány
- Nyírmártonfalva
- Pocsaj
- Sáp
- Sáránd
- Sárrétudvari
- Szentpéterszeg
- Szerep
- Tépe
- Tetétlen
- Tiszagyulaháza
- Told
- Újiráz
- Újléta
- Újszentmargita
- Újtikos
- Váncsod
- Vekerd
- Zsáka

municipalities are large villages.

== Gallery ==
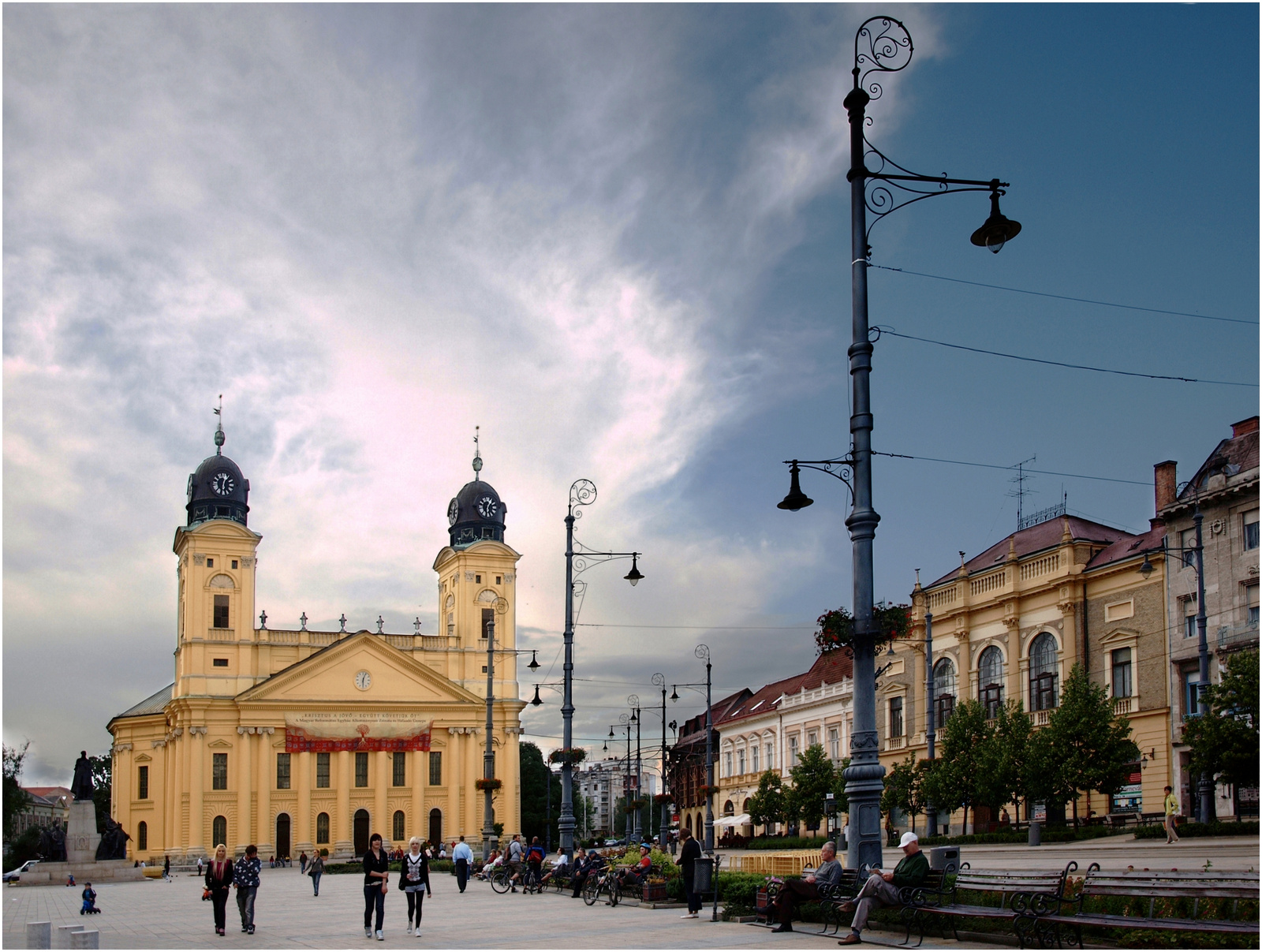
Debrecen, the Calvinist Rome

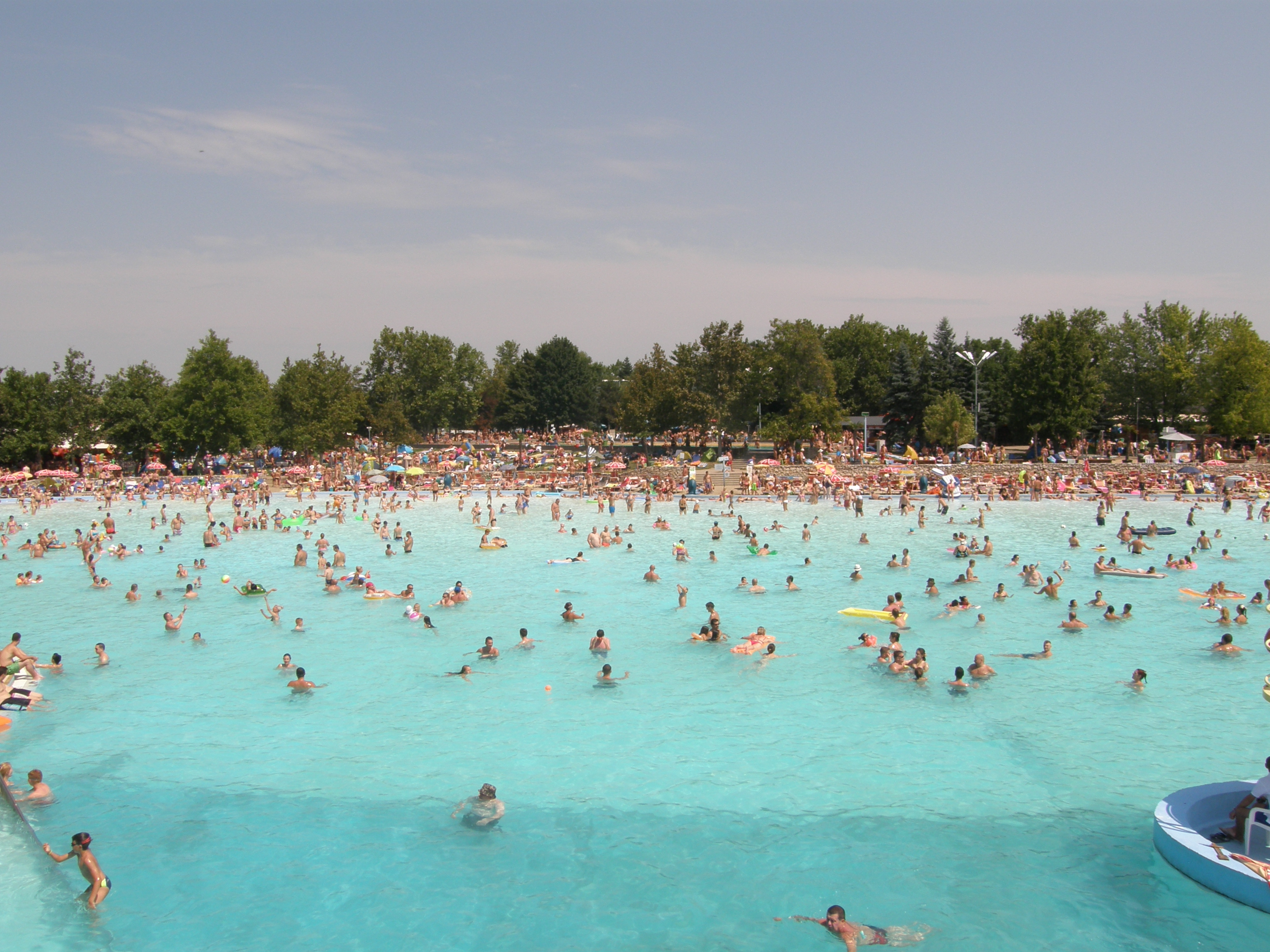
Pool in Hajdúszoboszló

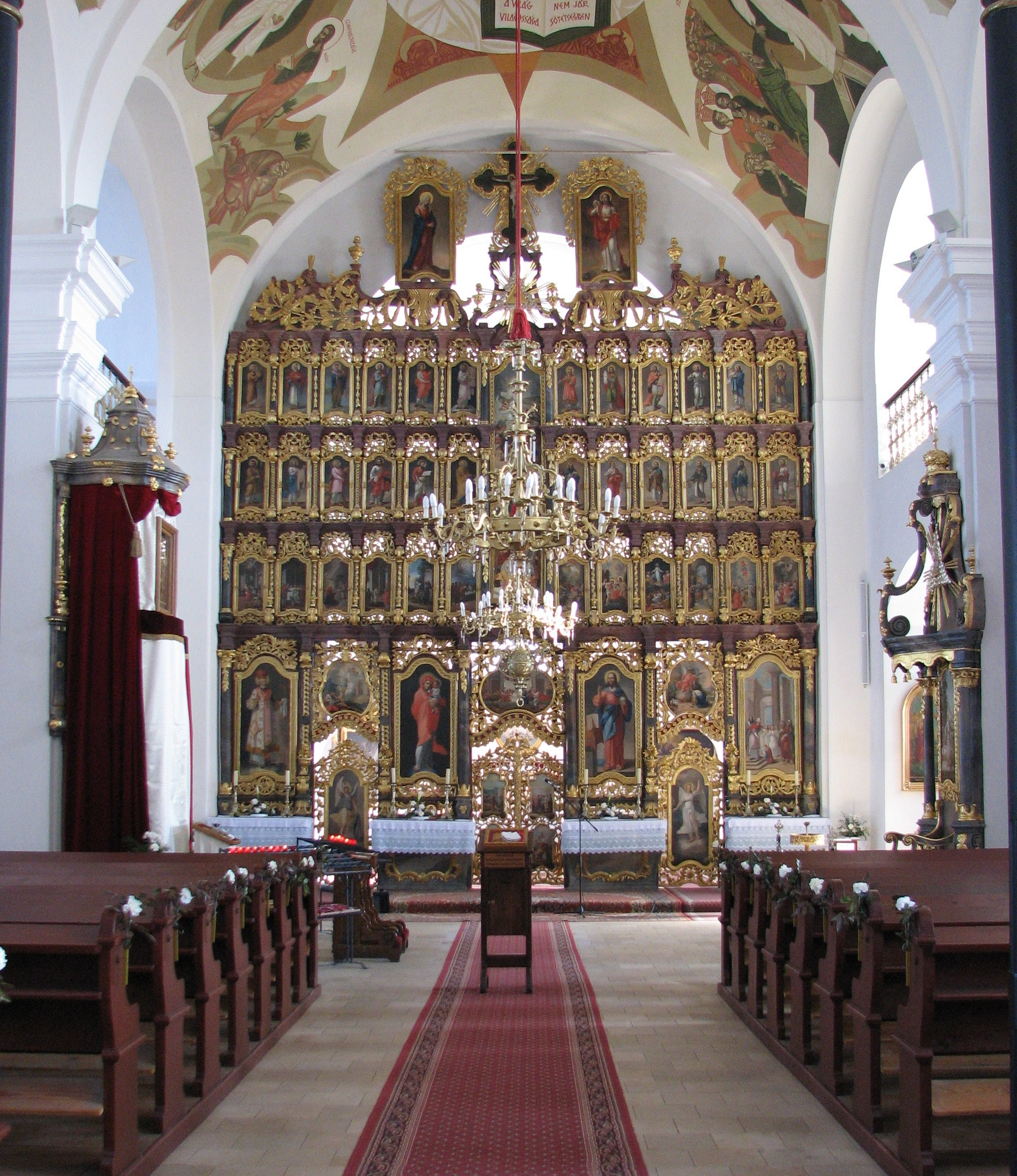
Greek Cathedral of Hajdúdorog

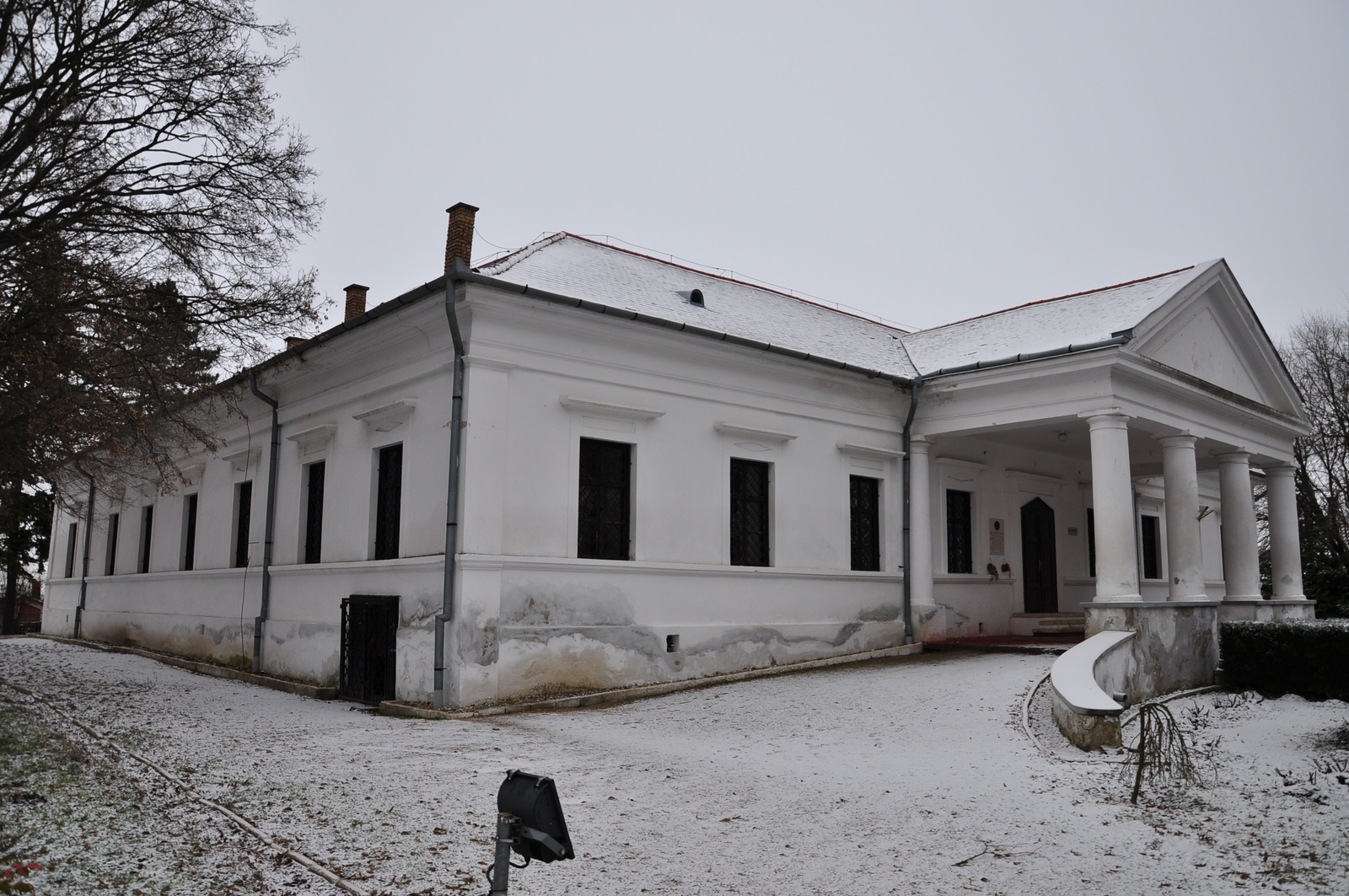
Bocskai Mansion in Nagykereki

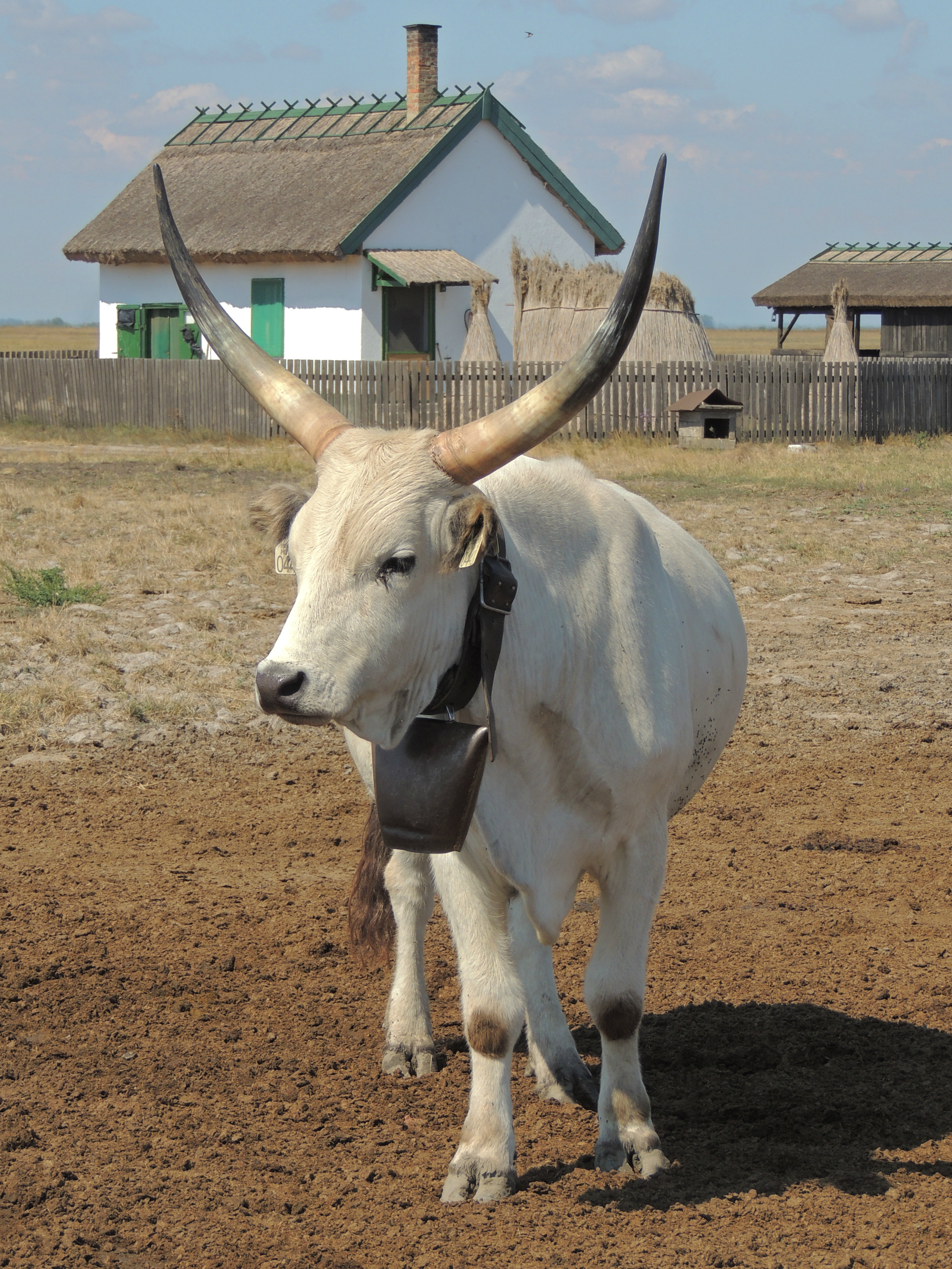
Hungarian grey cattle on the Hortobágy

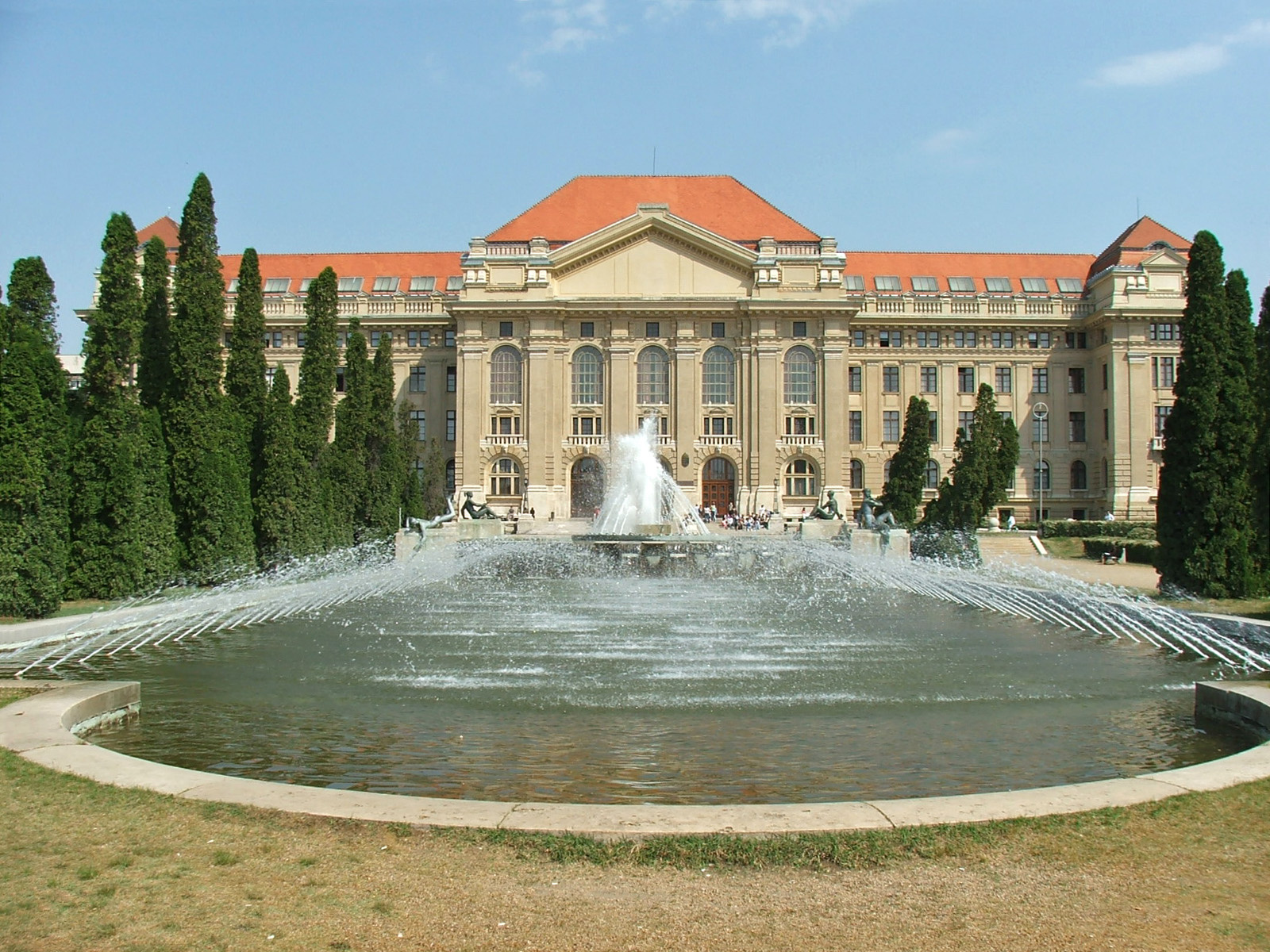
University of Debrecen

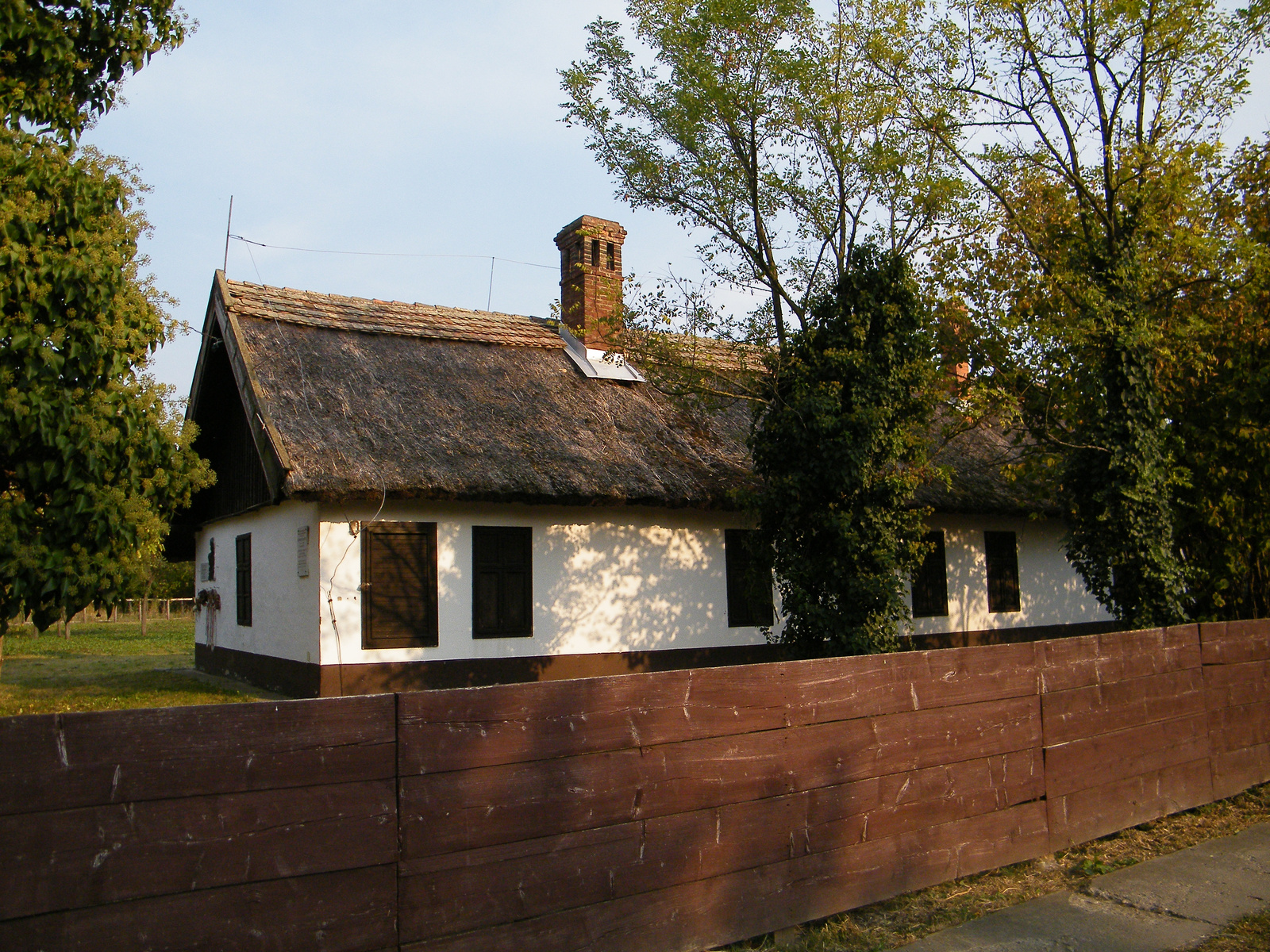
Traditional house in Biharnagybajom

== International relations ==
Hajdú-Bihar County has a partnership relationship with:

- Bihor County, Romania
- Cluj County, Romania
- East Kazakhstan Region, Kazakhstan
- Eure-et-Loir, Centre-Val de Loire, France
- Harghita County, Romania
- Canton of St. Gallen, Switzerland
- Toyama Prefecture, Chūbu, Japan
