= Berettyóújfalu =

- Town
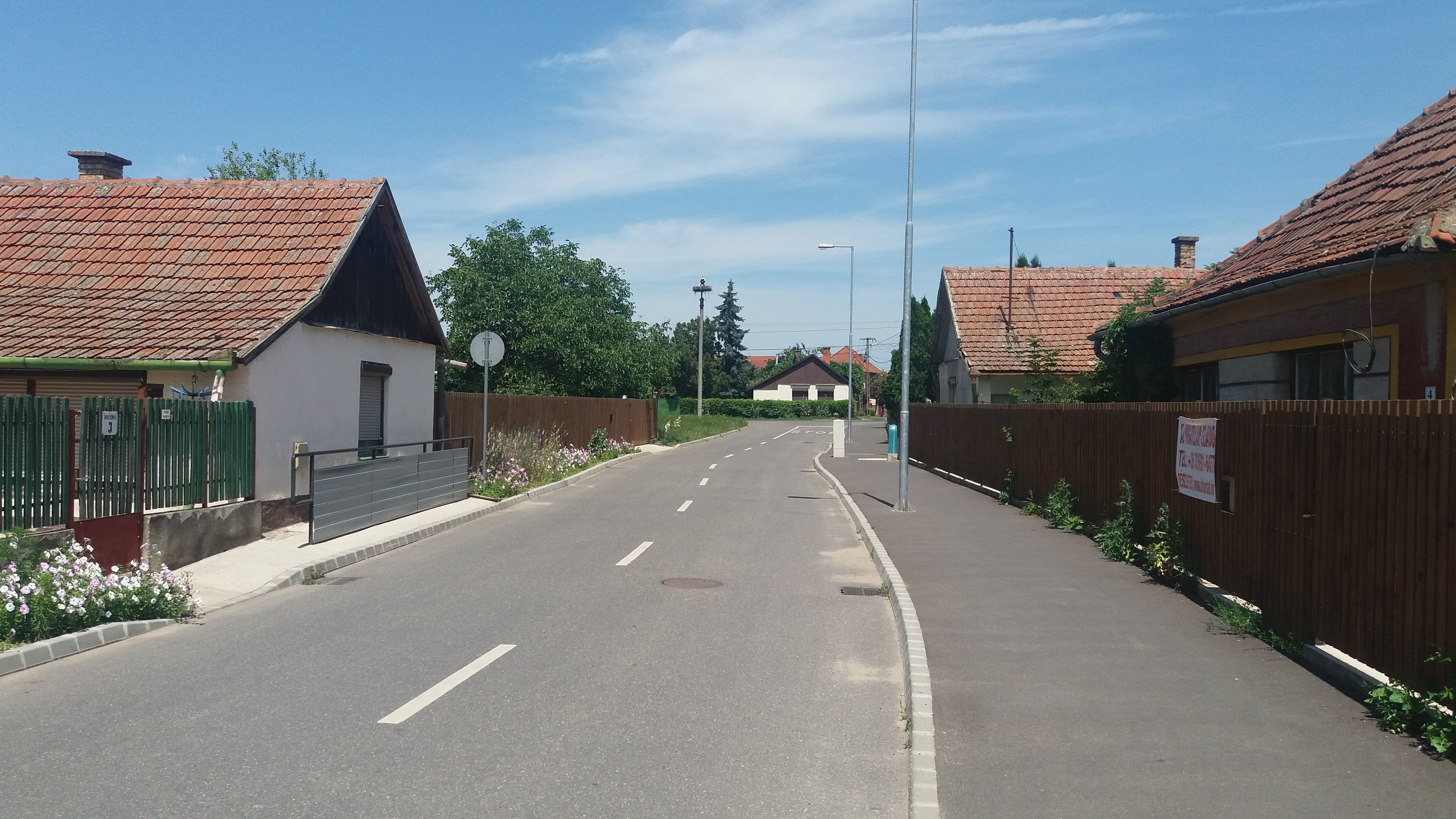

- Flag Coat of arms

- Location of Berettyóújfalu
- Coordinates: 47°13′N 21°33′E
- Country: Hungary
- County: Hajdú-Bihar
- District: Berettyóújfalu

Area
  - Total: 170.98 km^{2} (66.02 sq mi)

Population (2019)
  - Total: 14,614
  - Density: 85.472/km^{2} (221.37/sq mi)
- Time zone: UTC+1 (CET)
  - Summer (DST): UTC+2 (CEST)
- Postal code: 4100
- Area code: (+36) 54
- Website: www.berettyoujfalu.hu

Berettyóújfalu (Hungarian pronunciation: [ˈbɛrɛcːoːuːjfɒlu]; Romanian: Itfalău, Uifalău) is a town in Hajdú-Bihar county, in center of the Northern Great Plain region of eastern Hungary, near the border with Romania. It is strategically located, being 35 km south of Debrecen, the second largest city in Hungary, and 40 km west of Oradea, the tenth largest city in Romania. Berettyóújfalu is named after the river Berettyó.

== Geography ==
It covers an area of 170.98 km^{2} (66 sq mi) and has a population of about 15,000 people.

== History ==
This area has been inhabited since ancient times. A lot of artifacts from the late Bronze Age were found in the town area. In the Iron Age, Scythians, Sarmatians, Celts and Huns conquered this area one after another.

After the Hungarian conquest of the Carpathian Basin (C.E. 9–10th century) 14–15 villages came to be in this area where semi-nomad farming took place. The villages were built on the top of the hills, because this area was a huge swamp. People used boats to travel between the hills. Every settlement had at least one port.

The center of the villages was named Herpály. The first written mention of the village was the Regestrum Varadi in the 13th century. Herpály was important because of a Romanesque monastery (built in the 12th century). The village and the monastery were destroyed twice. No written records have survived about the monastery after the Mongol invasion of Europe (C.E. 1241–1242. in Hungary). At the first half of the 19th century the height of the walls was 8–12 meters (26–39 ft). Each of the two towers stood, until a local landowner demolished the north tower, because it was life-threatening. The bricks were offered to the base structure of the Reformed Church's organ. The ruin of the tower is called "csonkatorony" (lit. crooked tower) by the locals. The south tower and only its foundation is visible today.

Herpály had four streets in 1418, according to degree possession of sharing. The village had three pubs: one had a guestroom, the others had cellars. The estimated number of villagers was fewer than 300 people.

At the other bank of river Berettyó was a notable village, named Berettyószentmárton. It was a custom and tow place. In 1481 Matthias Corvinus (King of Hungary) donated right to hold markets for the settlement.

Herpály lamentable chronicle began in 1658, when Crimean Tatars burned the Berettyó-valley. The settlements was not completely destroyed, but Invasion Szejdi in 1660 certainly dispels the residents here.

Gábor Báthory (Prince of Transylvania, from 1608 to 1613) gave privilege for Berettyóújfalu on 23 May 1608, but it lost that privilege in the same century.

Significant changes happened in the landscape in the middle of the 19th century. The old "water world" disappeared when the river regulation had finished. The Püspökladány - Nagyvárad (later Oradea) railway line was built in 1858. It passes over Berettyóújfalu and gave dynamism to the development of the economy.

In the 1920s, with a new county hall, elementary school, hospital, official site built, Berettyóújfalu was the county seat of Bihar county between 1920 and 1940, and 1945–1950, because Oradea was annexed to Romania, after the Treaty of Trianon (4 June 1920). Later the government created Hajdú-Bihar County. From this time the county seat was Debrecen.

The catchment area is still large, the town is an important transport, economic and cultural center. There are five elementary and three high schools, a mill, a reconditioned spa, a regional hospital and major medical centers. Berettyóújfalu and Berettyószentmárton merged in 1970, and received city status in 1978.

=== 2026 incident ===
On August 4, 2026, a 15-year-old Danish girl was reported missing. She was found alive in Berettyóújfalu on August 6. On August 9, the girl was returned to her family. On August 11, a man from Berettyóújfalu was arrested.

The man was extradited to Denmark on August 19, while a potential co-conspirator had in the meantime died. According to the indictment, he had transported the girl from Denmark to Berettyóújfalu, thereby removing her from her parents' custody. He pleaded not guilty to all charges, stating that he was the girl's boyfriend.

== Twin towns – sister cities ==
Berettyóújfalu is twinned with:

- Marghita, Romania
- Montegrotto Terme, Italy
- Porcia, Italy
- Vyshny Volochyok, Russia
