= Zsáka =

- Large village
- Coat of arms

- Location within Hungary
- Coordinates: 47°08′N 21°26′E
- Country: Hungary
- County: Hajdú-Bihar
- District: Berettyóújfalu

Government
  - Mayor: Gitye János (Ind.)

Area
  - Total: 78.79 km^{2} (30.42 sq mi)

Population (2022)
  - Total: 1,412
  - Density: 17.92/km^{2} (46.42/sq mi)
- Time zone: UTC+1 (CET)
  - Summer (DST): UTC+2 (CEST)
- Postal code: 4142
- Area code: (+36) 54

Zsáka (Romanian: Jaca) is a large village in Hajdú-Bihar county, in the Northern Great Plain region of eastern Hungary.

== Geography ==
It covers an area of 78.79 km^{2} (30 sq mi) and has a population of 1,412 people (2022).
