= Gáborján =

Coordinates: 47°14′N 21°40′E

- Coat of arms
- Interactive map of Gáborján
- Country: Hungary
- County: Hajdú-Bihar

Area
  - Total: 26.46 km^{2} (10.22 sq mi)

Population (2015)
  - Total: 863
  - Density: 32.6/km^{2} (84/sq mi)
- Time zone: UTC+1 (CET)
  - Summer (DST): UTC+2 (CEST)
- Postal code: 4122
- Area code: 54

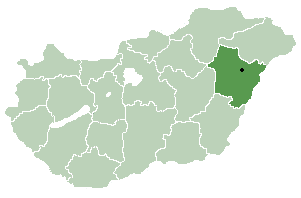
Location of Hajdú-Bihar county in Hungary

Gáborján is a village in Hajdú-Bihar county, in the Northern Great Plain region of eastern Hungary.

== Geography ==
It covers an area of 26.46 km^{2} (10 sq mi) and has a population of 863 people (2015).
