= Biharkeresztes =

- Town
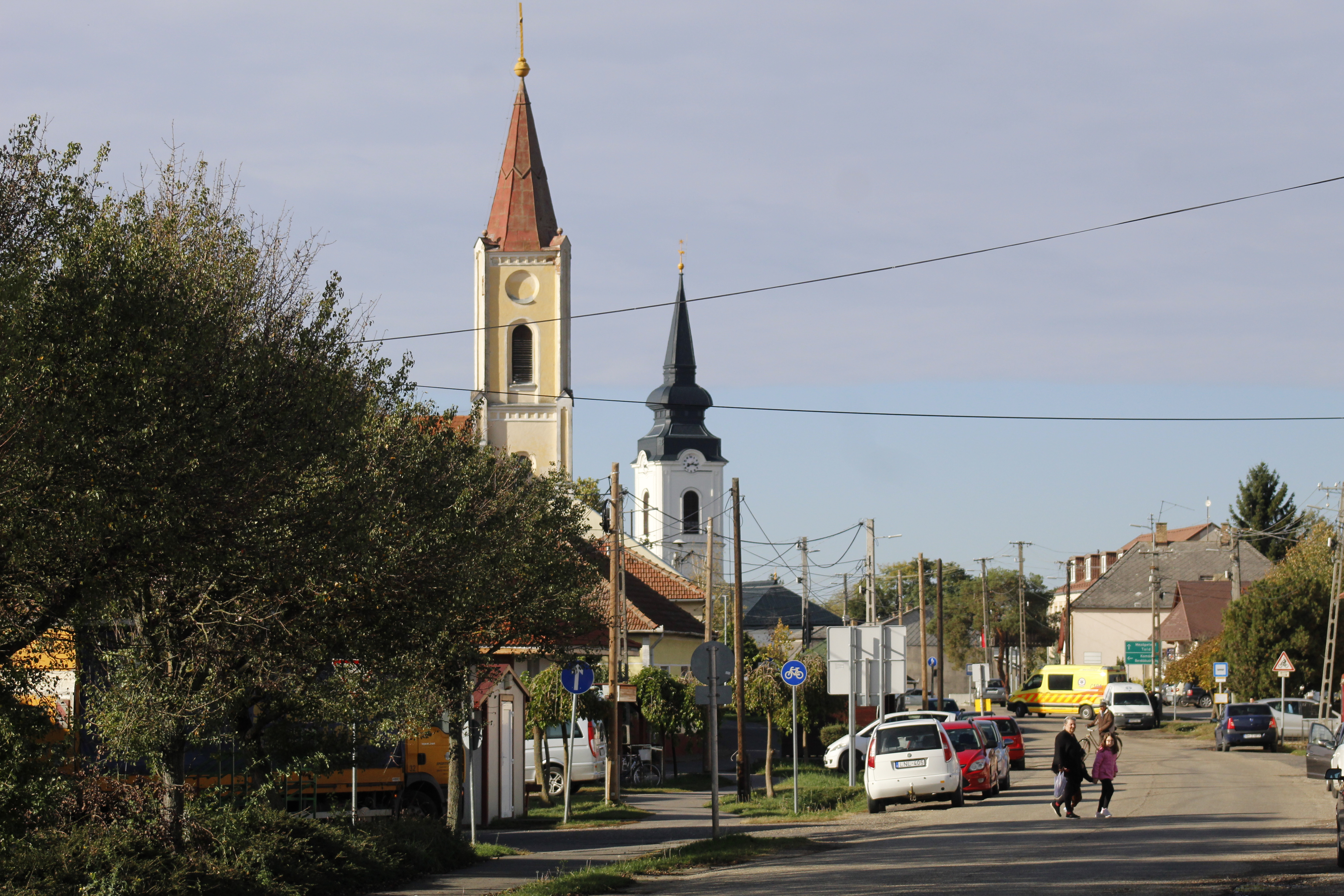

- Flag Coat of arms

- Location within Hungary
- Coordinates: 47°08′N 21°43′E
- Country: Hungary
- County: Hajdú-Bihar
- District: Berettyóújfalu

Area
  - Total: 49.26 km^{2} (19.02 sq mi)

Population (2015)
  - Total: 4,149
  - Density: 84.3/km^{2} (218/sq mi)
- Time zone: UTC+1 (CET)
  - Summer (DST): UTC+2 (CEST)
- Postal code: 4110
- Area code: (+36) 54
- Website: www.biharkeresztes.hu

Biharkeresztes is a town in Hajdú-Bihar county, in the Northern Great Plain region of eastern Hungary.

== Geography ==
It covers an area of 49.26 km^{2} (19 sq mi) and has a population of 4149 people (2015).
