= Újiráz =

Coordinates: 46°59′N 21°22′E

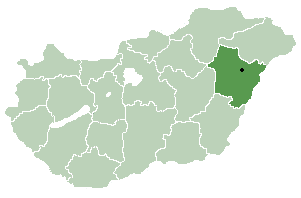
- Country: Hungary
- County: Hajdú-Bihar
- District: Berettyóújfalu

Area
  - Total: 15.47 km^{2} (5.97 sq mi)

Population (2003)
  - Total: 576
  - Density: 37.23/km^{2} (96.4/sq mi)
- Time zone: UTC+1 (CET)
  - Summer (DST): UTC+2 (CEST)
- Postal code: 4146
- Area code: 54

Újiráz is a village in Berettyóújfalu District of Hajdú-Bihar County, in the Northern Great Plain region of eastern Hungary.

== Geography ==
It covers an area of 15.47 km^{2} (6 sq mi) and has a population of 576 people (2003).
