= Szentpéterszeg =

Coordinates: 47°14′N 21°37′E

- Coat of arms
- Interactive map of Szentpéterszeg
- Country: Hungary
- County: Hajdú-Bihar

Area
  - Total: 25.51 km^{2} (9.85 sq mi)

Population (2025)
  - Total: 967
- Time zone: UTC+1 (CET)
  - Summer (DST): UTC+2 (CEST)
- Postal code: 4121
- Area code: 54

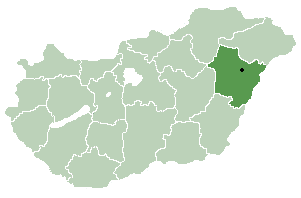
Location of Hajdú-Bihar county in Hungary

Széntpéterszeg is a village in Hajdú-Bihar county, in the Northern Great Plain region of eastern Hungary.

== Geography ==
It covers an area of 25.51 km^{2} (10 sq mi) and has a population of 1216 people (2001).

== Mayors ==
- 1990-2019 - Mihály Olajos
- 2019-Incumbent - Gábor Csaba Kiss
