= Kismarja =

Coordinates: 47°15′N 21°50′E

- Interactive map of Kismarja
- Country: Hungary
- County: Hajdú-Bihar

Area
  - Total: 47.16 km^{2} (18.21 sq mi)

Population (2015)
  - Total: 1,254
  - Density: 26.6/km^{2} (69/sq mi)
- Time zone: UTC+1 (CET)
  - Summer (DST): UTC+2 (CEST)
- Postal code: 4126
- Area code: 54

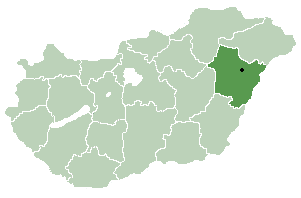
Location of Hajdú-Bihar county in Hungary

Kismarja is a village in Hajdú-Bihar county, in the Northern Great Plain region of eastern Hungary.

== Geography ==
It covers an area of 47.16 km^{2} (18 sq mi) and has a population of 1254 people (2015).
