= Bihardancsháza =

Coordinates: 47°14′N 21°19′E

- Coat of arms
- Interactive map of Bihardancsháza
- Country: Hungary
- County: Hajdú-Bihar

Population (2015)
  - Total: 172
  - Density: 20.7/km^{2} (54/sq mi)
- Time zone: UTC+1 (CET)
  - Summer (DST): UTC+2 (CEST)
- Postal code: 4175
- Area code: 54

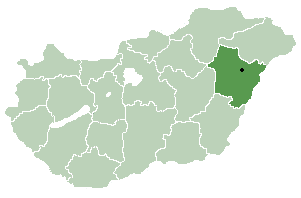
Location of Hajdú-Bihar county in Hungary

Bihardancsháza is a village in Hajdú-Bihar county, in the Northern Great Plain region of eastern Hungary.

== Geography ==
It has a population of 172 people (2015).
