= Bakonszeg =

Coordinates: 47°11′N 21°27′E

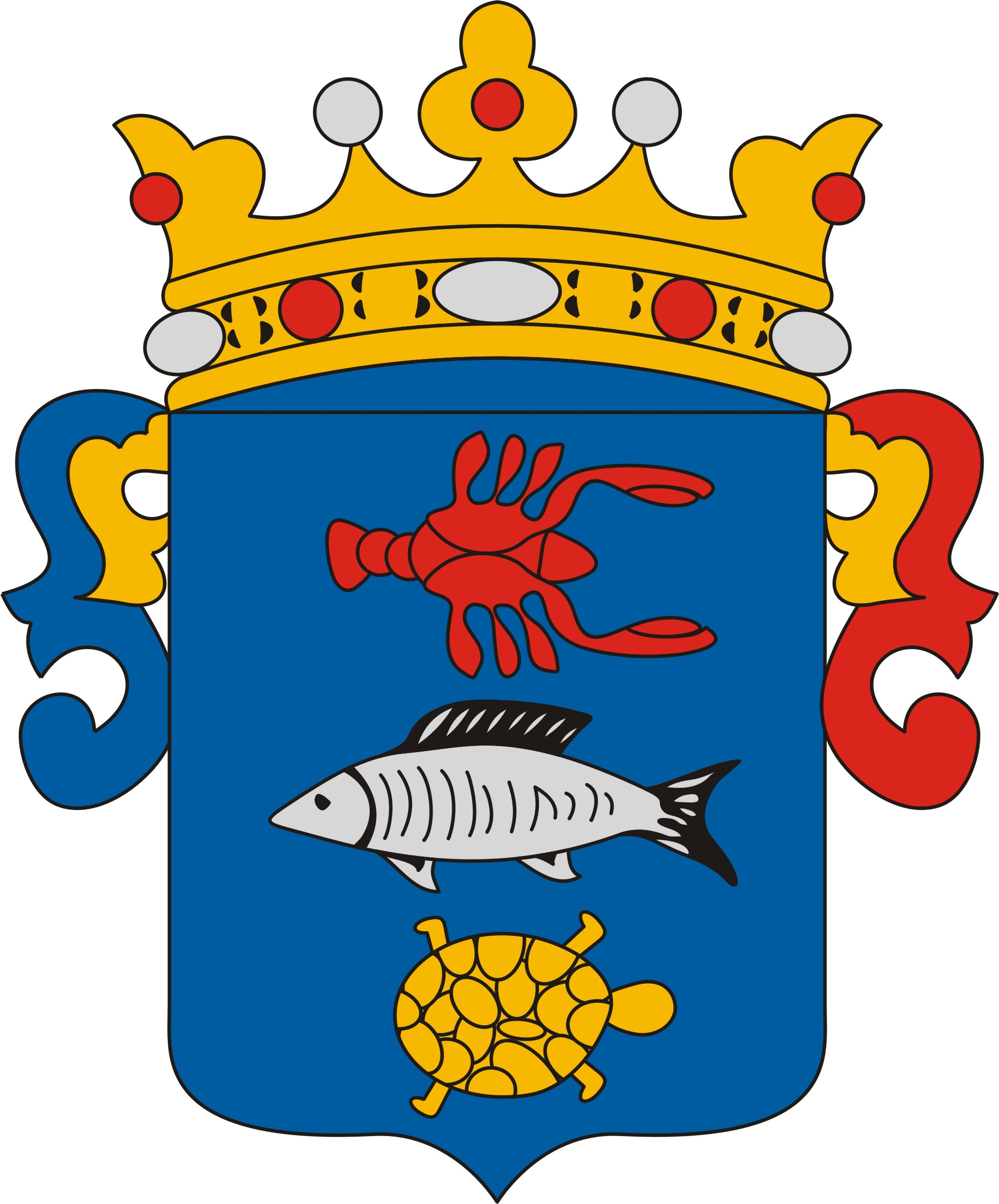
- Coat of arms
- Interactive map of Bakonszeg
- Country: Hungary
- County: Hajdú-Bihar

Area
  - Total: 35.02 km^{2} (13.52 sq mi)

Population (2015)
  - Total: 1,194
  - Density: 34.2/km^{2} (89/sq mi)
- Time zone: UTC+1 (CET)
  - Summer (DST): UTC+2 (CEST)
- Postal code: 4164
- Area code: 54

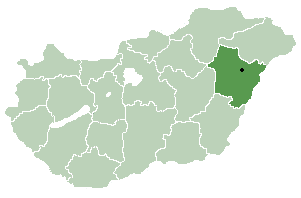
Location of Hajdú-Bihar county in Hungary

Bakonszeg is a village in Hajdú-Bihar county, in the Northern Great Plain region of eastern Hungary.

== Geography ==
It covers an area of 35.02 km^{2} (14 sq mi) and has a population of 1194 people (2015).
