= Magyarhomorog =

Coordinates: 47°01′N 21°33′E

- Interactive map of Magyarhomorog
- Country: Hungary
- County: Hajdú-Bihar

Area
  - Total: 39.56 km^{2} (15.27 sq mi)

Population (2015)
  - Total: 922
  - Density: 23.51/km^{2} (60.9/sq mi)
- Time zone: UTC+1 (CET)
  - Summer (DST): UTC+2 (CEST)
- Postal code: 4137
- Area code: 54

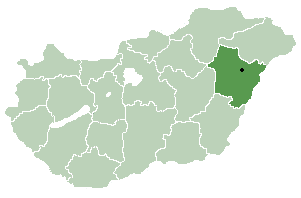
Location of Hajdú-Bihar county in Hungary

Magyarhomorog is a village in Hajdú-Bihar county, in the Northern Great Plain region of eastern Hungary.

== Geography ==
It covers an area of 39.56 km^{2} (15 sq mi) and has a population of 922 people (2015).
