= Váncsod =

Coordinates: 47°12′N 21°39′E

- Coat of arms
- Interactive map of Váncsod
- Country: Hungary
- County: Hajdú-Bihar

Area
  - Total: 34.43 km^{2} (13.29 sq mi)

Population (2015)
  - Total: 1,223
  - Density: 35.6/km^{2} (92/sq mi)
- Time zone: UTC+1 (CET)
  - Summer (DST): UTC+2 (CEST)
- Postal code: 4119
- Area code: 54

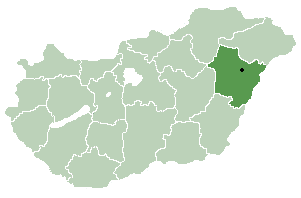
Location of Hajdú-Bihar county in Hungary

Váncsod is a village in Hajdú-Bihar county, in the Northern Great Plain region of eastern Hungary.

== Geography ==
It covers an area of 34.43 km^{2} (13 sq mi) and has a population of 1223 people (2015).
