= Darvas =

Coordinates: 47°06′11″N 21°20′18″E

- Interactive map of Darvas
- Country: Hungary
- County: Hajdú-Bihar

Area
  - Total: 42.31 km^{2} (16.34 sq mi)

Population (2025)
  - Total: 447
- Time zone: UTC+1 (CET)
  - Summer (DST): UTC+2 (CEST)
- Postal code: 4144
- Area code: 54

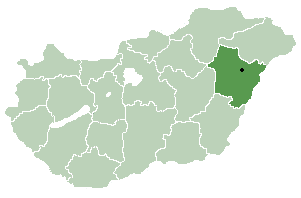
Location of Hajdú-Bihar county in Hungary

Darvas (Romanian: Darvaș) is a village in Hajdú-Bihar county, in the Northern Great Plain region of eastern Hungary.

== Geography ==
It covers an area of 42.31 km^{2} (16 sq mi) and has a population of 677 people (2001).
