= Bojt =

Coordinates: 47°12′N 21°44′E

- Coat of arms
- Interactive map of Bojt
- Country: Hungary
- County: Hajdú-Bihar

Area
  - Total: 26.88 km^{2} (10.38 sq mi)

Population (2001)
  - Total: 608
  - Density: 22.61/km^{2} (58.6/sq mi)
- Time zone: UTC+1 (CET)
  - Summer (DST): UTC+2 (CEST)
- Postal code: 4114
- Area code: 54

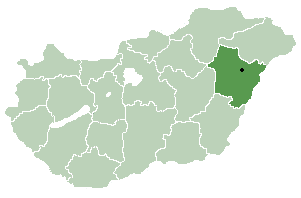
Location of Hajdú-Bihar county in Hungary

Bojt is a village in Hajdú-Bihar county, in the Northern Great Plain region of eastern Hungary.

== Geography ==
It covers an area of 26.88 km^{2} (10 sq mi) and has a population of 608 people (2001).
