= Hencida =

Coordinates: 47°15′N 21°42′E

- Interactive map of Hencida
- Country: Hungary
- County: Hajdú-Bihar

Area
  - Total: 34.79 km^{2} (13.43 sq mi)

Population (2015)
  - Total: 1,191
  - Density: 34.3/km^{2} (89/sq mi)
- Time zone: UTC+1 (CET)
  - Summer (DST): UTC+2 (CEST)
- Postal code: 4123
- Area code: 54

Hencida is a village in Hajdú-Bihar County in Hungary with a population of 1,191 people (2015).

== People ==
János Csire was born here in 1951. After graduating from BME (Budapest Technical University), he worked in the construction industry as a mid-level leader engineer. In 1990, he was elected vice mayor in the 3rd District of Budapest and served until 1995. He was re-elected in 2002 and served until 2006.

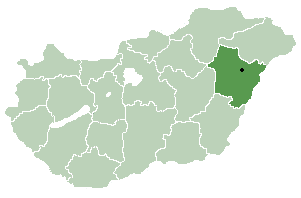
Location of Hajdú-Bihar county in Hungary

== Geography ==
It covers an area of 34.79 km^{2} (13 sq mi). The village is in the Northern Great Plain region of eastern Hungary.
