= Furta =

Coordinates: 47°08′N 21°28′E

- Interactive map of Furta
- Country: Hungary
- County: Hajdú-Bihar

Area
  - Total: 42.85 km^{2} (16.54 sq mi)

Population (2001)
  - Total: 1,179
  - Density: 27.51/km^{2} (71.3/sq mi)
- Time zone: UTC+1 (CET)
  - Summer (DST): UTC+2 (CEST)
- Postal code: 4141
- Area code: 54

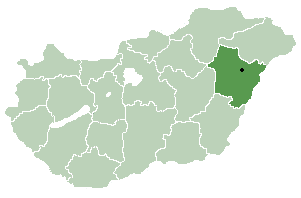
Location of Hajdú-Bihar county in Hungary

Furta is a village in Hajdú-Bihar county, in the Northern Great Plain region of eastern Hungary.

== Geography ==
It covers an area of 42.85 km^{2} (17 sq mi) and has a population of 1179 people (2001).
