= Mezősas =

Coordinates: 47°07′N 21°34′E

- Interactive map of Mezősas
- Country: Hungary
- County: Hajdú-Bihar

Area
  - Total: 26.39 km^{2} (10.19 sq mi)

Population (2015)
  - Total: 665
  - Density: 25.2/km^{2} (65/sq mi)
- Time zone: UTC+1 (CET)
  - Summer (DST): UTC+2 (CEST)
- Postal code: 4134
- Area code: 54

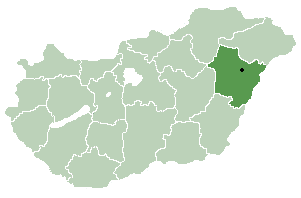
Location of Hajdú-Bihar county in Hungary

Mezősas is a village in Hajdú-Bihar county, in the Northern Great Plain region of eastern Hungary.

== Geography ==
Mezősas is located 50 kilometers away from the city of Debrecen, and is located within Hajdú-Bihar county. Like most major villages in Hungary, Mezősas is accessible by road. The village has a population estimate of 595 as of the first of January, 2011. The last actual head count was in 2015, when the population totaled 665, down from the 779 people residing there in 1990.
