= Berekböszörmény =

Coordinates: 47°04′N 21°41′E

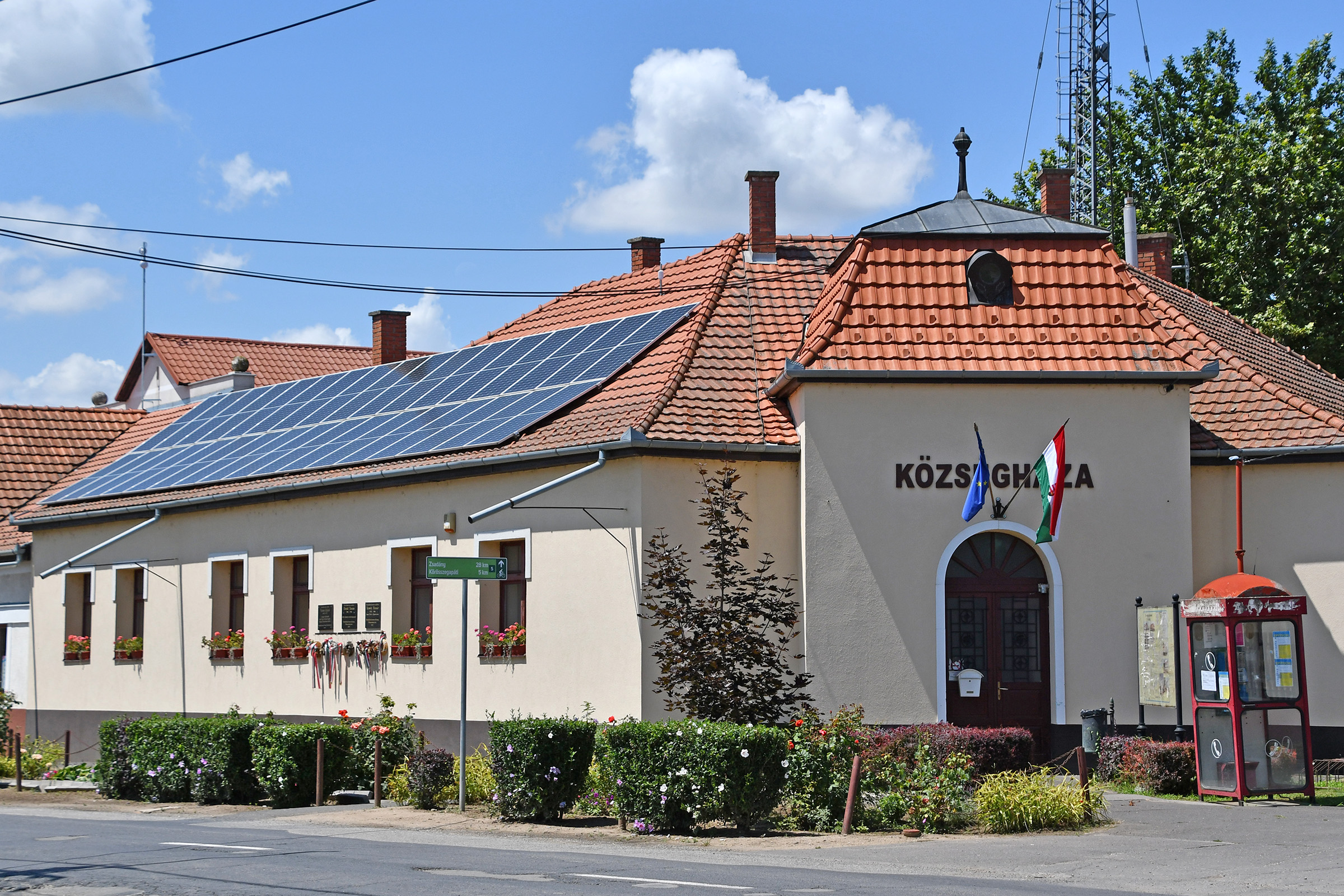
- Village hall

- Coat of arms
- Interactive map of Berekböszörmény
- Country: Hungary
- County: Hajdú-Bihar

Area
  - Total: 42.84 km^{2} (16.54 sq mi)

Population (2015)
  - Total: 1,923
  - Density: 44.9/km^{2} (116/sq mi)
- Time zone: UTC+1 (CET)
  - Summer (DST): UTC+2 (CEST)
- Postal code: 4116
- Area code: 54

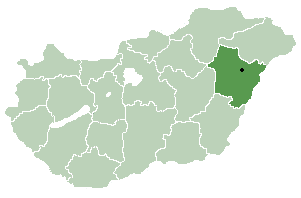
Location of Hajdú-Bihar county in Hungary

Berekböszörmény is a village in Hajdú-Bihar county, in the Northern Great Plain region of eastern Hungary.

== Geography ==
It covers an area of 42.84 km^{2} (17 sq mi) and has a population of 1923 people (2015).
