= Told (village) =

Coordinates: 47°07′N 21°39′E

- Coat of arms
- Interactive map of Told
- Country: Hungary
- County: Hajdú-Bihar

Area
  - Total: 14.91 km^{2} (5.76 sq mi)

Population (2015)
  - Total: 306
  - Density: 20.5/km^{2} (53/sq mi)
- Time zone: UTC+1 (CET)
  - Summer (DST): UTC+2 (CEST)
- Postal code: 4117
- Area code: 54

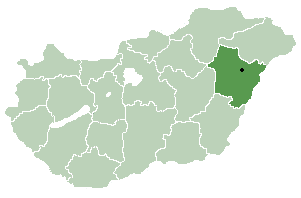
Location of Hajdú-Bihar county in Hungary

Told is a village in Hajdú-Bihar county in the Northern Great Plain region of eastern Hungary.

== Geography ==
Told consists of an area of 14.91 km^{2} (6 sq mi) and has a population of 306 people (2015).
