= Mezőpeterd =

- Coat of arms

- Location within Hungary
- Coordinates: 47°09′58″N 21°37′08″E
- Country: Hungary
- County: Hajdú-Bihar

Area
  - Total: 18.23 km^{2} (7.04 sq mi)

Population (2015)
  - Total: 599
  - Density: 32.9/km^{2} (85/sq mi)
- Time zone: UTC+1 (CET)
  - Summer (DST): UTC+2 (CEST)
- Postal code: 4118
- Area code: 54

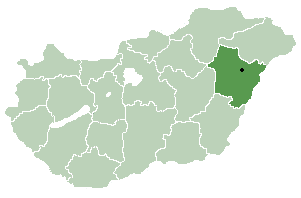
Location of Hajdú-Bihar county in Hungary

Mezőpeterd (Romanian: Peterd) is a village in Hajdú-Bihar county, in the Northern Great Plain region of eastern Hungary.

== Geography ==
It covers an area of 18.23 km^{2} (7 sq mi) and has a population of 599 people (2015).
