= Körösszakál =

Coordinates: 47°01′N 21°36′E

Körösszakál Săcal
- Interactive map of Körösszakál
- Country: Hungary
- County: Hajdú-Bihar

Area
  - Total: 15.02 km^{2} (5.80 sq mi)

Population (2015)
  - Total: 833
  - Density: 55.6/km^{2} (144/sq mi)
- Time zone: UTC+1 (CET)
  - Summer (DST): UTC+2 (CEST)
- Postal code: 4136
- Area code: 54

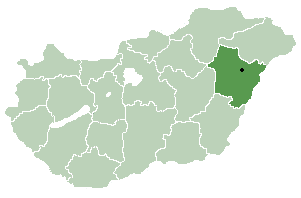
Location of Hajdú-Bihar county in Hungary

Körösszakál (Romanian: Săcal) is a village in Hajdú-Bihar county, in the Northern Great Plain region of eastern Hungary. The village is situated along the bank of the Sebes-Körös.

== Geography ==
It covers an area of 15.02 km^{2} (6 sq mi) and has a population of 833 people (2015).
