= Bedő =

Coordinates: 47°9′49.9″N 21°45′3.06″E

Bedő Bedeu
- Coat of arms
- Interactive map of Bedő
- Country: Hungary
- County: Hajdú-Bihar

Area
  - Total: 10.2 km^{2} (3.9 sq mi)

Population (2001)
  - Total: 307
  - Density: 30.1/km^{2} (78/sq mi)
- Time zone: UTC+1 (CET)
  - Summer (DST): UTC+2 (CEST)
- Postal code: 4128
- Area code: 54

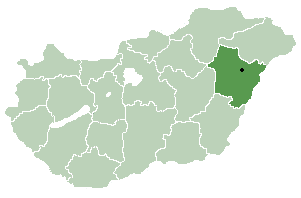
Location of Hajdú-Bihar County in Hungary

Bedő (Romanian: Bedeu) is a village in Hajdú-Bihar County, in the Northern Great Plain region of eastern Hungary.

== Geography ==
It covers an area of 10.2 km^{2} (4 sq mi) and has a population of 307 people (2001).
