= Körösszegapáti =

Coordinates: 47°02′N 21°38′E

Körösszegapáti Apateu
- Interactive map of Körösszegapáti
- Country: Hungary
- County: Hajdú-Bihar

Area
  - Total: 45.85 km^{2} (17.70 sq mi)

Population (2015)
  - Total: 1,012
  - Density: 22.1/km^{2} (57/sq mi)
- Time zone: UTC+1 (CET)
  - Summer (DST): UTC+2 (CEST)
- Postal code: 4135
- Area code: 54

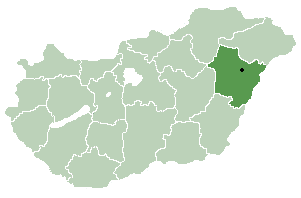
Location of Hajdú-Bihar county in Hungary

Körösszegapáti (Romanian: Apateu) is a village in Hajdú-Bihar County, in the Northern Great Plain region of eastern Hungary.

== Geography ==
It covers an area of 45.85 km^{2} (18 sq mi) and has a population of 1012 people (2015).
