= Vekerd =

Coordinates: 47°06′N 21°24′E

Vekerd Vecherd
- Coat of arms
- Interactive map of Vekerd
- Country: Hungary
- County: Hajdú-Bihar

Area
  - Total: 7.41 km^{2} (2.86 sq mi)

Population (2015)
  - Total: 135
  - Density: 18.2/km^{2} (47/sq mi)
- Time zone: UTC+1 (CET)
  - Summer (DST): UTC+2 (CEST)
- Postal code: 4143
- Area code: 54

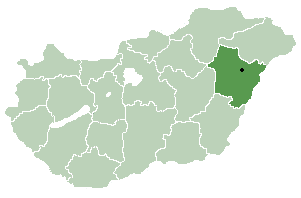
Location of Hajdú-Bihar county in Hungary

Vekerd (Romanian: Vecherd) is a village in Hajdú-Bihar County, in the Northern Great Plain region of eastern Hungary.

== Geography ==
It covers an area of 7.41 km^{2} (3 sq mi) and has a population of 135 people (2015).

== See also ==
- Regestrum Varadiense Hungarian: Váradi Regestrum (hu)
