= Hungary–Romania border =

International border

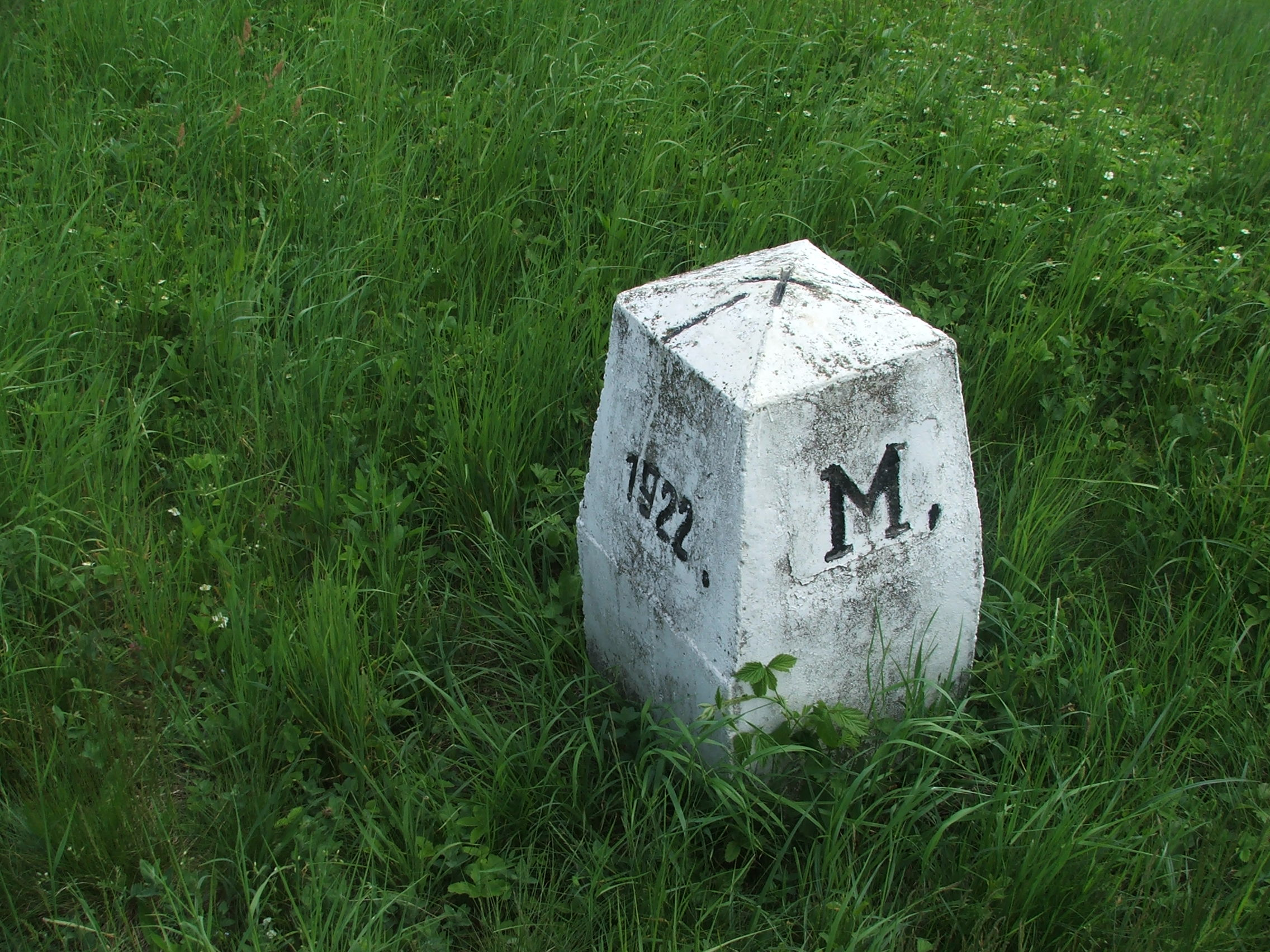
- Border marker between Hungary and Romania at Csenger

Characteristics
- Entities: Hungary Romania
- Length: 448 km (278 mi)

History
- Established: 1920; Signing of the Treaty of Trianon at the end of the World War I
- Current shape: 1947; Paris Peace Treaties
- Treaties: Treaty of Trianon (1920); Second Vienna Award (1940); Paris Peace Treaties (1947)

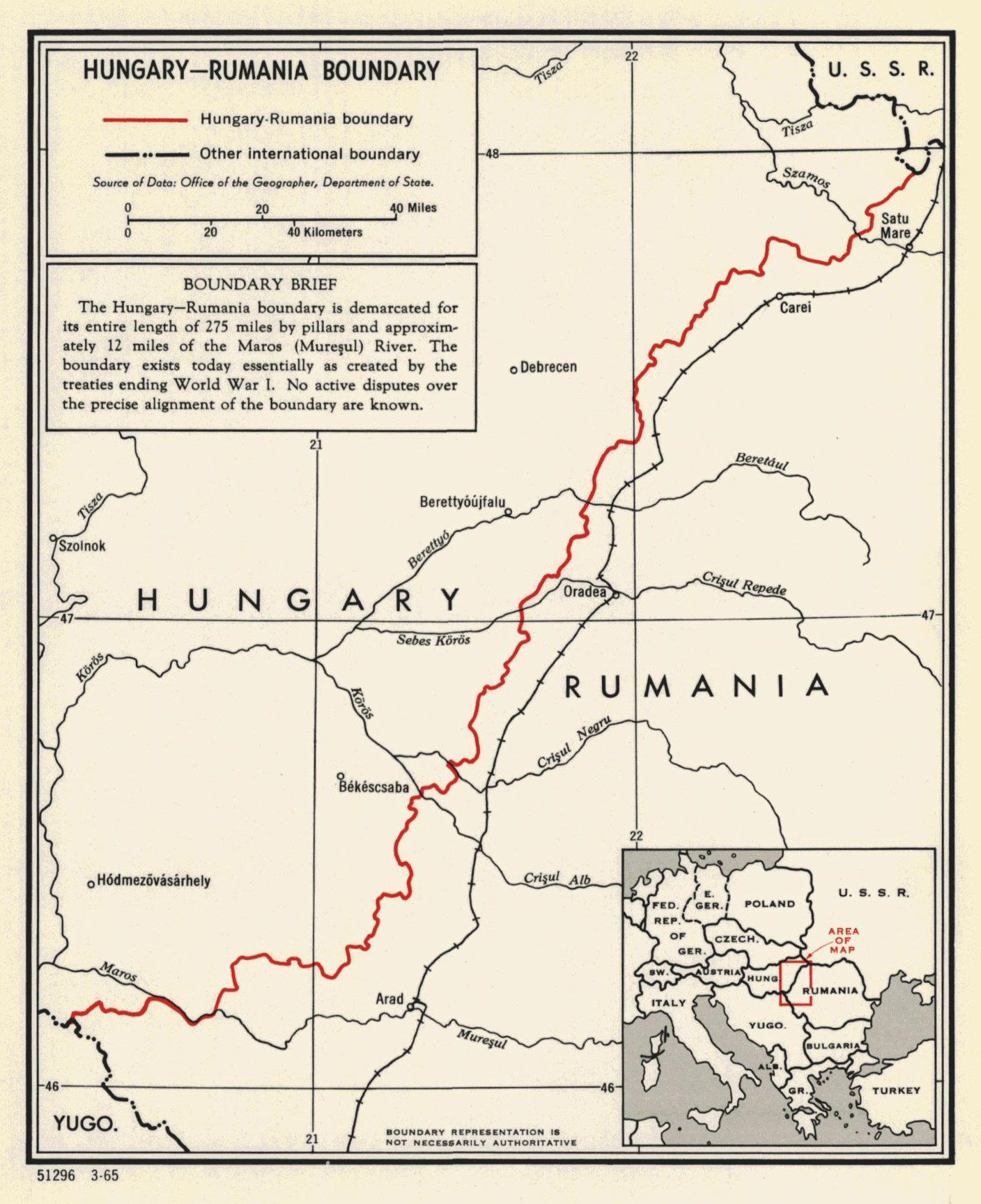

The Hungary–Romania border (Hungarian: Magyar–Román Államhatár; Romanian: Frontiera între Ungaria și România) refers to the state border between Hungary and Romania. It was established in 1920 by an international commission, the "Lord Commission", presided over by geographers including Emmanuel de Martonne and Robert Ficheux, and historians Robert William Seton-Watson and Ernest Denis. The border was set by the Treaty of Trianon which was signed on 4 June 1920.

The border has been stable since the end of the Second World War, when it received its current shape, and is no longer officially in dispute between the countries. In the current form, the border is about 448 kilometers long, or about 278 miles. It is demarcated by pillars, and about 20 kilometers of the border are marked by the Mureș River ("Maros" in Hungarian).

At the moment, the border is an internal border of the European Union, having once been an external border until Hungary's accession to the alliance on 1 May 2004. Romania followed suit, and became a member state of the European Union on 1 January 2007. Both countries later joined the Schengen Area (Hungary on 21 December 2007 and Romania on 1 January 2025), easing travel between the two.

== History ==
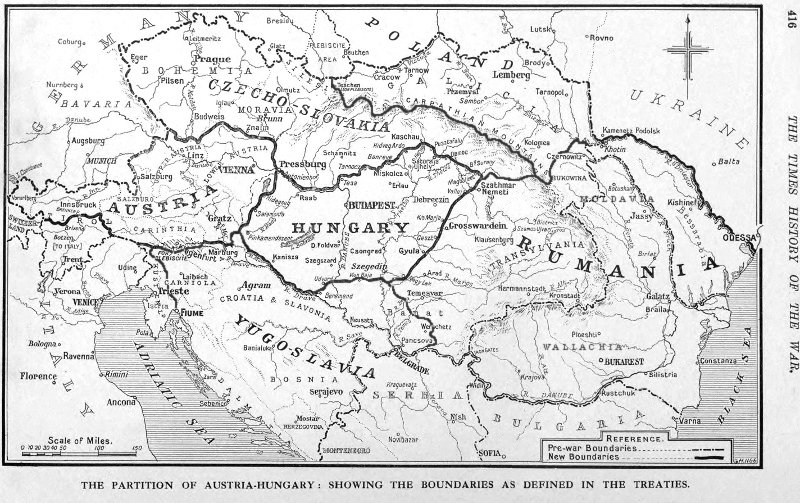
New borders of Austria-Hungary after the treaties of Trianon and Saint Germain. (1919–1920), showing portions transferred to Romania.

Prior to World War I, the eastern and southern Carpathian Mountains formed a natural border between the Austro-Hungarian Empire and Romania.

Hungary and Romania became belligerents in World War I as Romania entered the war in 1916 on the side of the Allies. During that war the part of Transylvania south of the Maros (Mureș) and east of the Szamos (Someș) had been occupied by Romania forces at the time of the cease-fire agreement of Belgrade signed on 13 November 1918. On 1 December 1918, the Great National Assembly of Alba Iulia declared union with the Kingdom of Romania. Subsequently, the Romanian forces moved further into Hungary and occupied Budapest from August to mid-November 1919.

The Treaty of Trianon finalized the armistice between the Allies and Hungary. In the treaty Romania recovered all of Transylvania (including parts of Maramureș, Banat and Crișana),

Romania's territorial losses in the summer of 1940, showing Northern Transylvania being ceded to the Kingdom of Hungary

Briefly during World War II, Northern Transylvania (including part of Maramureș and Crișana) was returned to Hungary under the Second Vienna Award in 1940. In 1944 as World War II drew to a close and Romania joined the war against Germany, the Allies agreed de facto to the Trianon boundaries, and this was confirmed at the Paris Peace Conference in 1946, and by the subsequent peace treaties formalized in 1947.

== Geography ==
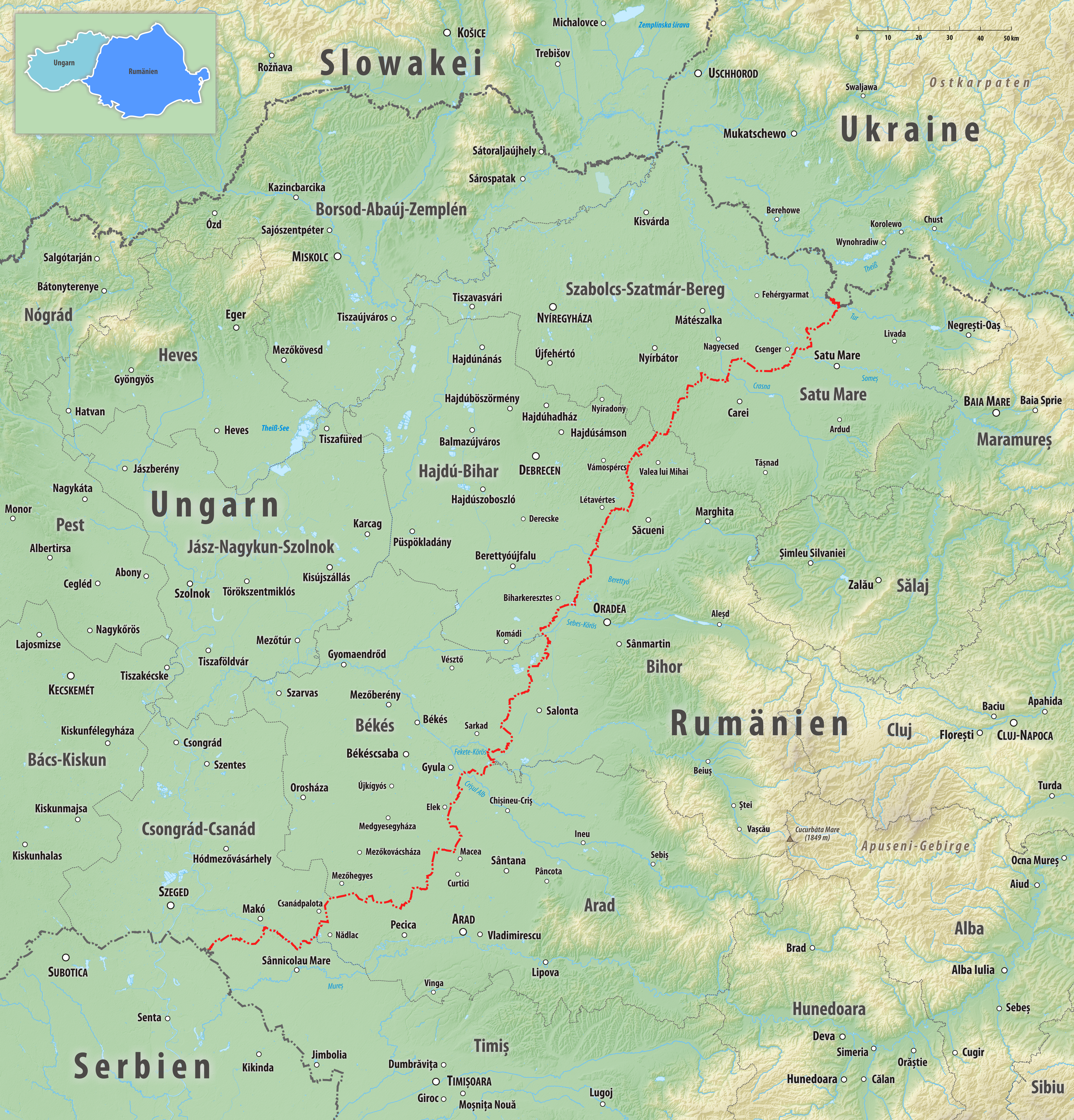
Hungarian–Romanian border (red)

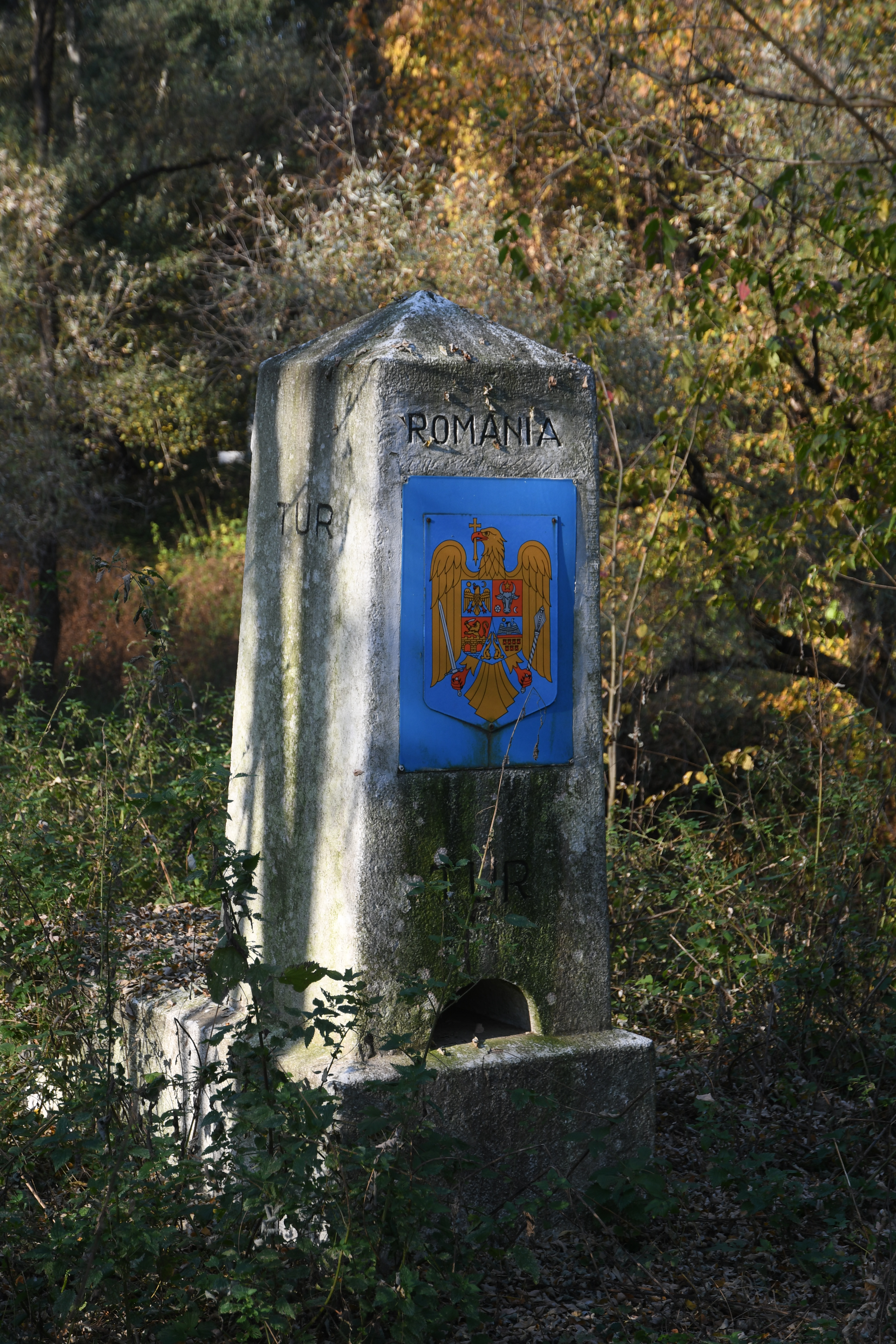
Romania Border Monument at the tripoint with Hungary and Ukraine on the banks of the river Tur. Located in forest.

The Hungarian–Romanian border begins at a tripoint located in the historical region of the Banat, 15 km (9.3 mi) south-east of the Hungarian town of Szeged, where the border between Hungary and Serbia intersects the land border between Romania and Serbia. It generally runs south-south-westwards/north-north-eastwards across the Pannonian Basin to another tripoint located on the Tur river, 16 km (9.9 mi) north of the Romanian town of Satu Mare, where the Hungarian-Ukrainian border intersects the land border between Romania and Ukraine.

=== Counties along the border ===
Both countries use counties as the second form of administrative division. Four Hungarian and four Romanian counties sit along the border.

==== Hungarian counties ====
From north to south, the Hungarian counties bordering Romania are:

- Szabolcs–Szatmár–Bereg, bordering the Romanian counterparts Satu Mare and Bihor (narrowly) counties.
- Hajdú–Bihar, bordering the Romanian counterpart Bihor county.
- Békés, bordering the Romanian counterparts Bihor and Arad counties almost evenly.
- Csongrád-Csanád, bordering the Romanian counterparts Arad (narrowly) and Timiș counties.

==== Romanian counties ====
From north to south, the Romanian counties bordering Hungary are:

- Satu Mare, bordering the Hungarian counterpart Szabolcs–Szatmár–Bereg county
- Bihor, bordering the Hungarian counterparts Szabolcs–Szatmár–Bereg (narrowly), Hajdú–Bihar and Békés counties.
- Arad, bordering the Hungarian counterparts Békés and Csongrád-Csanád (narrowly) counties.
- Timiș, bordering the Hungarian counterpart Csongrád-Csanád county.

== Border crossings ==
Hungarian and Romanian boundary markers

=== Road ===
Hungary checkpoint	(Romania) Romanian checkpoint	Opened	Type of road	Route in Hungary	Route in Romania	Notes
Garbolc	Bercu	October 2013	local road	41134	Dj194	Planned after Romania joining the Schengen Area
Zajta	Peleș		local road	41135	DC63	Temporary crossing
Csengersima	Dorolț (Petea)		main road	49	DN19A	
Csenger	Oar	planned	highway	M49	A 14	planned highway
Vállaj	Urziceni		local/main road	4915	DN1F	
Ömböly	Horea			49133	Dj196C	Planned after Romania joining the Schengen Area
Nyírábrány	Valea lui Mihai		main road	48	DN19C	
Bagamér	Șimian (Voivozi)				DC7	Temporary crossing
Létavértes	Săcuieni		local/main road	4814	DN19D	
Pocsaj	Roșiori				DC19	Temporary crossing
Nagykereki	Borș II	4 September 2020	highway	M4	A 3	Part of E60 / E79
Ártánd	Borș		main road	42	DN1	
Körösnagyharsány	Cheresig			42156	Dj797	Planned after Romania joining the Schengen Area
Méhkerék	Salonta		local/main road	4252	DN79B	
Gyula (Dénesmajor)	Iermata Neagră		local road	42146	DC119	Temporary crossing
Gyula	Vărșand		main road	44	DN79A	
Elek	Grăniceri		local road	4435	Dj709B	Temporary crossing
Dombegyház	Variașu Mic	11 December 2013	local road	4439	Dj709C	Planned after Romania joining the Schengen Area
Battonya	Pecica (Turnu)		local/main road	4455	DN7B	
Csanádpalota	Nădlac II	13 July 2015	highway	M43	A 1	Part of E68
Nagylak	Nădlac		main road	43	DN7	
Kiszombor	Cenad		main road	431	DN6	vehicle only <7,5t

=== Rail ===
All railway crossings are standard gauge. As of June 2019, all railway crossings have passenger traffic.

- Tiborszállás – Carei; last train: 9 December 2023
- Nyírábrány – Valea lui Mihai
- Biharkeresztes – Episcopia Bihor; electrified 25 kV 50 Hz
- Kötegyán – Salonta
- Lőkösháza – Curtici; electrified 25 kV 50 Hz, double-track line

== See also ==
- Hungary–Romania relations
- Union of Hungary and Romania
