= Hajdú-Bihar County 3rd constituency =

Constituency in Hungary (2012-)

Hajdú-Bihar County 3rd constituency (Debrecen)
- Constituency for the National Assembly
- Location of Hajdú-Bihar county 03 within Hajdú-Bihar county

- Location of Hajdú-Bihar county within Hungary
- County: Hajdú-Bihar
- Electorate: 76,178 (2018)
- Major settlements: Debrecen

Current constituency
- Created: 2011
- Party: Tisza Party
- Member: László Csák
- Elected: 2026

The 3rd constituency of Hajdú-Bihar County (Hungarian: Hajdú-Bihar megyei 03. számú országgyűlési egyéni választókerület) is one of the single member constituencies of the National Assembly, the national legislature of Hungary. The constituency standard abbreviation: Hajdú-Bihar 03. OEVK.

Since 2026, it has been represented by László Csák of the Tisza Party.

== Geography ==
The 3rd constituency is located in north-eastern part of Hajdú-Bihar County.

=== List of municipalities ===
The constituency includes the following municipalities:

1. Álmosd
2. Bagamér
3. Bocskaikert
4. Debrecen: Northeastern part of the city.
5. Fülöp
6. Hajdúhadház
7. Hajdúsámson
8. Kokad
9. Létavértes
10. Nyírábrány
11. Nyíracsád
12. Nyíradony
13. Nyírmártonfalva
14. Téglás
15. Újléta
16. Vámospércs

== Members ==
The constituency was first represented by László Tasó of the Fidesz from 2014, and he was re-elected in 2018 and 2022. In the 2026 election, László Csák of the Tisza Party was elected representative.

Election	Member	Party	%	Ref.
2014	László Tasó	Fidesz	51.64	
2018	László Tasó	Fidesz	58.16	
2022	László Tasó	Fidesz	63.51	
2026	László Csák	TISZA	50.92	
