= Main road 4 (Hungary) =

Road in Hungary

Main road 4
- 4-es főút
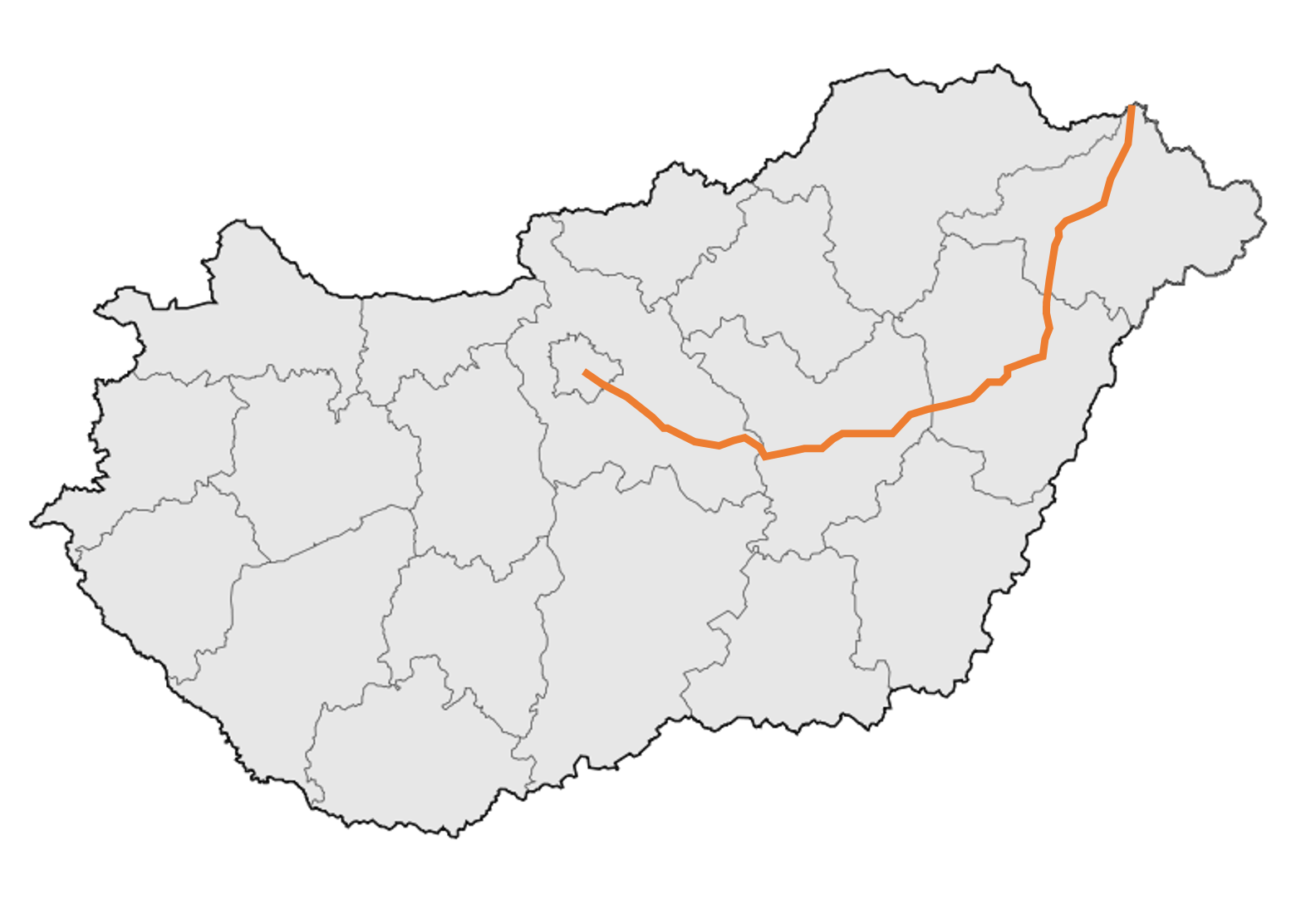

Route information
- Part of E60 / E573
- Length: 352 km (219 mi)

Major junctions
- From: Budapest
- 406 near Üllő; 405 in Albertirsa; 311, 441 in Cegléd; 401 near Abony; 406 / 32, 402, 442 in Szolnok; 46 in Törökszentmiklós; 34 near Fegyvernek; 42 in Püspökladány; M35, 35, 47, 48, 33 471 in Debrecen; 354 near Hajdúhadház; M3, 44, 38 in Nyíregyháza; 403 in Nyírtura; 381 in Kisvárda
- To: Záhony; M 06 border with Ukraine

Location
- Country: Hungary
- Counties: Pest, Jász-Nagykun-Szolnok, Hajdú-Bihar, Szabolcs-Szatmár-Bereg
- Major cities: Budapest, Vecsés, Üllő, Monor, Pilis, Albertirsa, Cegléd, Abony, Szolnok, Törökszentmiklós, Fegyvernek, Kenderes, Kisújszállás, Karcag, Püspökladány, Kaba, Hajdúszoboszló, Debrecen, Hajdúhadház, Téglás, Újfehértó, Nyíregyháza, Ajak, Kisvárda, Záhony

Highway system
- Roads in Hungary; Highways; Main roads; Local roads

The Main road 4 is a west–east direction First class main road across the Alföld region of Hungary, that connects Budapest to the biggest eastern Hungarian cities: Szolnok, Debrecen, Nyíregyháza towards the border of Ukraine, facilitating access from the capital city of Hungary to the Ukrainian border. The road is 352 kilometres (219 mi) long, this is the longest Hungarian main road. Most of the traffic was taken over by the M4 expressway until Püspökladány.

The road, as well as all other main roads in Hungary, is managed and maintained by Magyar Közút, state owned company.

== See also ==
- Roads in Hungary
- Transport in Hungary
