= Main road 34 (Hungary) =

Road in Hungary

Main road 34
- 34-es főút
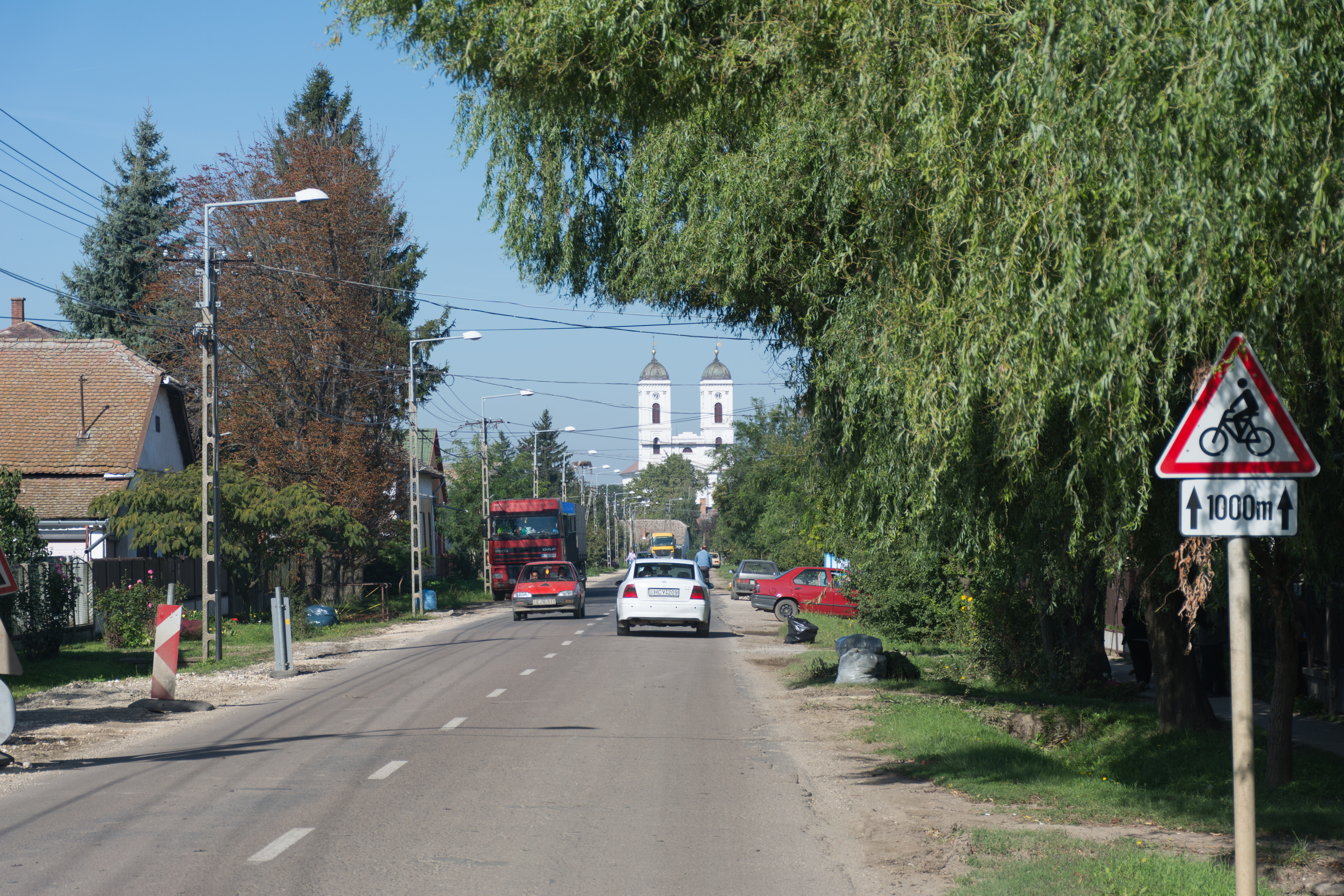

Route information
- Length: 55 km (34 mi)

Major junctions
- From: 33 in Tiszafüred
- To: 4 in Fegyvernek

Location
- Country: Hungary
- Counties: Jász-Nagykun-Szolnok
- Major cities: Tiszafüred, Kunhegyes, Fegyvernek

Highway system
- Roads in Hungary; Highways; Main roads; Local roads

The Main road 34 is a northeast–southwest direction Secondary class main road in the Nagykunság (Alföld) region of Hungary that connects the Main road 33 to the Main road 4 and 406, facilitating access from Tiszafüred to Fegyvernek-Szapárfalu. The road is 55 km long.

The road, as well as all other main roads in Hungary, is managed and maintained by Magyar Közút, state owned company.

== See also ==
- Roads in Hungary
- Transport in Hungary
