= László Csák =

Hungarian politician

Member of the National Assembly
- Incumbent
- Assumed office 9 May 2026
- Preceded by: László Tasó
- Constituency: Hajdú-Bihar 3rd

Personal details
- Party: Tisza

László Csák is a Hungarian politician who was elected member of the National Assembly in 2026 representing the Fejér County 2nd constituency. He previously worked as a mathematics and physics teacher.
