= Main road 42 (Hungary) =

Road in Hungary

Main road 42
- 42-es főút
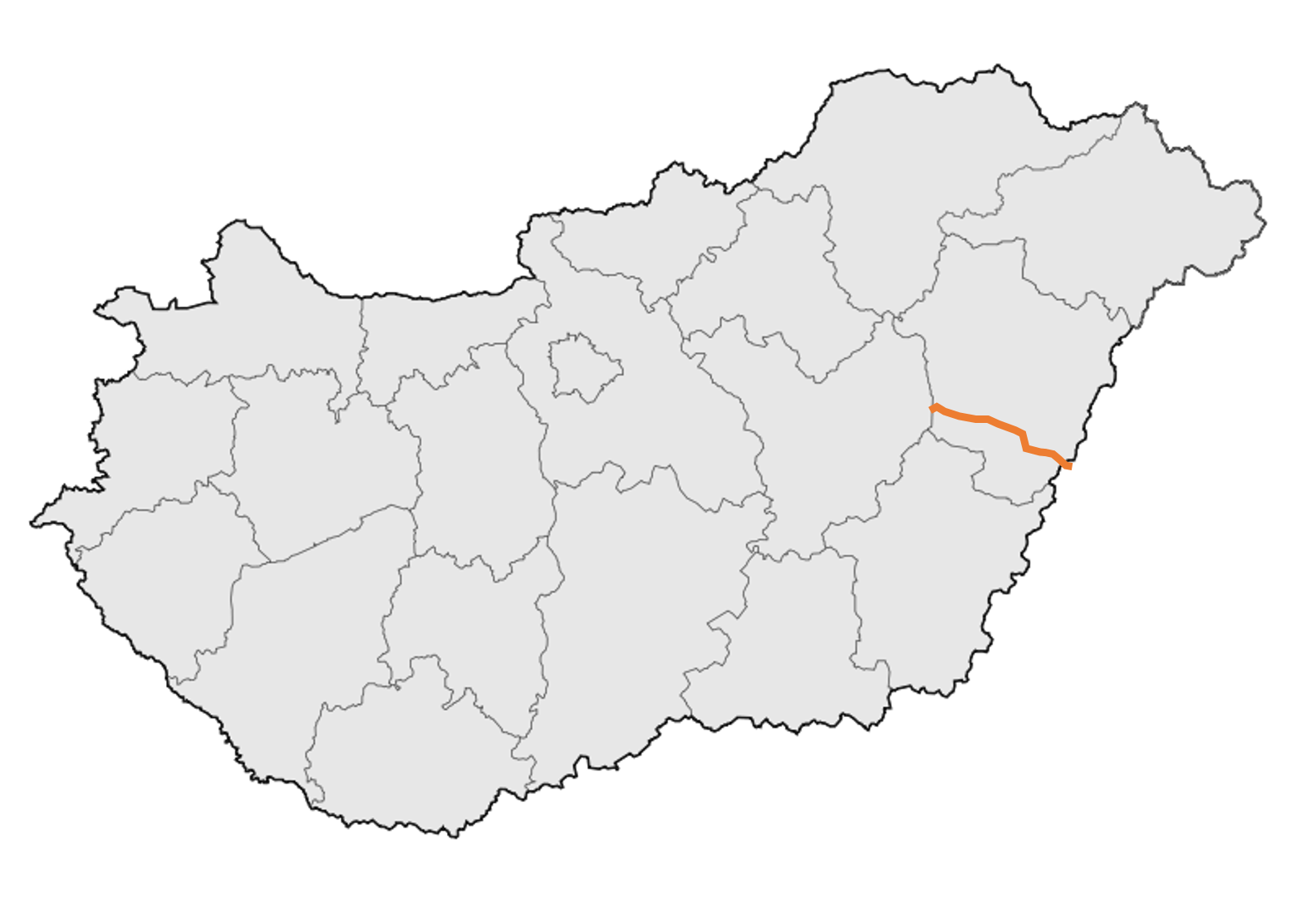

Route information
- Length: 59 km (37 mi)

Major junctions
- From: 4 in Püspökladány
- 47 in Berettyóújfalu; 427 near Berettyóújfalu
- To: Ártánd; DN1 border with Romania

Location
- Country: Hungary
- Counties: Hajdú-Bihar
- Major cities: Püspökladány, Berettyóújfalu, Biharkeresztes

Highway system
- Roads in Hungary; Highways; Main roads; Local roads

The Main road 42 (Hungarian: 42-es főút) is a west–east direction First class main road in Hungary, that connects Püspökladány (the Main road 4 change) with Ártánd (the border of Romania). The road is 59 kilometres (37 mi) long. Most of the traffic was taken over by the M4 expressway.

The road, as well as all other main roads in Hungary, is managed and maintained by Magyar Közút, state owned company.

== See also ==
- Roads in Hungary
