= M4 motorway (Hungary) =

Road in Hungary

M4 motorway
- M4-es autópálya
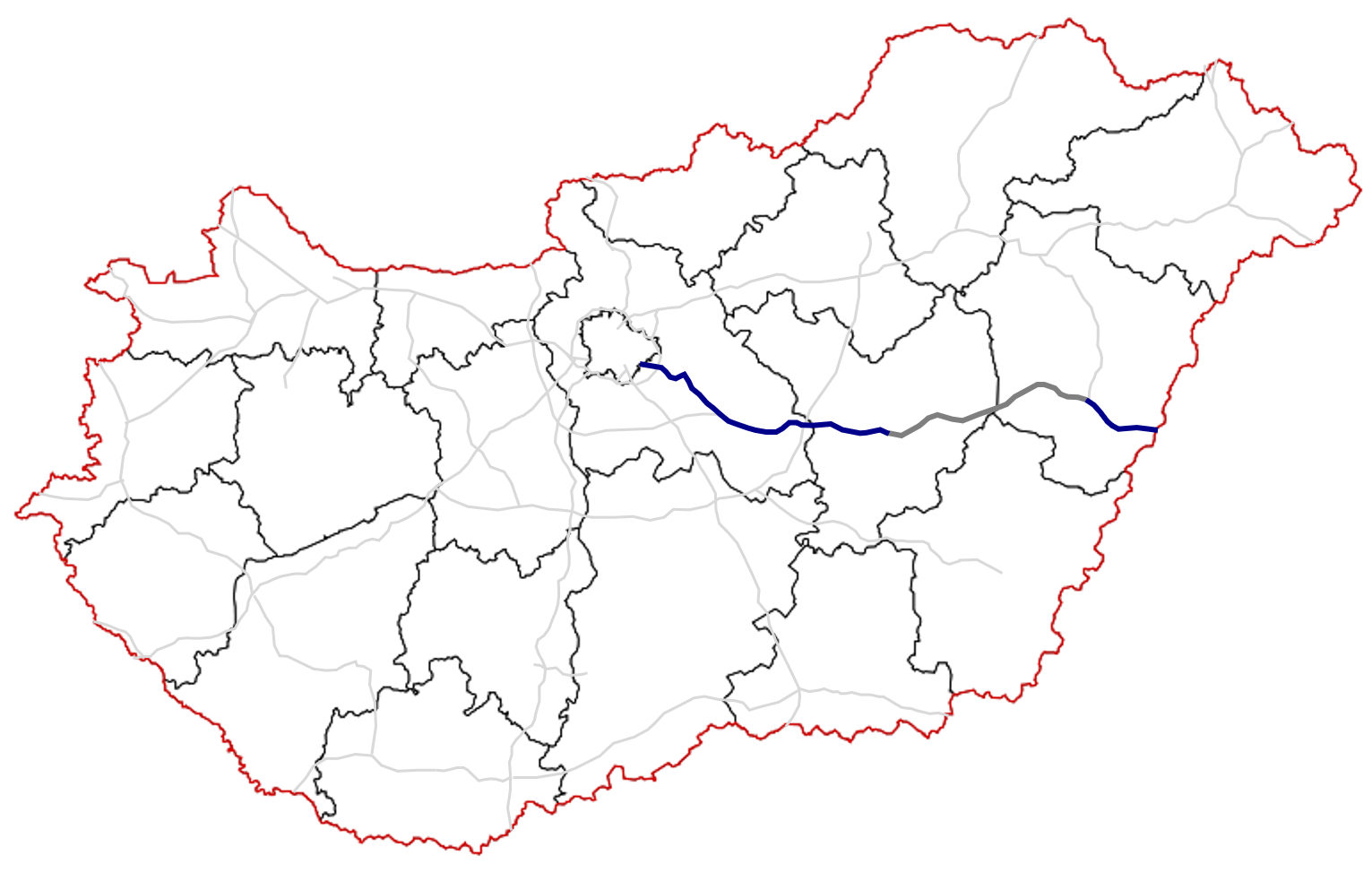
- in use under construction planned

Route information
- Part of E60 / E79
- Length: 167 km (104 mi) 223 km (139 mi) planned

Major junctions
- From: M0 in Budapest
- M8 near Szolnok; M35 near Berettyóújfalu
- To: A 3 at Nagykereki

Location
- Country: Hungary
- Counties: Pest, Jász-Nagykun-Szolnok, Hajdú-Bihar
- Major cities: Budapest, Szolnok, Püspökladány

Highway system
- Roads in Hungary; Highways; Main roads; Local roads

M4 is a Hungarian expressway (constructed to motorway standards on its final section before reaching the border) which will, upon completion, connect Budapest to Oradea and further Romanian cities. The route will travel in Hungary through Cegléd, Szolnok, Karcag, Püspökladány, Berettyóújfalu, and Nagykereki before reaching the Romanian border.

== History, finished sections and future plans ==
The road's origins can be traced much further back in time - as far back as 1974, when the first section of the future motorway was opened. This section, from Albertirsa to Cegléd, served to bypass the older, congested Route 40, that passed through these towns. This was extended in 2005 to bypass Abony and Szolnok. The same year, the Törökszentmiklós bypass opened. On 6 July 2011, a bypass also opened at Kisújszállás. Most of these sections were only 1 lane per direction.

The 10 km long Vecsés-Üllő bypass opened in 2004, completed up to expressway standards. The section also helped ease accessing the Liszt Ferenc International Airport. However, this had left a gap between Albertirsa and Üllő, and the old road going through Monor soon became a bottleneck. The missing 29 kilometer long section of M4 was completed on February 7, 2020.

The section going south of Szolnok was found to be unsuitable to upgrade to motorway status, so on 16 September 2013, a contract was signed regarding the new route of the motorway. This route would go northwards of Szolnok, crossing the Tisza rivers, and shortening the route of the motorway. Construction contract was awarded to Strabag, with the estimated costs reaching 100 billion Hungarian Forints. Since the motorway passes through an environmental area, protective fencing was to be installed on the new sections from Üllő towards Törökszentmiklós. Whilst this section was supposed to open by 2016, construction work was stopped on 30 June 2015, to investigate the companies who were building the road. Apparently, the project was submitted to the EU to be supported in 2013, but it never received approval. Another issue was the huge cost of the route - 4 Billion HUF per kilometer. The work on this section restarted in 2018, and it opened to traffic in 2022.

A 4 kilometer stretch of M4, near Berettyóújfalu, was inaugurated on December 20, 2018. This section serves to link the M35 motorway to Route 47.

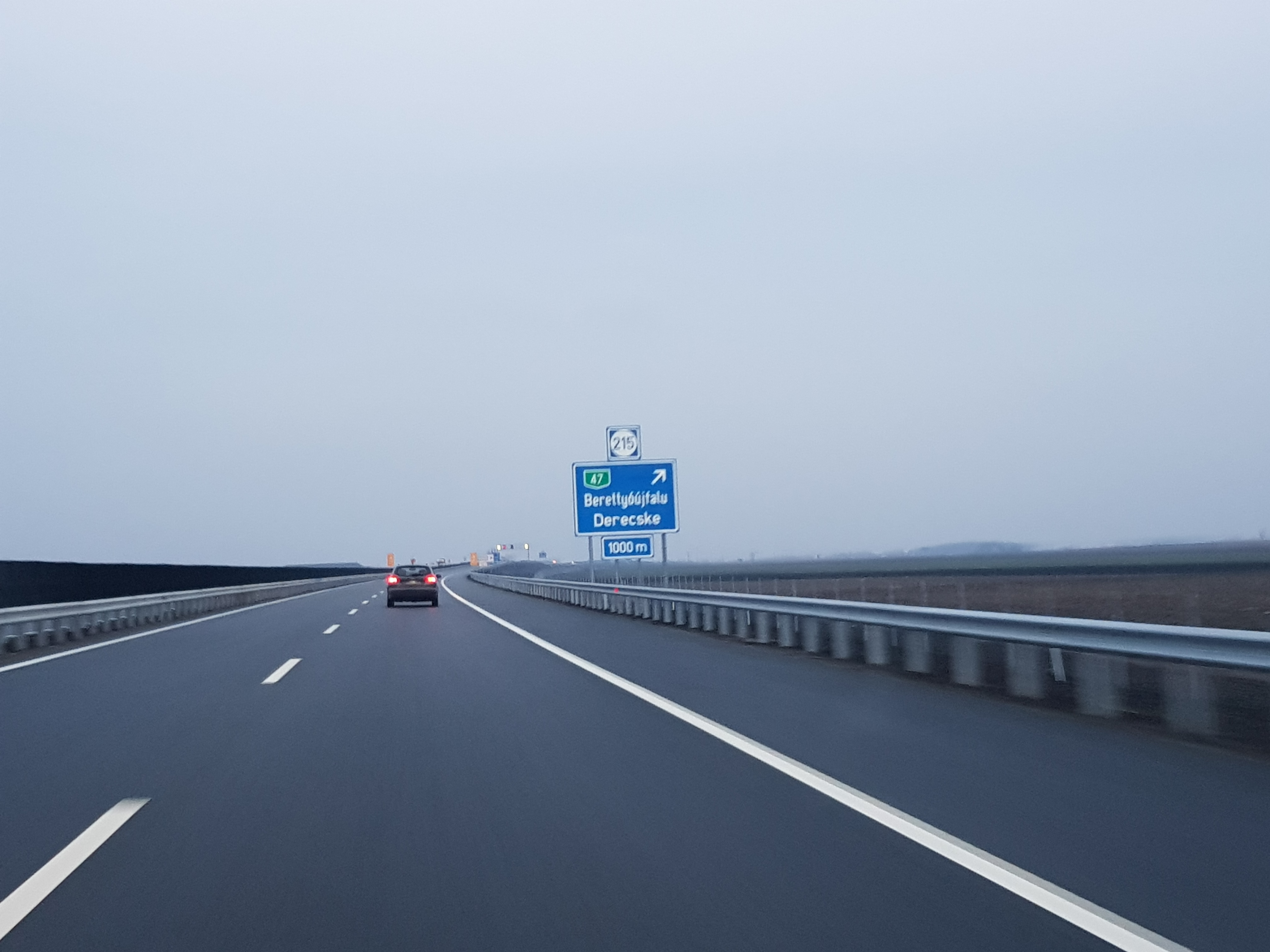
The M4 as seen heading towards the Romanian border, near Derecske, 27 December 2018

In 2019, a section near Cegléd section was upgraded to a dual carriageway, but it only reached expressway status after the connecting section between Cegléd and Abony was completed in the summer of 2020.

Works at the other end of the planned motorway started in 2016, specifically on the Berettyóújfalu-Nagykereki section, which would connect to the Romanian A3 motorway, towards Oradea, Cluj, Târgu Mureș and Bucharest. However, just like the work on the A3 motorway in Romania, construction temporarily stopped due to funding issues. In 2018, Hungary received up to 265 million Euros from the EU Cohesion Funds specifically to complete this section of M4. It was opened on September 4, 2020.

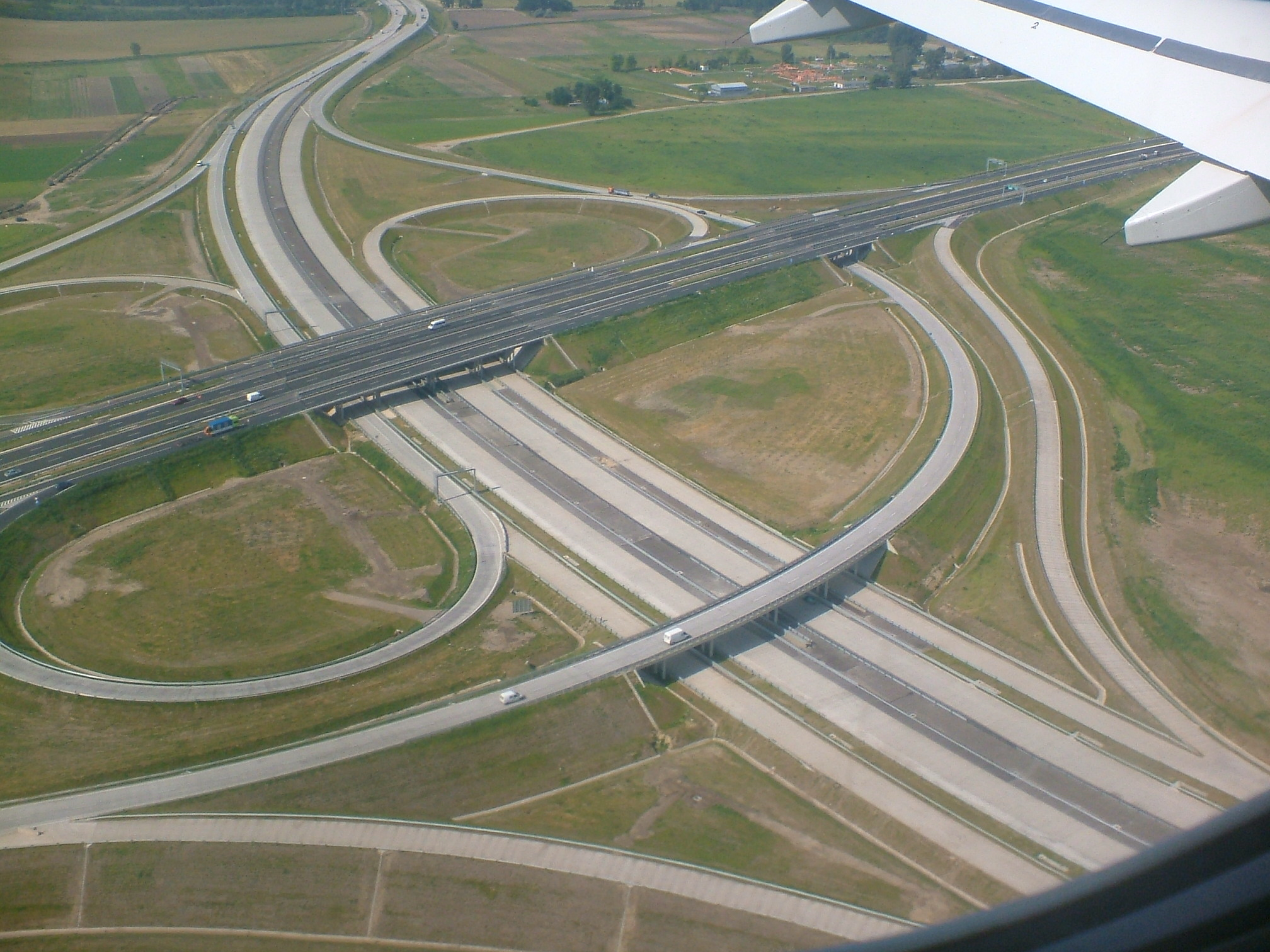
The M0-M4 interchange seen from the air, 20 June 2006. Notice the then-under construction section of the M0.

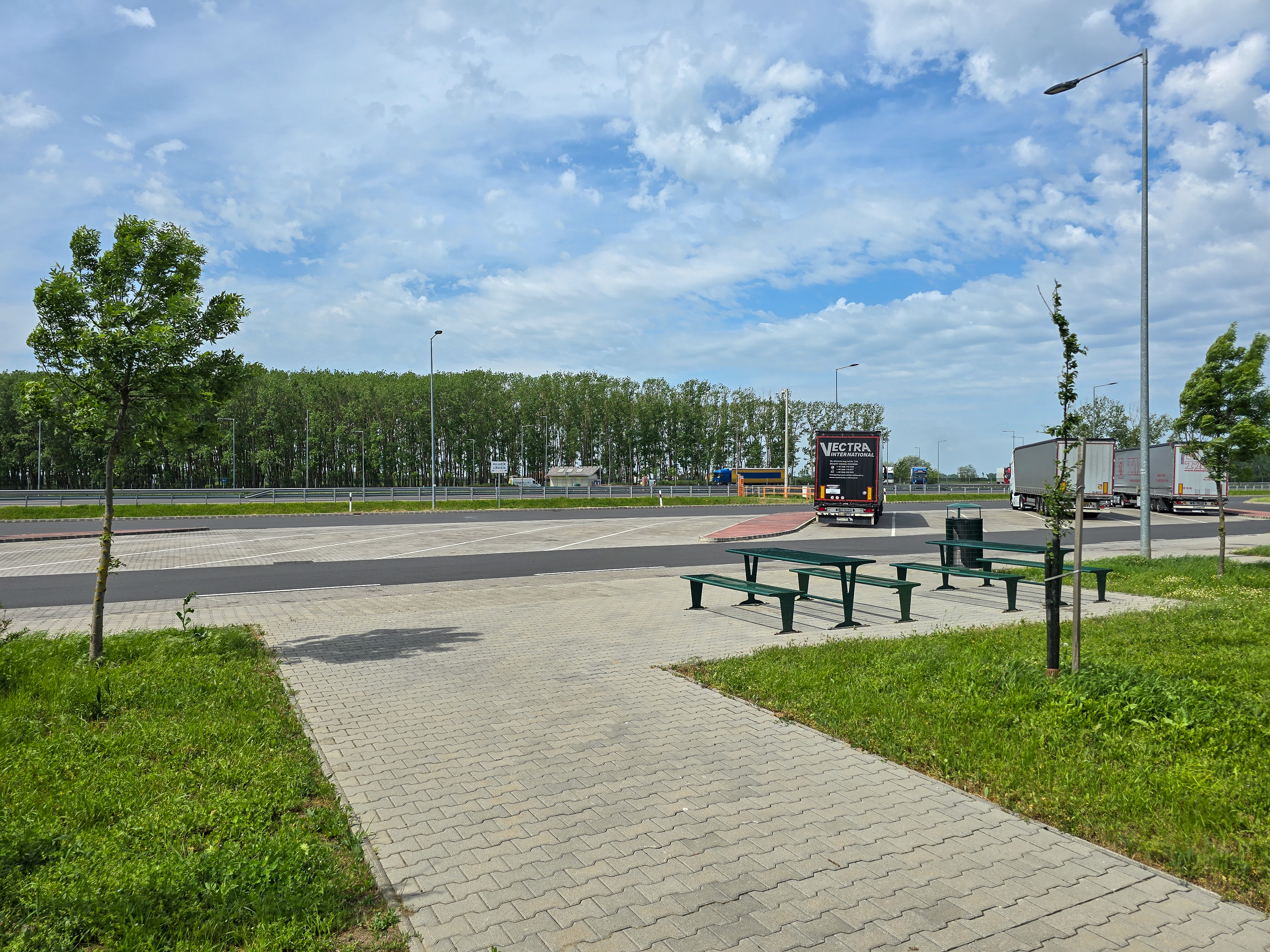
Körtvélyes rest area

Preparatory work has started for the Törökszentmiklós-Kisújszállás-Karcag-Püspökladány-Berettyóújfalu section. This section envisaged an interchange with the M8 motorway, but the procurement procedure was abolished on 26 February 2014, leaving work halted on this section.

== Junctions, exits and rest areas ==
Distance from the Zero Kilometre Stone (Adam Clark Square) in Budapest in kilometres.

- The section between Budapest and Berettyóújfalu is expressway. The maximum speed limit is 110 km/h, with (2x2 lanes).
- The section between Berettyóújfalu and Nagykereki is motorway. The maximum speed limit is 130 km/h, with (2x2 lanes and stop lane).

km		Destinations	Route	Notes
18	Exit	Budapest		Connection to Budapest; Introductory path of M4
19	Exit	Vecsés-nyugat	4	Western connection to Vecsés
21	Exit	Budapest International Airport		
24	Exit	Vecsés-kelet, Ecser	3101	Eastern connection to Vecsés
24	Interchange	M4-M0 interchange (Budapest bypass)	M0 / E60	Connection to Győr, Székesfehérvár, Pécs, Szeged and Nyíregyháza, Vác. The western terminus of European route E60
30	Exit	Üllő, Gyömrő	3124	
35	Exit	Monor-nyugat, Péteri	3111	Western connection to Monor
41	Exit	Monor-kelet, Gomba	3112	Eastern connection to Monor
49	Exit	Pilis, Monorierdő, Káva	4606	
52	Rest area	Gerje rest area		
56	Exit	Albertirsa, Dabas	405	Also serves as a connecting road to M5 / E75
63	Exit	Ceglédbercel	46124	
66	Exit	Cegléd-Öregszőlő		Connection to the Aquapark of Cegléd
69	Rest area	Ceglédi rest area		MOL / MOL +
69	Exit	Cegléd, Tápiószentmárton	3116	
70	Exit	Cegléd, Tápiószele	311	
77	Exit	Abony-nyugat	401	Western connection to Abony
85	Rest area	Abonyi rest area		
89	Exit	Abony-észak, Újszász		Northern connection to Abony
94	Exit	Abony-kelet, Szolnok-nyugat	406	Eastern connection to Abony; Western connection to Szolnok
	Interchange	M4-M8 interchange	M8	Connection to the M8 motorway, towards Kecskemét.
99	Exit	Szolnok-észak, Jászberény	32	Northern connection to Szolnok
101	Bridge	Zagyva (Bridge)		
106	Exit	Szolnok-kelet, Besenyszög		Eastern connection to Szolnok
112	Bridge	Tisza (Bridge)		
115	Rest area	Rest area		
117	Exit	Törökszentmiklós-nyugat, Szajol	4	Western connection to Törökszentmiklós
125	Exit	Törökszentmiklós-kelet	4	Eastern connection to Törökszentmiklós
133	Exit	Fegyvernek, Örményes		
145	Exit	Kisújszállás-nyugat, Kenderes	4	Western connection to Kisújszállás
154	Exit	Kisújszállás-kelet	4	Eastern connection to Kisújszállás
160	Rest area	Rest area		
165	Exit	Karcag, Füzesgyarmat		
180	Exit Rest area	Püspökladány, Báránd; Püspökladányi rest area	42	
190	Exit	Kaba		
197	Rest area	Rest area		
202	Exit	Hajdúszovát, Földes		
208	Rest area	Rest area		
210	Interchange	M4-M35 interchange	M35 / E79	Connection to the M35 motorway, towards Debrecen. The western terminus of European route E79 and of the motorway section. The eastern terminus of the expressway section.
215	Exit	Berettyóújfalu, Derecske	47	
220	Rest area	Körtvélyes rest area		
226	Exit	Gáborján, Váncsod	4815	
230	Rest area	Kengyeles rest area		
237	Exit	Nagykereki, Pocsaj, Biharkeresztes	4808	
242	Border control	Nagykereki (H) – Borș II (RO) border crossing		
A 3 / E60 / E79 → to Oradea, Romania

- Under construction
- Planned section
