= Main road 354 (Hungary) =

Road in Hungary

Main road 354
- 354-es főút
- Northern bypass of Debrecen

Route information
- Part of E573
- Length: 12 km (7.5 mi)
- History: 2010s

Major junctions
- From: 4 in Hajdúhadház
- 35 in Józsa
- To: M35 in Debrecen-észak

Location
- Country: Hungary
- Counties: Hajdú-Bihar
- Major cities: Hajdúhadház, Debrecen

Highway system
- Roads in Hungary; Highways; Main roads; Local roads

The Main road 354 (Hungarian: 354-es főút) is a short bypass direction First class main road near Debrecen, that connects the Main road 4, near Hajdúhadház to the Debrecen-észak junction in M35 motorway. The road is 12 kilometres (7.5 mi) long.

The road, as well as all other main roads in Hungary, is managed and maintained by Magyar Közút, state owned company.

== See also ==
- Roads in Hungary
