= M35 motorway (Hungary) =

Road in Hungary

M35 motorway
- M35-ös autópálya
- Part of Via Carpathia
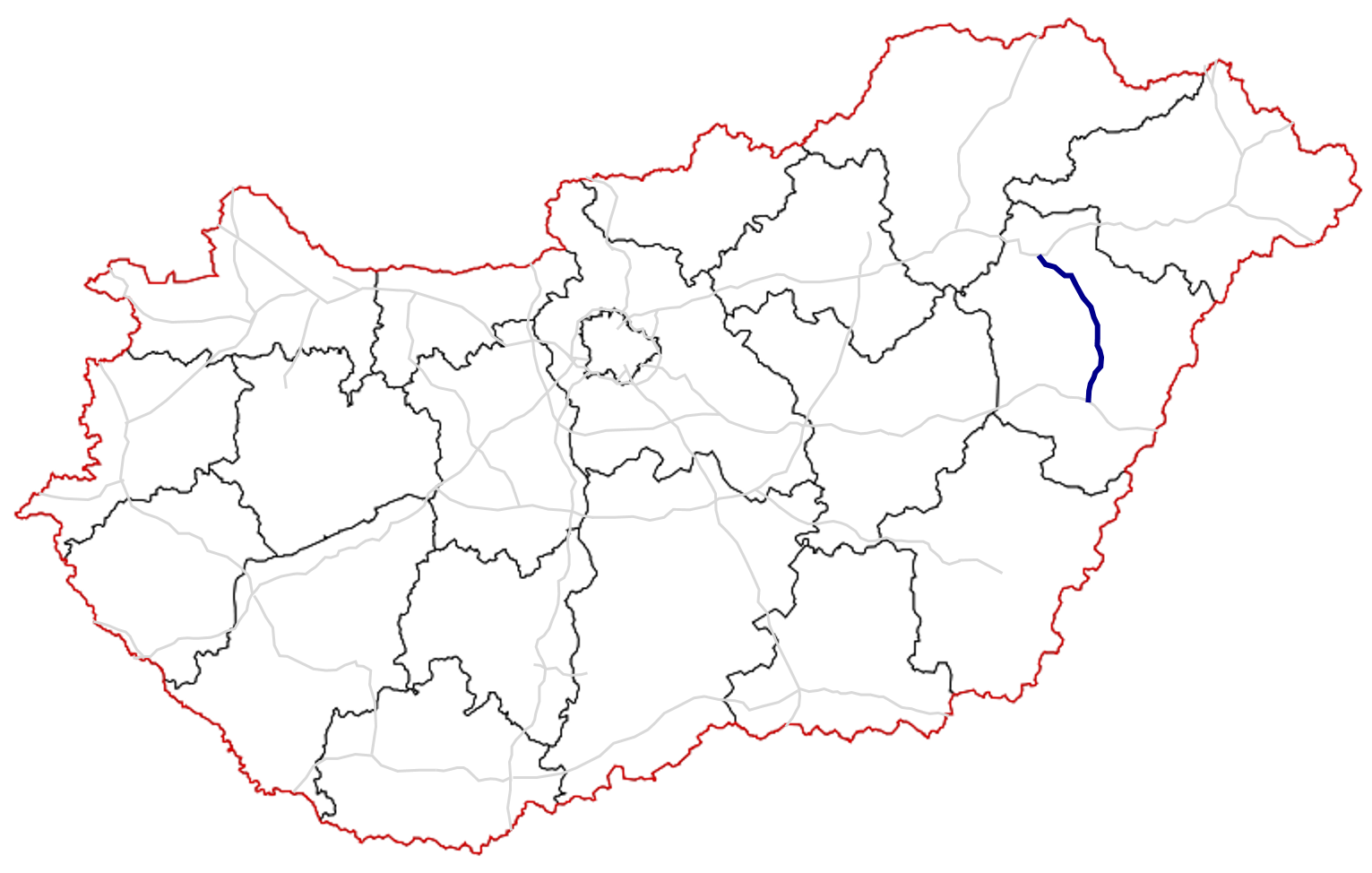
- in use other highways

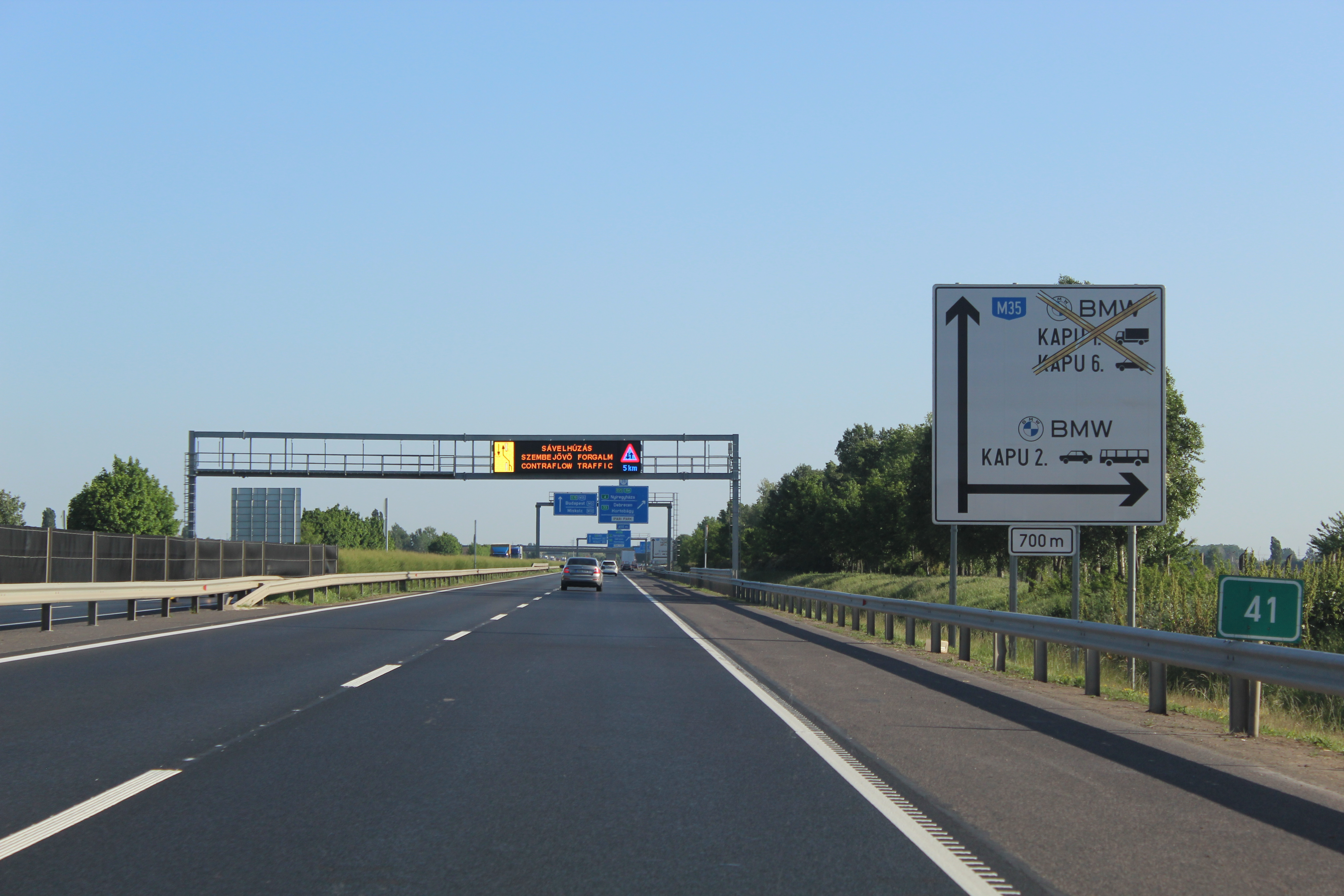
- M35 west of Debrecen, April 2024

Route information
- Part of E79 / E573
- Length: 68.8 km (42.8 mi)
- Existed: 2003–present
- History: Completed: 2018

Major junctions
- From: M3 near Görbeháza
- 354, 33, 4, 481 near Debrecen
- To: M4 near Berettyóújfalu

Location
- Country: Hungary
- Counties: Hajdú-Bihar
- Major cities: Hajdúböszörmény, Debrecen, Berettyóújfalu

Highway system
- Roads in Hungary; Highways; Main roads; Local roads

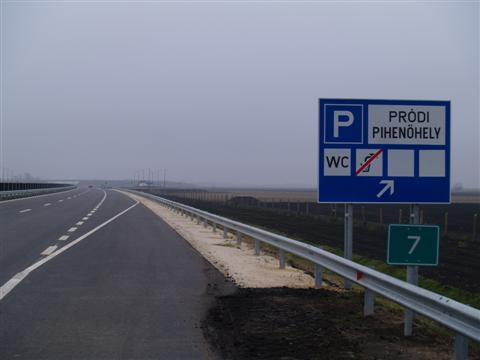
Rest area in Pród

The M35 motorway (Hungarian: M35-ös autópálya) is a 68.8 km (42.8 mi) motorway in eastern Hungary which connects the M3 motorway with the city of Debrecen, providing it with a direct motorway link to the capital, Budapest.

The section bypassing Debrecen was completed in April 2006, and the whole stretch of road was opened to the public on 15 December 2006. The new road reduced driving time between Debrecen and the capital to under 2 hours. The further stretch from Debrecen to the M4 motorway was inaugurated on December 20, 2018.

== Timeline ==
Section	Length	Opened	Notes
Görbeháza (M3) – Debrecen dél	44.0 km (27.34 mi)	15 December 2006	Built between 2003 – 2006, with Debrecen western bypass.
Debrecen dél – Mikepércs	5.43 km (3.37 mi)	13 December 2017	Built between 2015 – 2017.
Mikepércs – Berettyóújfalu (M4)	18.7 km (11.62 mi)	20 December 2018	Built between 2015 – 2018.

== Route description ==
- The route is full length motorway. The maximum speed limit is 130km/h, with (2x2 lane road with stop lane).

County	km	Type	Destination	Notes
Hajdú-Bihar	0	Interchange	M3 / E79 – Budapest, Miskolc (M30) M3 / E579 – Nyíregyháza	The northern terminus of the motorway, E79 route, and Via Carpathia. Kilometrage starting point trumpet interchange
Hajdú-Bihar	7	Rest area	Pródi pihenőhely	parking, and WC pihenőhely means Rest area
Hajdú-Bihar	12	Bridge	Eastern Main Channel híd	híd means Bridge
Hajdú-Bihar	14	Exit	Hajdúnánás / Balmazújváros	
Hajdú-Bihar	19	Rest area	Böszörményi pihenőhely	parking, and WC
Hajdú-Bihar	24	Exit	Hajdúböszörmény / Balmazújváros	Connection to the highway engineers
Hajdú-Bihar	31	Rest area	Józsai pihenőhely	parking, petrol station (Mobil Petrol), café and restaurant
Hajdú-Bihar	33	Exit	BMW factory, Gate 1. and 6. / Debrecen-Józsa	exit under construction
Hajdú-Bihar	38	Exit	BMW factory, Gate 2. / 354 / E573 – Debrecen észak, towards to Main road 4 → Nyíregyháza	Northern end of concurrency with European route E573, and Debrecen bypass. cloverleaf interchange (formerly trumpet interchange when opened) észak means North
Hajdú-Bihar	38	Exit	Main road 33 – Debrecen Centrum / Hortobágy	Centrum means center
Hajdú-Bihar	40	Exit	Debrecen nyugat, Debrecen-Ondód, Ipari park	nyugat means West Ipari park means Industrial area
Hajdú-Bihar	44	Exit	Main road 4 – Debrecen dél 4 / E573 – Hajdúszoboszló, Szolnok	Southern end of concurrency with european route E573. dél means South
Hajdú-Bihar	49	Exit	Main road 481 – Mikepércs, Industrial area	Southern end of Debrecen bypass. Connection to Debrecen International Airport
Hajdú-Bihar	53	Rest area	Mikepércsi pihenőhely	parking, and WC
Hajdú-Bihar	60	Exit	Derecske / Hajdúszovát	
Hajdú-Bihar	63	Rest area	Derecskei pihenőhely	parking, and WC (petrol station in the future)
Hajdú-Bihar	68	Interchange	M4 / E60 – Budapest, Szolnok M4 / E60 / E79 – Nagykereki → Oradea (RO)	The southern terminus of the motorway, E79 route, and Via Carpathia. Incomplete junction: junction only from/to → Nagykereki (Romanian border)
1.000 mi = 1.609 km; 1.000 km = 0.621 mi: Concurrency terminus; Incomplete access; Unopened

== Maintenance ==
The operation and maintenance of the road by Hungarian Concession Infrastructure Development Plc. This activity is provided by this highway engineer.

- near Hajdúböszörmény, kilometre trench 22

== Payment ==
Hungarian system has 2 main type in terms of salary:

1, time-based fee vignettes (E-matrica);

- Cars, vans and motorbikes up to 3.5 tonnes only need to buy a single vignette which costs 6,400 Hungarian forint (Ft) for 10 days, 10,360 Ft for 1 month and 57,260 Ft for a year, from 1 January 2024.

2, county vignettes (Megyei matrica); the highway can be used instead of the national sticker with the following county stickers:

Type of county vignette	Available section
Hajdú-Bihar	full length (0 km – 68 km)

== European Route(s) ==
Name	Route
	68 km	junction (0) – junction (68)
	17 km	Debrecen-dél (44) – Debrecen-észak (37)

== See also ==
- Roads in Hungary
- Transport in Hungary
- International E-road network
