= Main road 46 (Hungary) =

Road in Hungary

Main road 46
- 46-os főút

Route information
- Length: 66 km (41 mi)

Major junctions
- From: 4 in Törökszentmiklós
- 443 in Gyomaendrős
- To: 47 in Mezőberény

Location
- Country: Hungary
- Counties: Jász-Nagykun-Szolnok, Békés
- Major cities: Törökszentmiklós, Mezőtúr, Gyomaendrőd, Mezőberény

Highway system
- Roads in Hungary; Highways; Main roads; Local roads

The Main road 46 is a northwest-southeast direction Secondary class main road in the Tiszántúl, which connection old Market towns in Alföld region of Hungary, that connects the Main road 4 change to the Main road 47, facilitating access from Törökszentmiklós to Mezőberény. The road is 66 km long.

The road, as well as all other main roads in Hungary, is managed and maintained by Magyar Közút, state owned company.

== See also ==
- Roads in Hungary
- Transport in Hungary
