= Valea lui Mihai =

Valea lui Mihai Érmihályfalva
- Town
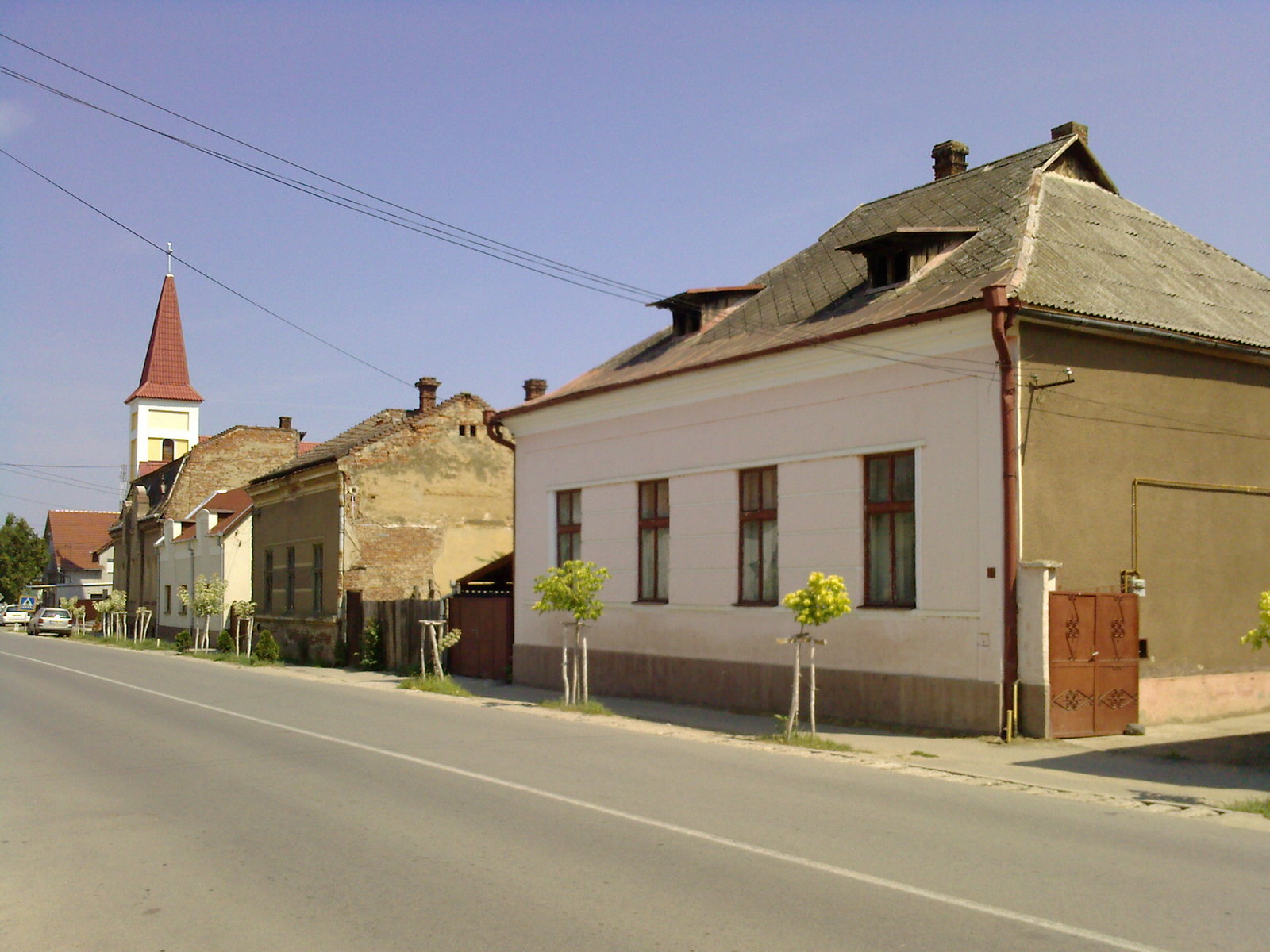

- Coat of arms

- Location in Bihor County

- Location in Romania
- Coordinates: 47°31′12″N 22°7′48″E
- Country: Romania
- County: Bihor

Government
  - Mayor (2024–2028): József-Attila Karsai (UDMR)
- Area: 73.54 km^{2} (28.39 sq mi)
- Elevation: 127 m (417 ft)
- Population (2021-12-01): 8,969
  - Density: 122.0/km^{2} (315.9/sq mi)
- Time zone: UTC+02:00 (EET)
  - Summer (DST): UTC+03:00 (EEST)
- Postal code: 415700
- Area code: (+40) 02 59
- Vehicle reg.: BH
- Website: www.valealuimihai.ro

Valea lui Mihai (Romanian pronunciation: [ˈvale̯a luj miˈhaj]; Hungarian: Érmihályfalva) is a town in Bihor County, Crișana, Romania.

== Geography ==
The town is located at the northern tip of Bihor County, around 66 km (41 mi) north-east of the county seat, Oradea, on the border with Hungary. It is crossed by national road DN19 (on this segment, part of European route E671), which runs from Oradea all the way to Sighetu Marmației, on the border with Ukraine. From Valea lui Mihai, road DN19C branches off, leading to the Hungarian border, 9.5 km (5.9 mi) away, where it connects to Main road 48.

== History ==
In 1312, under Charles I, it was allowed new trade privileges and then in 1459 was also allowed tax benefits privileges for its citizens. Later it was part of the Ottoman Empire, which resulted in its depopulation, but the inhabitants subsequently returned. From the late 17th century (formally the 1699 Treaty of Karlowitz), it was part of Hungary within the Habsburg monarchy (the Austrian Empire from 1804) and from the Austro-Hungarian Compromise of 1867 the Kingdom of Hungary (Lands of the Crown of Saint Stephen) within Austria-Hungary.

After the collapse of Austria-Hungary at the end of World War I, and the declaration of the Union of Transylvania with Romania, the Romanian Army took control of the town in the spring of 1919, during the Hungarian–Romanian War. Valea lui Mihai officially became part of the territory ceded to the Kingdom of Romania in June 1920 under the terms of the Treaty of Trianon. After the administrative unification law in 1925, the town became the seat of plasa Valea lui Mihai in Sălaj County. In August 1940, under the auspices of Nazi Germany, which imposed the Second Vienna Award, Hungary retook the territory of Northern Transylvania (which included Valea lui Mihai) from Romania. Towards the end of World War II, however, the town was taken back from Hungarian and German troops by Romanian and Soviet forces in October 1944, during the initial stages of the Battle of Debrecen; it became again part of Romania in March 1945. Following the administrative reform of 1950, Valea lui Mihai became part of Săcueni Raion within Bihor Region (renamed Oradea Region in 1952 and Crișana Region in 1960). In 1968, the old territorial division into județe was reinstituted, and Valea lui Mihai became part of Bihor County. It was declared a town on three separate occasions: in 1844, 1930, and 1989, the last time as a result of the Romanian rural systematization program.

=== Jewish history ===
Jews from Galicia settled around 1780, engaging in agriculture and commerce. A junior high school was opened in 1873. Anschel Bak opened a printing press in the late 19th century. Fifty Hungarian Hasidic rabbis held a convention in the town in 1898.

In 1930, there were 1,535 Jews, or 19% of the total population. During the interwar period, Jews were the leaders of local industry, employing hundreds of workers. Some Zionist youth groups were founded in the 1930s. In 1935, the town was the site of the HaNoar HaTzioni national convention.

The Jewish population was sent by the Hungarian authorities to the Oradea ghetto in May 1944 and subsequently deported to Auschwitz. Some of the survivors returned briefly to the town after the war.

== Population ==
Historical population
| Year | Pop. | ±% |
|---|---|---|
| 1880 | 3,896 | — |
| 1890 | 4,856 | +24.6% |
| 1900 | 5,575 | +14.8% |
| 1910 | 6,255 | +12.2% |
| 1920 | 7,175 | +14.7% |
| 1930 | 8,085 | +12.7% |
| 1941 | 9,136 | +13.0% |
| 1956 | 9,480 | +3.8% |
| 1966 | 9,814 | +3.5% |
| 1977 | 11,099 | +13.1% |
| 1992 | 10,505 | −5.4% |
| 2002 | 10,665 | +1.5% |
| 2011 | 9,688 | −9.2% |
| 2021 | 8,969 | −7.4% |
Source: Census data

At the census from 2011, there were 9,668 people living within the town; of those, 81.03% were ethnic Hungarians, while 13.23% were ethnic Romanians, and 1.3% others. According to the 2021 census, Valea lui Mihai has a population of 8,969, of which 79.14% were Hungarians, 11.55% Romanians, and 4.72% Roma.

== Image gallery ==
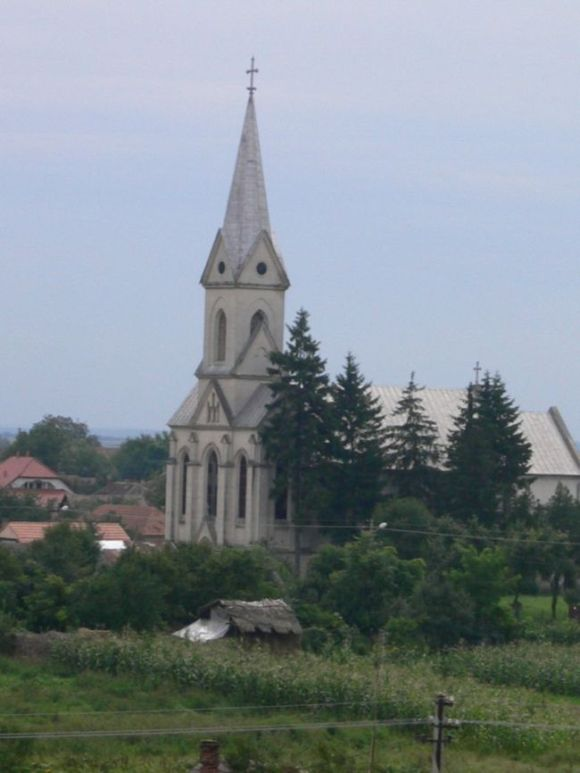
The Roman Catholic church of the town

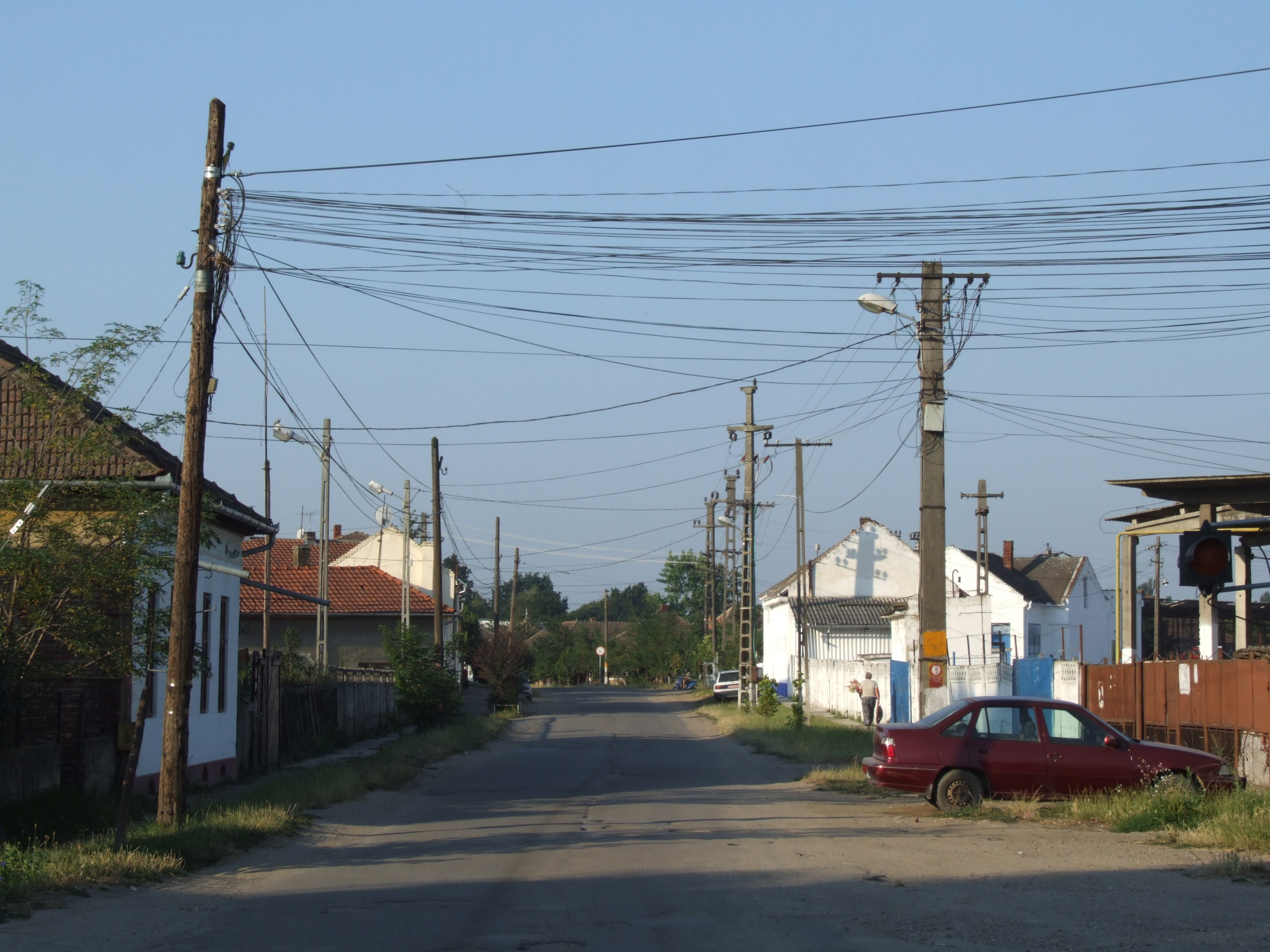
Street in Valea lui Mihai

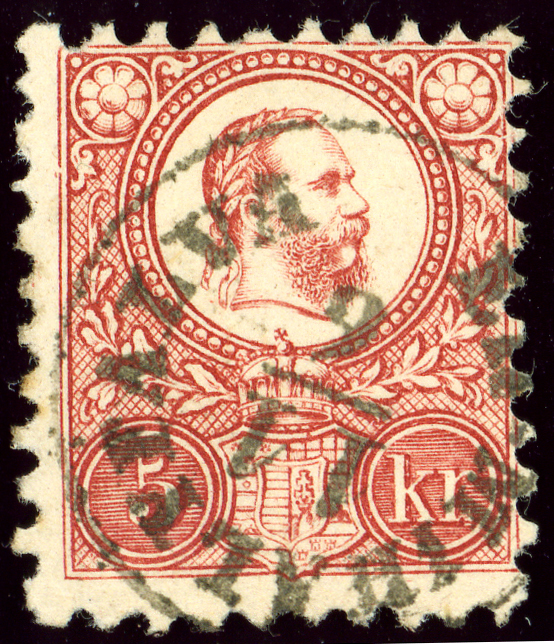
Er-Mihalyfalva on Hungary stamp issued in 1871
