= Vámospércs =

- Town
- Flag Coat of arms

- Location within Hungary
- Coordinates: 47°32′N 21°54′E
- Country: Hungary
- County: Hajdú-Bihar
- District: Nyíradony

Area
  - Total: 58.2 km^{2} (22.5 sq mi)

Population (2015)
  - Total: 5,362
  - Density: 92.2/km^{2} (239/sq mi)
- Time zone: UTC+1 (CET)
  - Summer (DST): UTC+2 (CEST)
- Postal code: 4287
- Area code: (+36) 52
- Website: www.vamospercs.hu

Vámospércs is a town in Hajdú-Bihar county, in the Northern Great Plain region of eastern Hungary.

== Geography ==
It covers an area of 58.2 km^{2} (22 sq mi) and has a population of 5362 people (2015).

== International relations ==
=== Twin towns – Sister cities ===
Vámospércs is twinned with:

- Valea lui Mihai, Romania
- Koronowo, Poland
- Nușfalău, Romania
