= Main road 481 (Hungary) =

Road in Hungary

Main road 481
- 481-es főút

Route information
- Length: 5.5 km (3.4 mi)
- History: 2017

Major junctions
- From: M35 near Mikepércs
- To: 47 near Déli Ipari Park

Location
- Country: Hungary
- Counties: Hajdú-Bihar
- Major cities: Debrecen

Highway system
- Roads in Hungary; Highways; Main roads; Local roads

The Main road 481 is a short bypass direction Secondary class main road near Debrecen, that connects the M35 motorway's Mikepércs junction to the Main road 47. The road is 5.5 kilometres (3.4 mi) long.

The road, as well as all other main roads in Hungary, is managed and maintained by Magyar Közút, state owned company.

== See also ==
- Roads in Hungary
