= Nyíradony District =

Nyíradony District Nyíradonyi járás
- Districts of Hungary
- Coat of arms

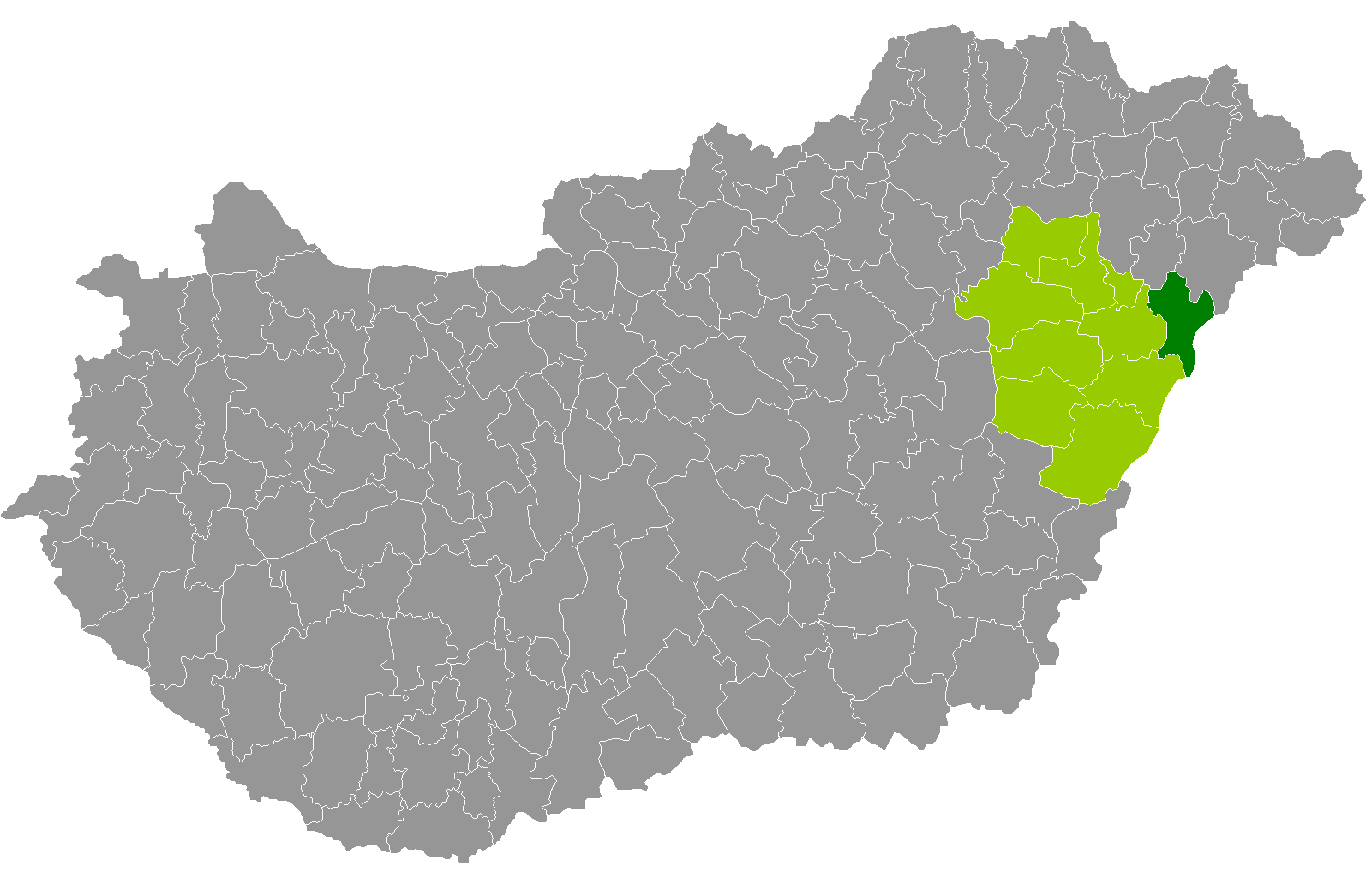
- Nyíradony District within Hungary and Hajdú-Bihar County.
- Coordinates: 47.69°N 21.90°E
- Country: Hungary
- County: Hajdú-Bihar
- District seat: Nyíradony

Area
  - Total: 510.28 km^{2} (197.02 sq mi)
  - Rank: 8th in Hajdú-Bihar

Population (2011 census)
  - Total: 29,534
  - Rank: 9th in Hajdú-Bihar
  - Density: 58/km^{2} (150/sq mi)

Nyíradony (Hungarian: Nyíradonyi járás) is a district in north-eastern part of Hajdú-Bihar County. Nyíradony is also the name of the town where the district seat is found. The district is located in the Northern Great Plain Statistical Region. This district is a part of Nyírség geographical region.

== Geography ==
Nyíradony District borders with Nagykálló District and Nyírbátor District (Szabolcs-Szatmár-Bereg County) to the north, the Romanian county of Bihor to the east, Derecske District to the south, Debrecen District to the west. The number of the inhabited places in Nyíradony District is 9.

== Municipalities ==
The district has 2 towns, 2 large villages and 5 villages. (ordered by population, as of 1 January 2012)

- Álmosd (1,555)
- Bagamér (2,478)
- Fülöp (1,738)
- Nyíracsád (3,763)
- **Nyíradony** (7,798) – district seat
- Nyírábrány (3,657)
- Nyírmártonfalva (2,013)
- Újléta (1,038)
- **Vámospércs** (5,263)

The bolded municipalities are cities, italics municipalities are large villages.

== Demographics ==
Religion in Nyíradony District (2011 census)
1. Greek Catholicism (28.7%)
2. Catholic Church (14.2%)
3. Calvinism (28.0%)
4. Other religions (1.50%)
5. Non-religious (9.40%)
6. Atheists (0.30%)
7. Undeclared (17.9%)

In 2011, it had a population of 29,534 and the population density was 58/km^{2}.

Year	County population	Change
2011	29,534	n/a

=== Ethnicity ===
Besides the Hungarian majority, the main minority is the Roma (approx. 2,500).

Total population (2011 census): 29,534
Ethnic groups (2011 census): Identified themselves: 28,679 persons:

- Hungarians: 26,140 (91.15%)
- Gypsies: 2,263 (7.89%)
- Others and indefinable: 276 (0.96%)

Approx. 1,000 persons in Nyíradony District did not declare their ethnic group at the 2011 census.

=== Religion ===
Religious adherence in the county according to 2011 census:

- Catholic – 12,677 (Greek Catholic – 8,485; Roman Catholic – 4,191);
- Reformed – 8,242;
- other religions – 446;
- Non-religious – 2,777;
- Atheism – 84;
- Undeclared – 5,308.

== Gallery ==
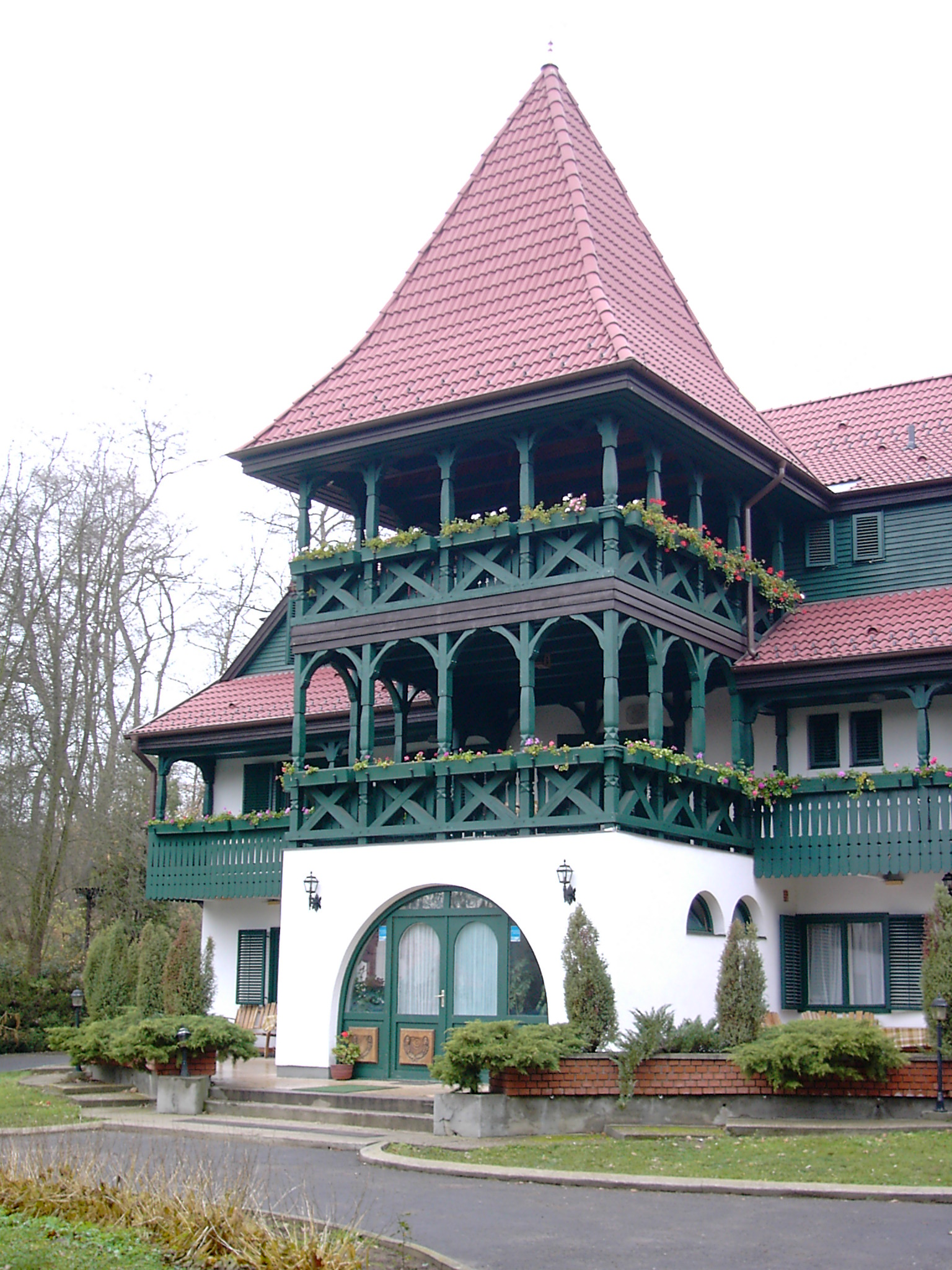
Nyíradony, the district seat

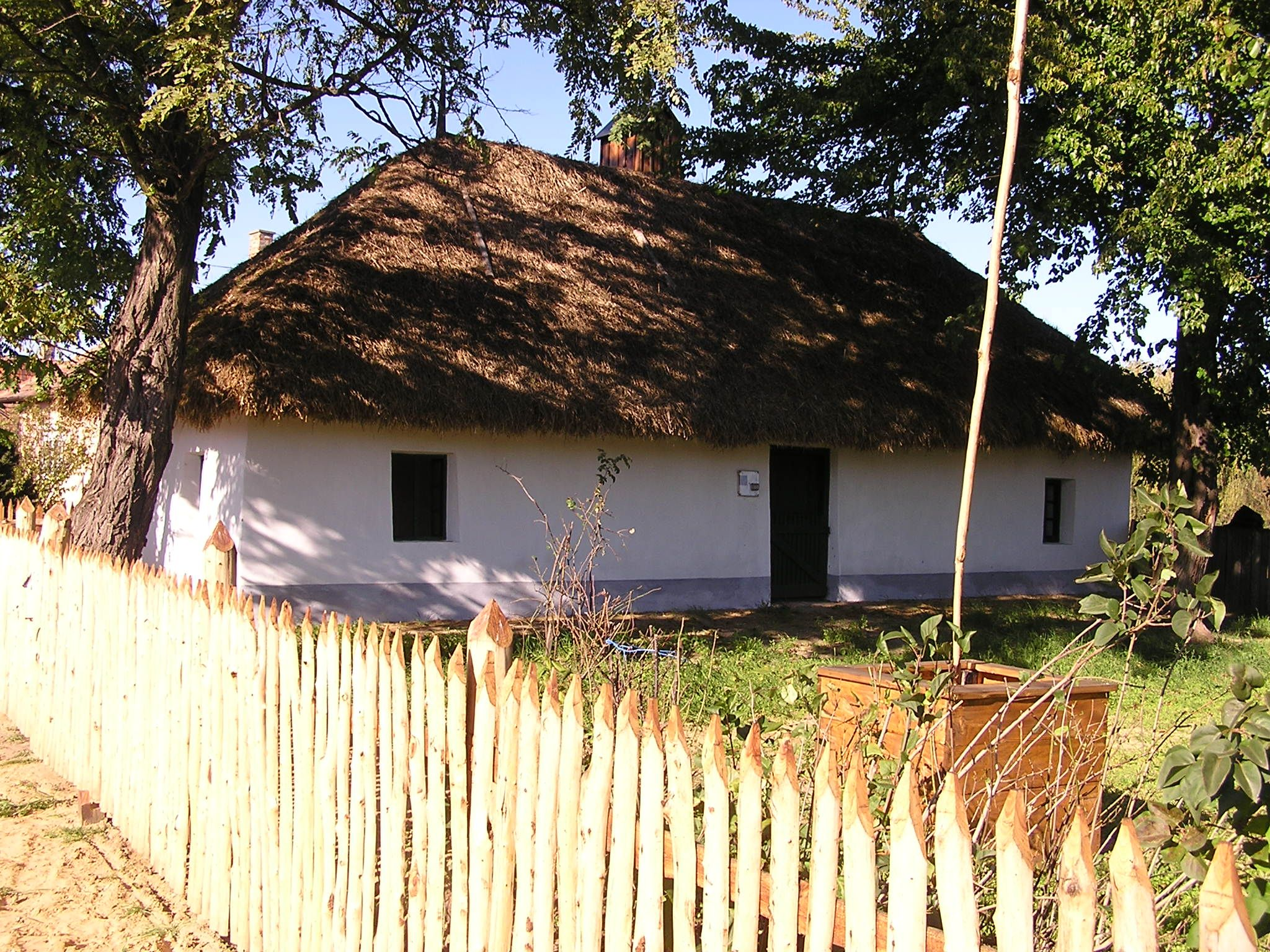
Traditional house from Nyírábrány

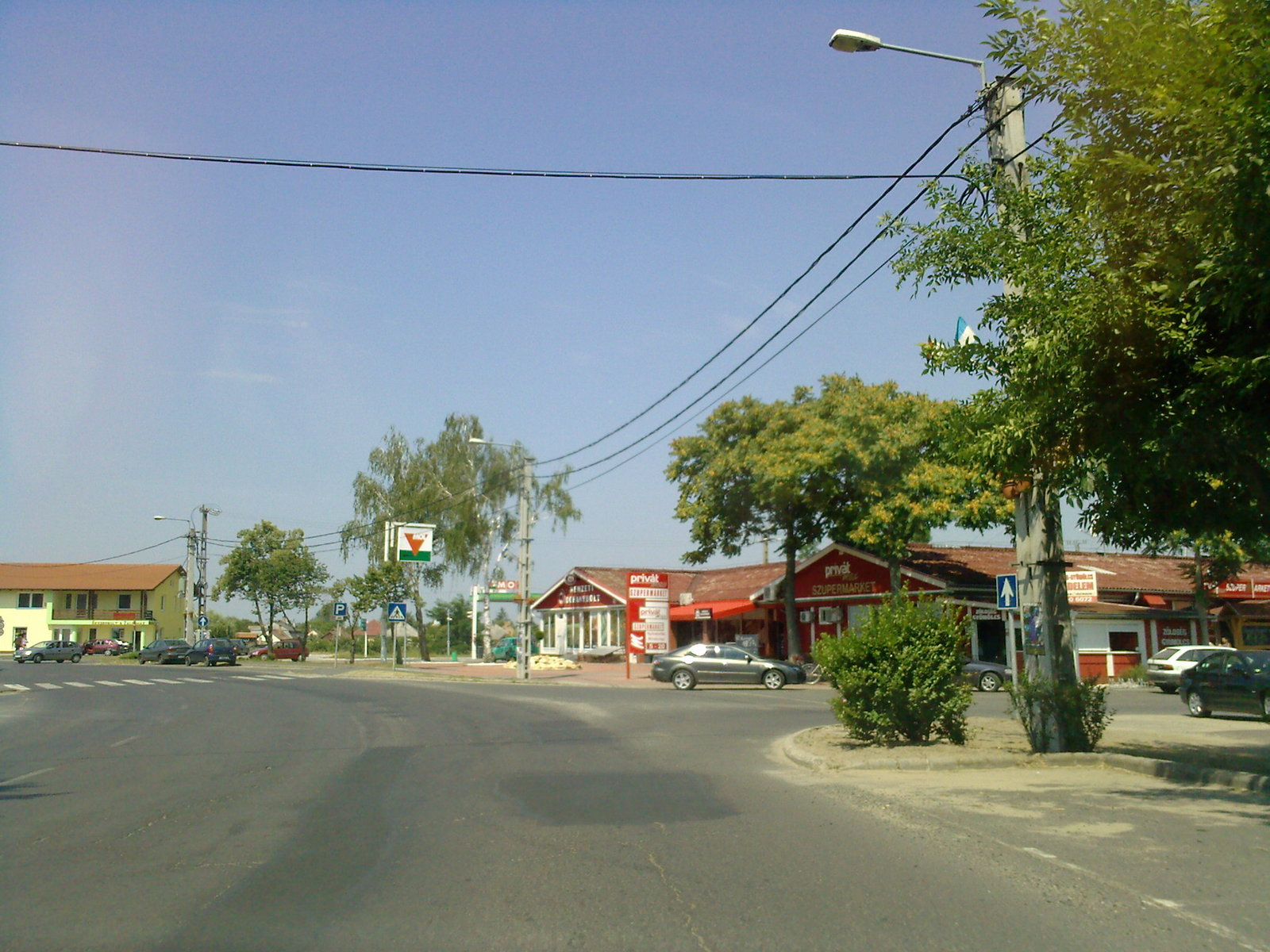
View of Vámospércs

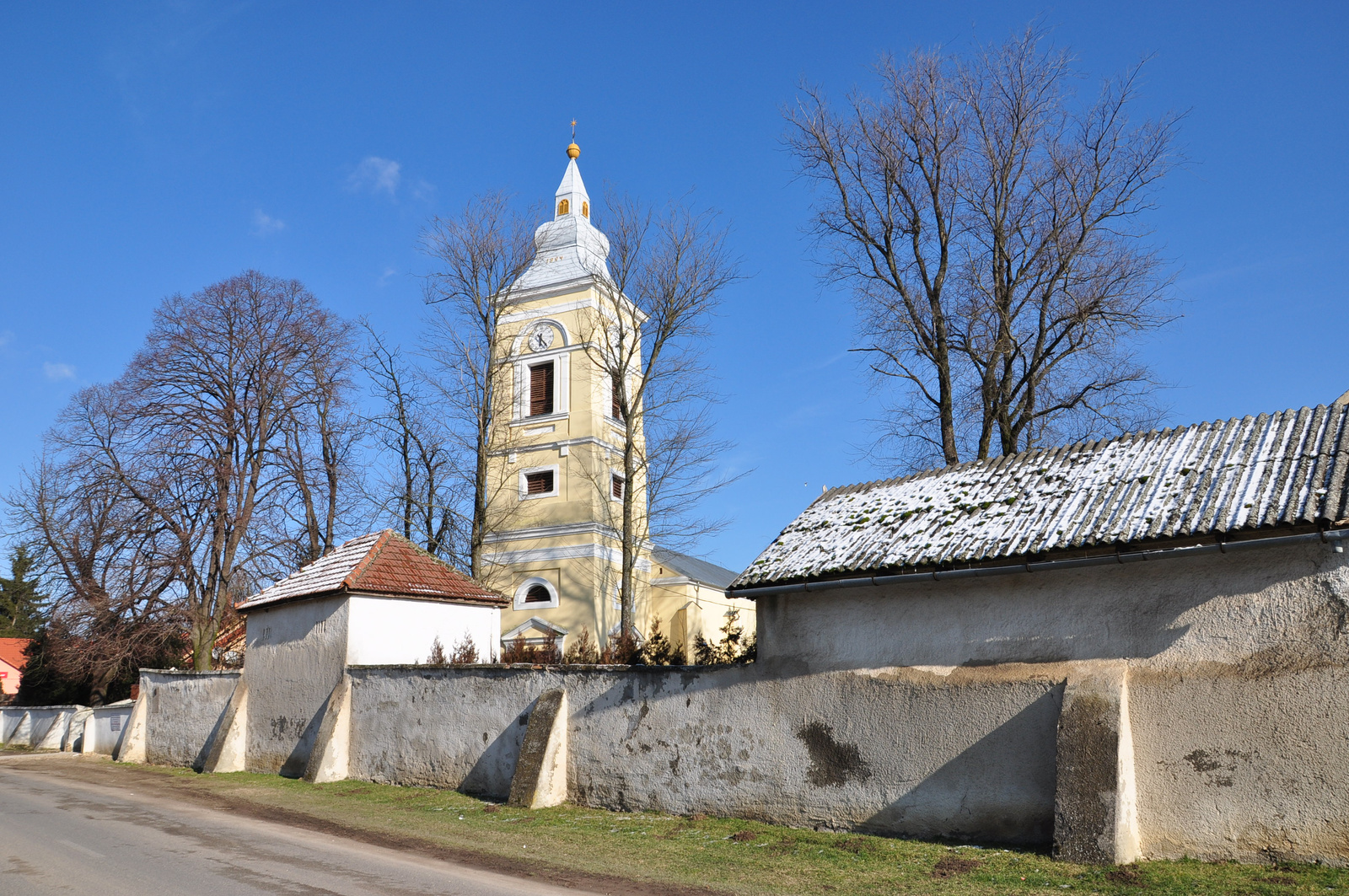
Reformed Church in Álmosd

== See also ==
- List of cities and towns of Hungary
