= Main road 48 (Hungary) =

Road in Hungary

Main road 48
- 48-as főút

Route information
- Length: 30 km (19 mi)

Major junctions
- From: 4 in Debrecen
- To: Nyírábrány; DN19C border with Romania

Location
- Country: Hungary
- Counties: Hajdú-Bihar
- Major cities: Debrecen, Nyírábrány

Highway system
- Roads in Hungary; Highways; Main roads; Local roads

The Main road 48 is a west–east direction Secondary class main road, that connects the Main road 4 change to the border of Romania. The road is 30 kilometres (19 mi) long.

The road, as well as all other main roads in Hungary, is managed and maintained by Magyar Közút, state owned company.

== See also ==
- Roads in Hungary
