= László Tasó =

Hungarian politician (born 1963)

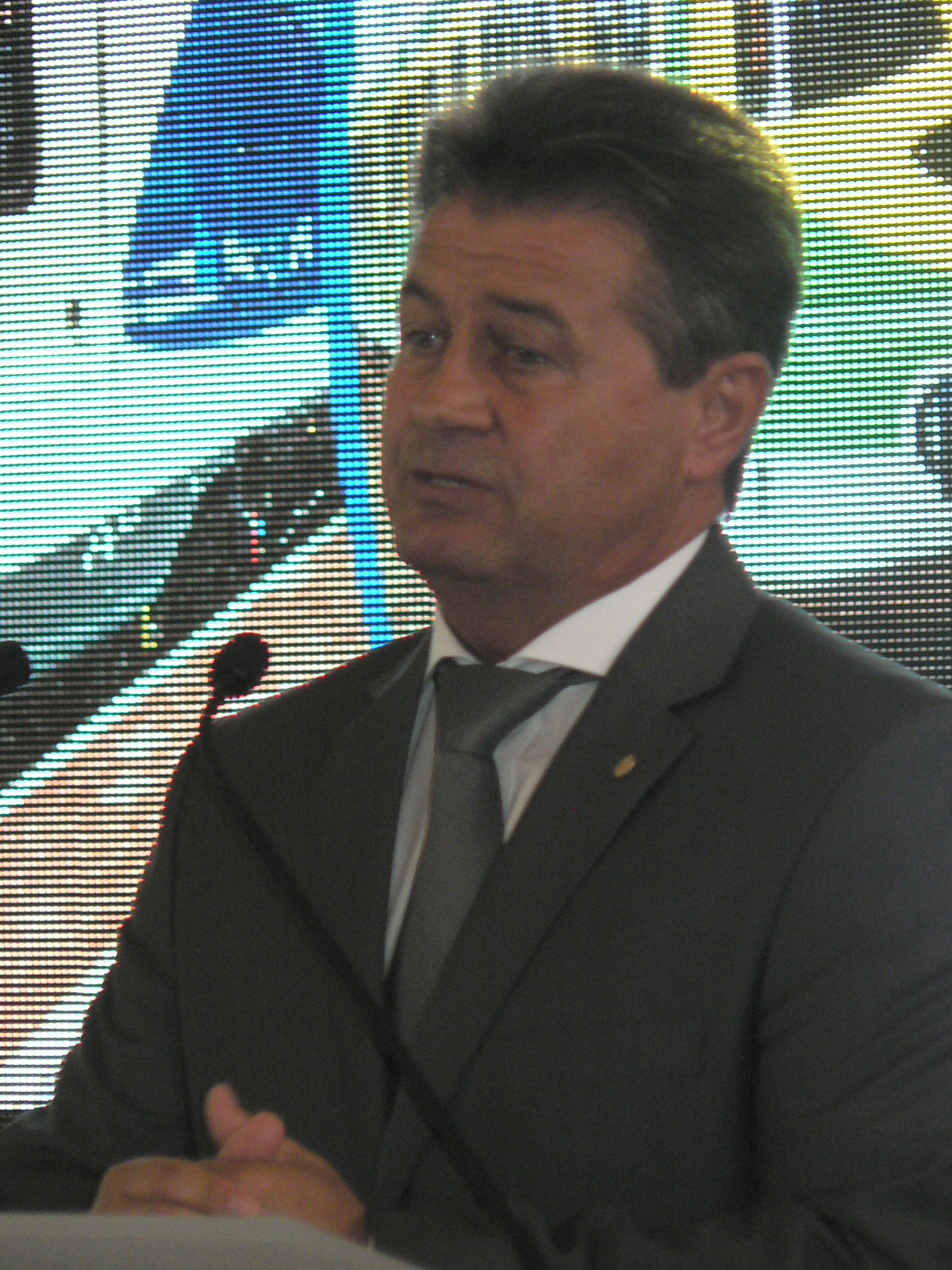

Member of the National Assembly
- In office 27 August 2004 – 8 May 2026

Personal details
- Born: 14 January 1963 (age 63) Debrecen, Hungary
- Party: Fidesz
- Spouse: Mária Megyesi
- Children: Marianna; Adrienn
- Profession: politician

László Tasó (born 14 January 1963) is a Hungarian politician, member of the National Assembly (MP) for Hajdúhadház (Hajdú-Bihar County Constituency IV) from 2006 to 2014, and for Debrecen (Hajdú-Bihar County Constituency III) from 2014 to 2026. He was also MP from the county regional list of Fidesz between 2004 and 2006. He served as mayor of Nyíradony between 1994 and 2014. He was appointed Secretary of State for Transport on 1 July 2014.

== Early life ==
Tasó finished his secondary studies at Bethlen Gábor Secondary School of Economics and Postal Services, and Kiss Ferenc Secondary School of Forestry and Game Management in Debrecen. He graduated as a part-time student at the Department of Sociology of the Faculty of Arts of Kossuth Lajos University, majoring in social work. He acquired his university degree from University of Debrecen, in social policy. He also accomplished a university degree of European studies from the University of Debrecen.

He started work in 1981 at the Gúth Forestry Plant of FEFAG, a forestry and timber industry state farm. He was a foreman from 1982, then he held the positions of process manager, economic analyst and plant manager, finally sales manager. In 1991 he started his own business Quercus Bt., a partnership, where he is managing partner. Prior to his election to mayor he was owner and member of the limited liability company Quattro-Trans from 1993.

== Political career ==
On 11 December 1994 he was an independent candidate in the local elections for the mayoral position of Nyíradony, and was elected ahead of five candidates. He was elected incumbent mayor as an independent candidate in 1998, supported by Fidesz and the Christian Democratic People's Party (KDNP). On 20 October 2002 he was elected mayor for the third term, this time as a Fidesz candidate. Supported by Fidesz, the Hungarian Democratic Forum (MDF), and the Association of Farmers' Circles, he also secured a seat in the General Assembly of Hajdú-Bihar County, where he headed the Committee on Tourism.

He was 15th on the joint county list of Fidesz and MDF in the 2002 parliamentary election. He was co-opted in the wake of the resolution of the County Board of Fidesz in August 2004 following the resignation of István Pálfi, elected from the Hajdú-Bihar County Regional List, who had been elected a member of the European Parliament (MEP). Tasó took his oath on 27 August 2004. He became a member of the Committee on Social and Family Affairs. In the parliamentary elections held in 2006 and 2010, he was elected MP for Hajdúhadház. He was appointed a member of the Local Government and Urban Development Committee on 30 May 2006.

Tasó was re-elected MP for Debrecen in the 2014 and 2018 parliamentary elections. He was a member of the Committee on Budgets for a short time between May and July 2014. He served as Secretary of State for Transport within the Ministry of National Development from 1 July 2014 to 7 February 2017. Following that, he functioned as State Secretary for the Development of Settlements with less than 10,000 inhabitants within the Prime Minister's Office between 8 February 2017 and 17 May 2018. After the 2018 national election, he became a member of the Enterprise Development Committee. He held the membership until 2026, and was a vice-chairman of the committee from 2022.

He was replaced as individual candidate for Debrecen by the Fidesz presidium for the 2026 Hungarian parliamentary election. Although his name appeared in his party's national list, he did not secure a mandate.
