= Nyíradony =

- Town
- Flag Coat of arms

- Location within Hungary
- Coordinates: 47°41′N 21°55′E
- Country: Hungary
- County: Hajdú-Bihar
- District: Nyíradony

Area
  - Total: 96.59 km^{2} (37.29 sq mi)

Population (2001)
  - Total: 8,070
  - Density: 83.2/km^{2} (215/sq mi)
- Time zone: UTC+1 (CET)
  - Summer (DST): UTC+2 (CEST)
- Postal code: 4254
- Area code: (+36) 52
- Website: www.nyiradony.hu

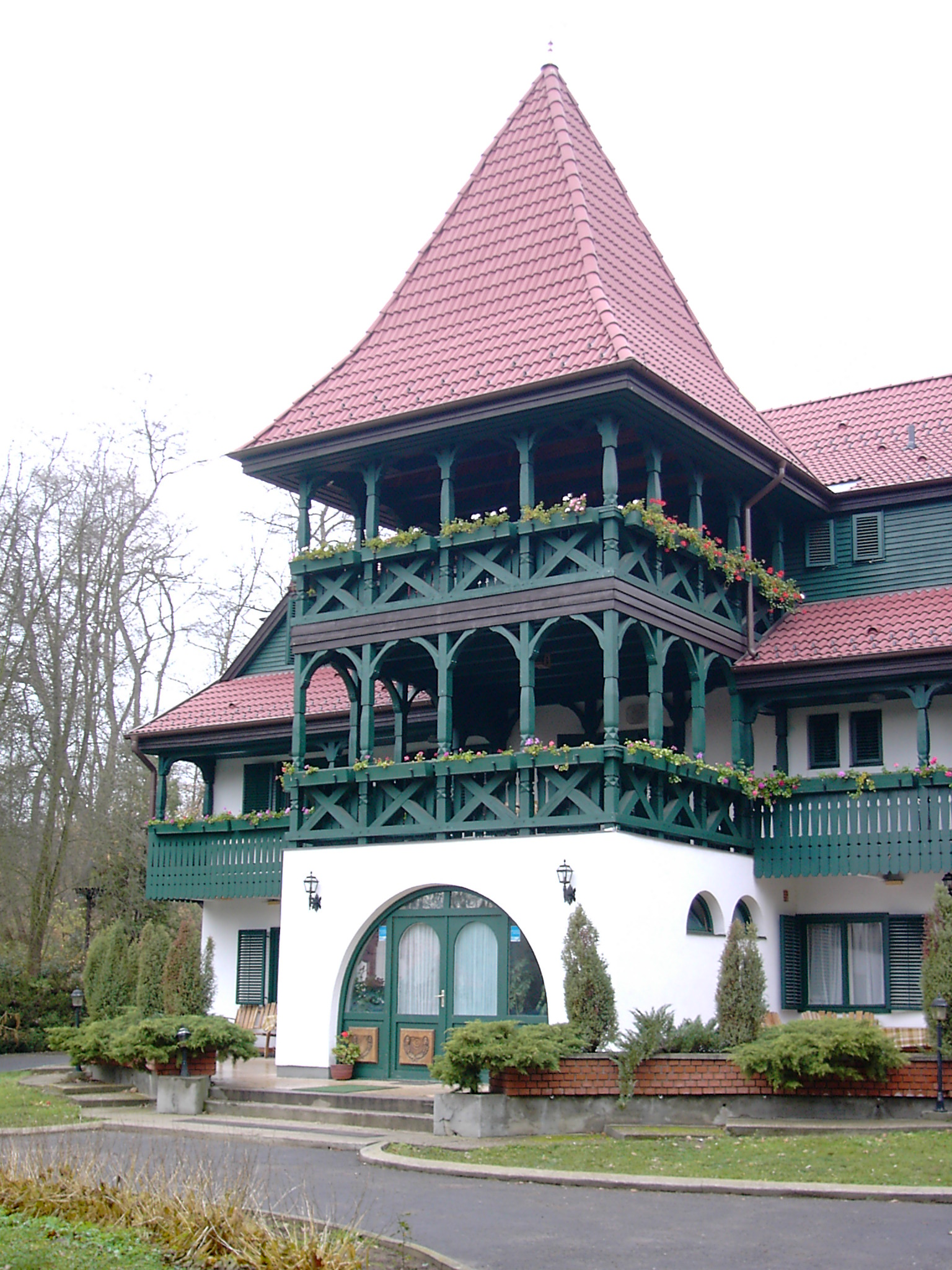
Hunting lodge nearby Nyíradony

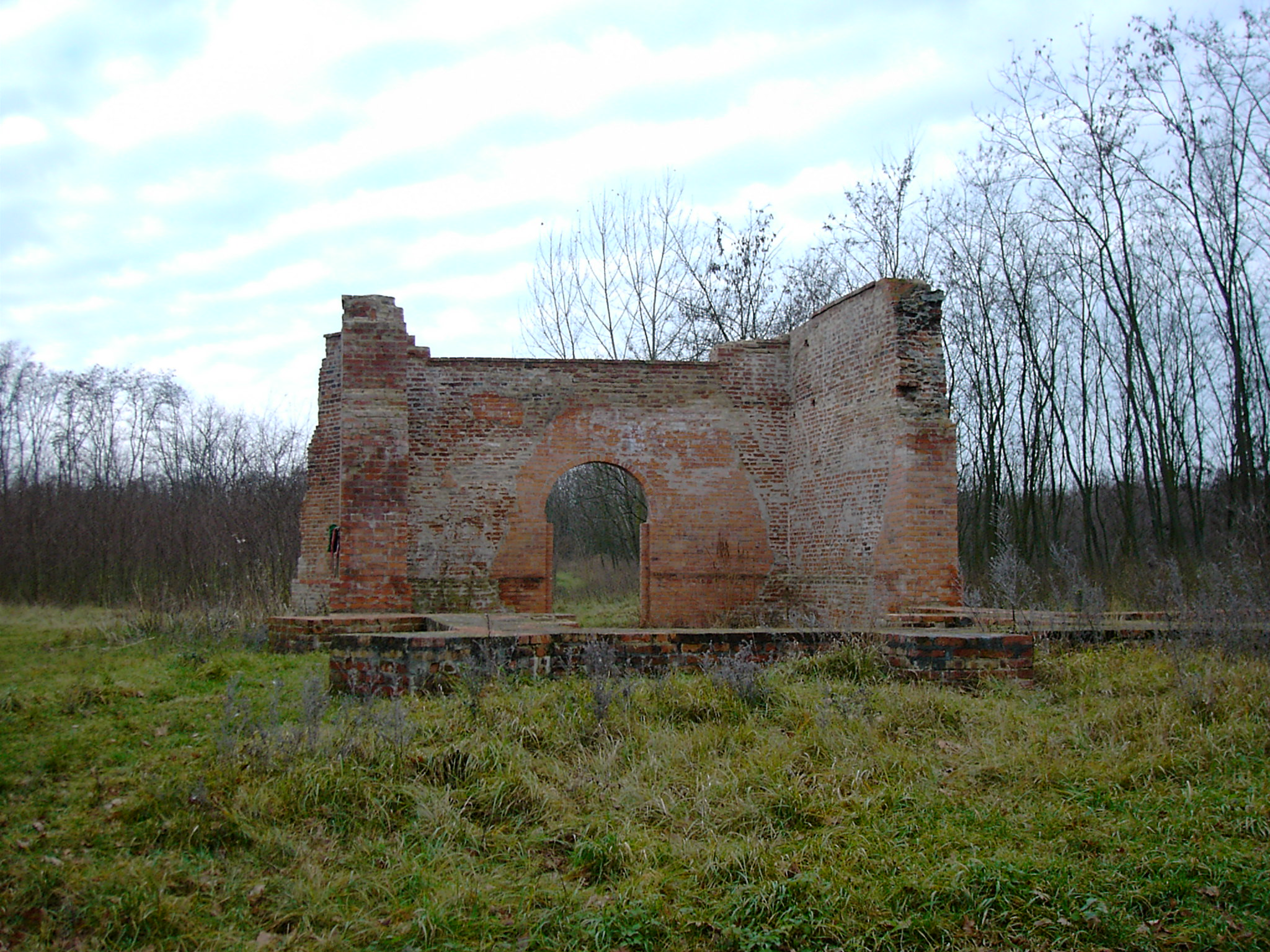
Ruin of little chapel

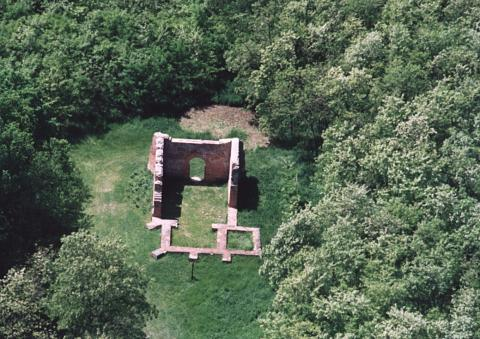
Aerial photography of ruins

Nyíradony (Romanian: Nir-Adon) is a town in Hajdú-Bihar county, in the Northern Great Plain region of eastern Hungary.

== Geography ==
It covers an area of 96.59 km^{2} (37 sq mi) and in 2001, had a population of 8,070.

== Places of interest ==
- New sports hall with indoor pool and sauna
- Greek Catholic church in the city centre with nice wall paintings
- Ruin of a little chapel that was destroyed by the Tatars in the 12th century

== Transportation ==
- By car: Highway 471 connects Nyíradony with Debrecen.
- By train: There are sporadic direct connections to Budapest. In general it is necessary to change trains in Debrecen for long distance connections.

== Accommodation ==
- In the forest (about 3 kilometers east of Nyíradony) there is a hunting lodge with a guesthouse.
