= Bagamér =

- Large village
- Coat of arms

- Location within Hungary
- Coordinates: 47°27′N 22°00′E
- Country: Hungary
- County: Hajdú-Bihar
- District: Nyíradony

Area
  - Total: 47.02 km^{2} (18.15 sq mi)

Population (2015)
  - Total: 2,540
  - Density: 54/km^{2} (140/sq mi)
- Time zone: UTC+1 (CET)
  - Summer (DST): UTC+2 (CEST)
- Postal code: 4286
- Area code: (+36) 52

Bagamér is a village in Hajdú-Bihar county, in the Nyíradony District of Hungary.

== Geography ==
It covers an area of 47.02 km^{2} (18 sq mi) and has a population of 2540 people (2015).
