= Ártánd =

- Village
- Coat of arms

- Location within Hungary
- Coordinates: 47°7′23″N 21°45′32″E
- Country: Hungary
- County: Hajdú-Bihar

Area
  - Total: 19.82 km^{2} (7.65 sq mi)

Population (2015)
  - Total: 514
  - Density: 25.9/km^{2} (67.2/sq mi)
- Time zone: UTC+1 (CET)
  - Summer (DST): UTC+2 (CEST)
- Postal code: 4115
- Area code: 54

Ártánd is a village in Hajdú-Bihar county, in the Northern Great Plain region of eastern Hungary.

== Geography ==
It covers an area of 19.81 km^{2} (8 sq mi) and has a population of 505 people (2025).

== Population ==
In 2001, 99% of the population of the settlement declared themselves to be Hungarian, 1% to be Gypsy nationalities.
