= Fegyvernek =

- Town
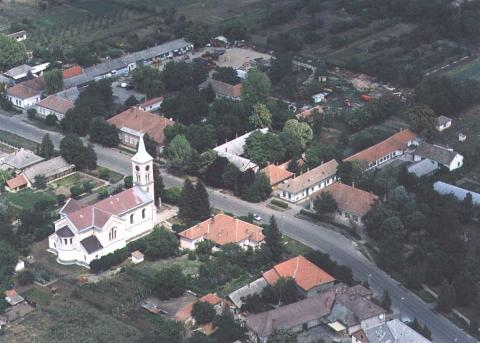
- Aerial view

- Flag Coat of arms

- Location within Hungary
- Coordinates: 47°16′N 20°32′E
- Country: Hungary
- County: Jász-Nagykun-Szolnok
- District: Törökszentmiklós

Area
  - Total: 71.48 km^{2} (27.60 sq mi)

Population (2015)
  - Total: 6,447
  - Density: 90.2/km^{2} (234/sq mi)
- Time zone: UTC+1 (CET)
  - Summer (DST): UTC+2 (CEST)
- Postal code: 5231
- Area code: (+36) 56
- Website: www.fegyvernek.hu

Fegyvernek is a town in Jász-Nagykun-Szolnok County, in the Northern Great Plain region of central Hungary.

== Geography ==
It covers an area of 71.48 km^{2} (28 sq mi).

== Population ==
It has a population of 6447 people (2015).
