= Nyírábrány =

- Large village
- Coat of arms

- Location within Hungary
- Coordinates: 47°33′N 22°02′E
- Country: Hungary
- County: Hajdú-Bihar
- District: Nyíradony

Area
  - Total: 55.62 km^{2} (21.48 sq mi)

Population (2015)
  - Total: 3,777
  - Density: 67.9/km^{2} (176/sq mi)
- Time zone: UTC+1 (CET)
  - Summer (DST): UTC+2 (CEST)
- Postal code: 4264
- Area code: (+36) 52

Nyírábrány is a large village in Hajdú-Bihar county, in the Northern Great Plain region of eastern Hungary.

== Geography ==
It covers an area of 55.62 km^{2} (21 sq mi) and has a population of 3777 people (2015).

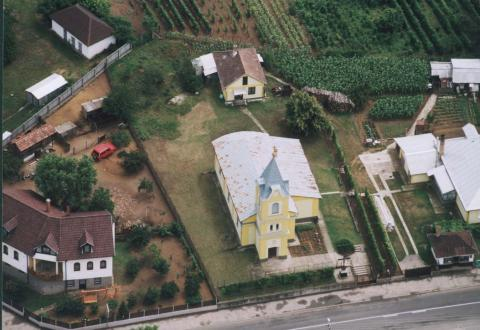
Aerial photography of Nyírábrány

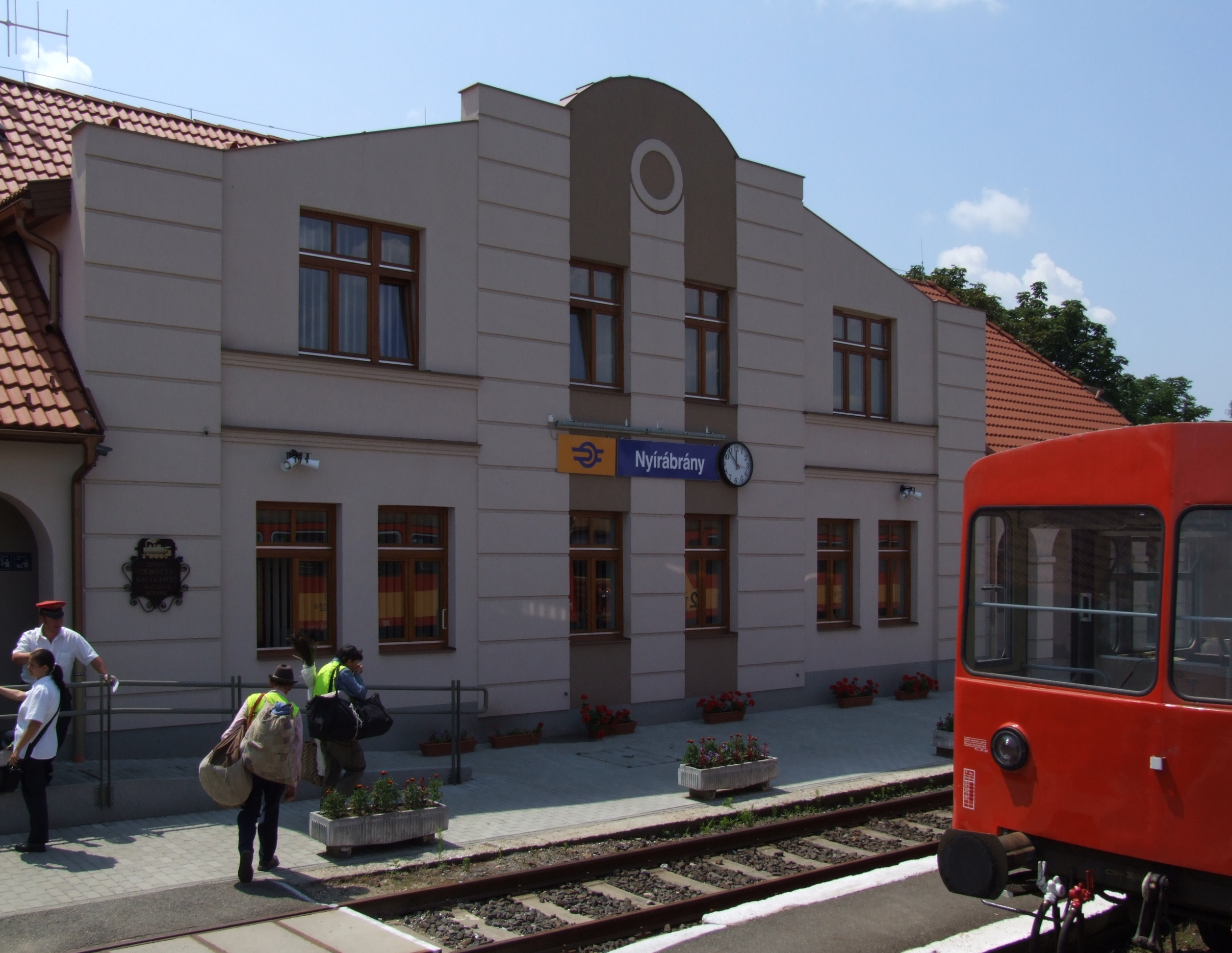
Train station
