= Hajdú-Bihar County 5th constituency =

Constituency in Hungary (2012-)

Hajdú-Bihar County 5th constituency (Hajdúszoboszló)
- Constituency for the National Assembly
- Location of Hajdú-Bihar county 05 within Hajdú-Bihar county

- Location of Hajdú-Bihar county within Hungary
- County: Hajdú-Bihar
- Electorate: 69,791 (2018)
- Major settlements: Hajdúszoboszló

Current constituency
- Created: 2011
- Party: Tisza Party
- Member: Romulusz Ruszin-Szendi
- Elected: 2026

The 5th constituency of Hajdú-Bihar County (Hungarian: Hajdú-Bihar megyei 05. számú országgyűlési egyéni választókerület) is one of the single member constituencies of the National Assembly, the national legislature of Hungary. The constituency standard abbreviation: Hajdú-Bihar 05. OEVK.

Since 2026, it has been represented by Romulusz Ruszin-Szendi of the Tisza Party.

== Geography ==
The 5th constituency is located in western part of Hajdú-Bihar County.

=== List of municipalities ===
The constituency includes the following municipalities:

1. Báránd
2. Ebes
3. Egyek
4. Földes
5. Hajdúszoboszló
6. Hajdúszovát
7. Hortobágy
8. Kaba
9. Nádudvar
10. Nagyhegyes
11. Püspökladány
12. Sárrétudvari
13. Szerep
14. Tetétlen
15. Tiszacsege

== Members ==
The constituency was first represented by Sándor Bodó of the Fidesz from 2014, and he was re-elected in 2018 and 2022. In the 2026 election, Romulusz Ruszin-Szendi of the Tisza Party was elected representative.

Election	Member	Party	%	Ref.
2014	Sándor Bodó	Fidesz	44.46	
2018	Sándor Bodó	Fidesz	51.58	
2022	Sándor Bodó	Fidesz	60.61	
2026	Romulusz Ruszin-Szendi	TISZA	50.00	
