= Püspökladány District =

Coordinates: 47.3167°N 21.2167°E

Püspökladány District Püspökladányi járás
- Districts of Hungary
- Coat of arms

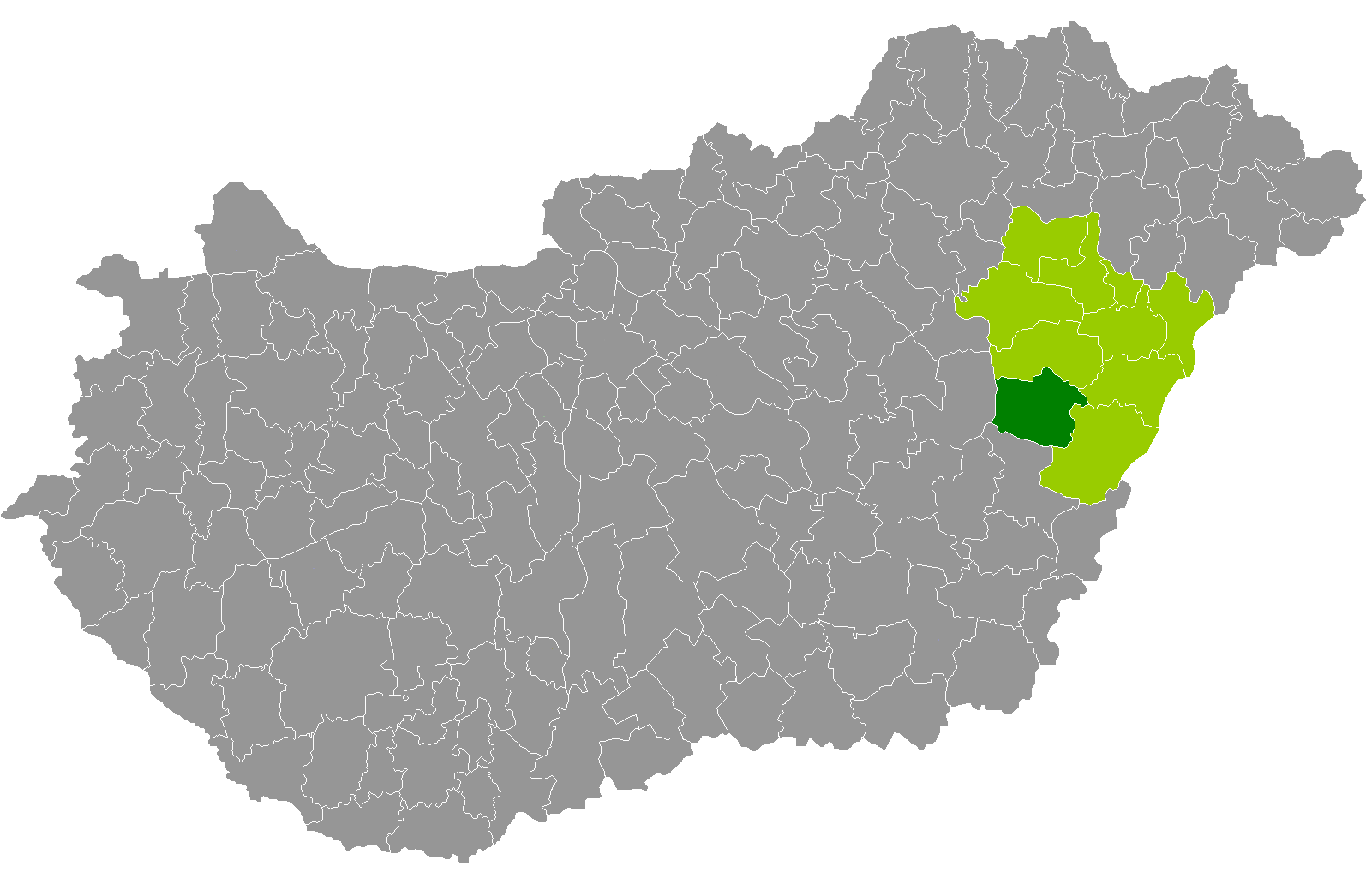
- Püspökladány District within Hungary and Hajdú-Bihar County.
- Country: Hungary
- County: Hajdú-Bihar
- District seat: Püspökladány

Area
  - Total: 729.04 km^{2} (281.48 sq mi)
  - Rank: 4th in Hajdú-Bihar

Population (2011 census)
  - Total: 40,426
  - Rank: 6th in Hajdú-Bihar
  - Density: 55/km^{2} (140/sq mi)

Püspökladány (Hungarian: Püspökladányi járás) is a district in south-western part of Hajdú-Bihar County. Püspökladány is also the name of the town where the district seat is found. The district is located in the Northern Great Plain Statistical Region. This district is a part of Hajdúság historical and geographical region.

== Geography ==
Püspökladány District borders with Hajdúszoboszló District to the north, Derecske District and Berettyóújfalu District to the east, Szeghalom District (Békés County) to the south, Karcag District (Jász-Nagykun-Szolnok County) to the west. The number of the inhabited places in Püspökladány District is 12.

== Municipalities ==
The district has 2 towns, 3 large villages and 7 villages. (ordered by population, as of 1 January 2012)

- Báránd (2,530)
- Bihardancsháza (180)
- Biharnagybajom (2,731)
- Bihartorda (897)
- Földes (3,998)
- **Kaba** (5,932)
- Nagyrábé (1,974)
- **Püspökladány** (14,698) – district seat
- Sáp (938)
- Sárrétudvari (2,751)
- Szerep (1,506)
- Tetétlen (1,394)

The bolded municipalities are cities, italics municipalities are large villages.

== Demographics ==
Religion in Püspökladány District (2011 census)
1. Calvinism (40.9%)
2. Catholic Church (6.60%)
3. Greek Catholicism (0.30%)
4. Other religions (0.90%)
5. Non-religious (28.4%)
6. Atheists (0.60%)
7. Undeclared (22.3%)

In 2011, it had a population of 40,426 and the population density was 55/km².

Year	County population	Change
2011	40,426	n/a

=== Ethnicity ===
Besides the Hungarian majority, the main minority is the Roma (approx. 2,500).

Total population (2011 census): 40,426
Ethnic groups (2011 census): Identified themselves: 37,778 persons:

- Hungarians: 35,227 (93.25%)
- Gypsies: 2,253 (5.96%)
- Others and indefinable: 298 (0.79%)

Approx. 3,000 persons in Püspökladány District did not declare their ethnic group at the 2011 census.

=== Religion ===
Religious adherence in the county according to 2011 census:

- Reformed – 16,521;
- Catholic – 2,833 (Roman Catholic – 2,689; Greek Catholic – 142);
- other religions – 345;
- Non-religious – 11,462;
- Atheism – 227;
- Undeclared – 9,038.

== Gallery ==
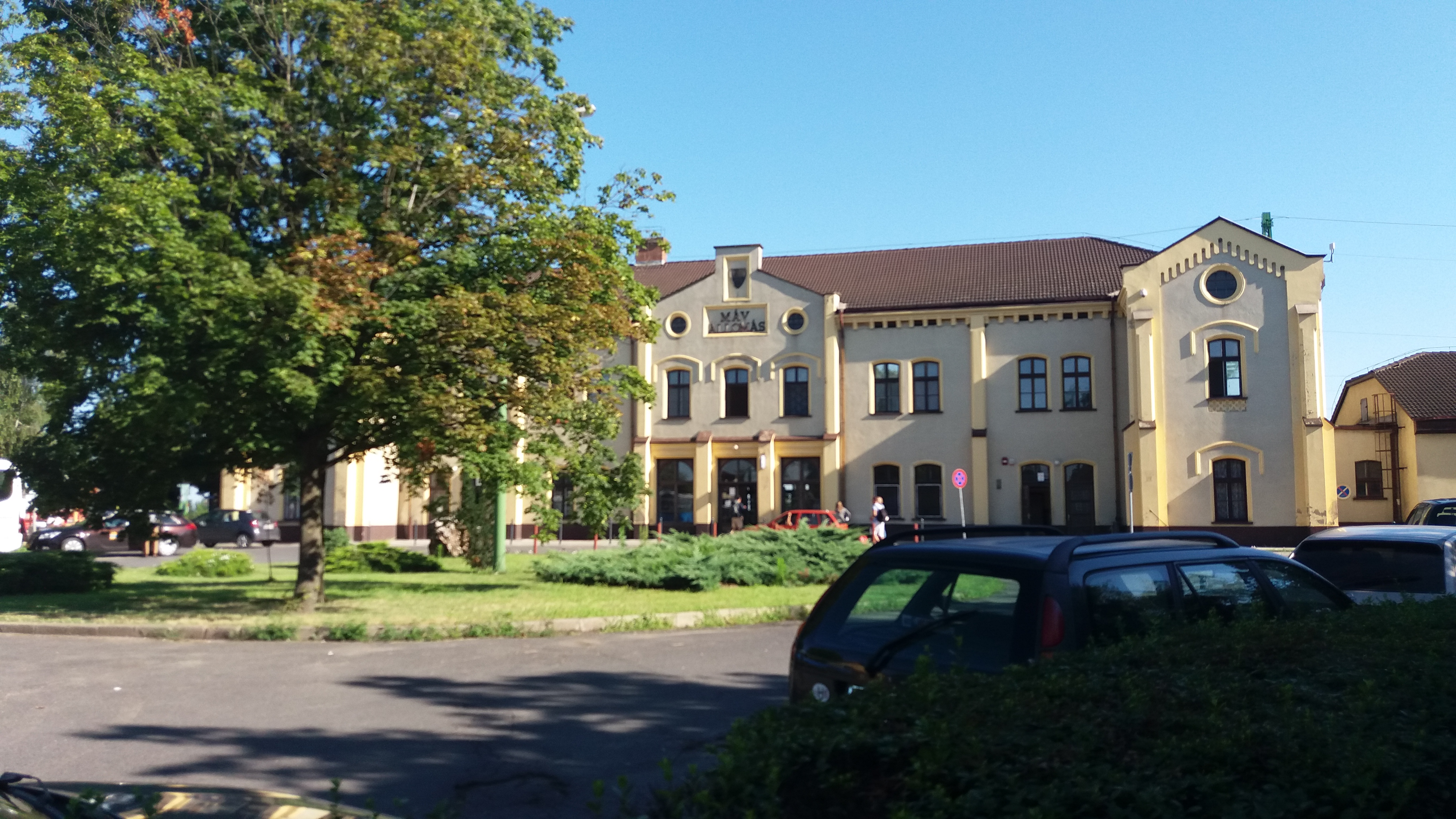
Püspökladány, the district seat

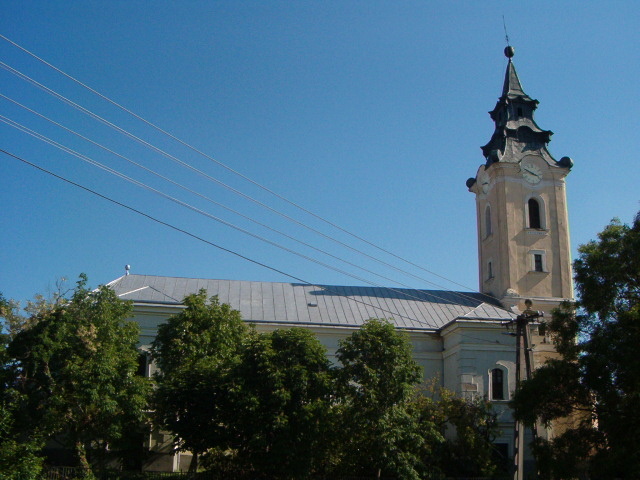
Reformed Church in Földes

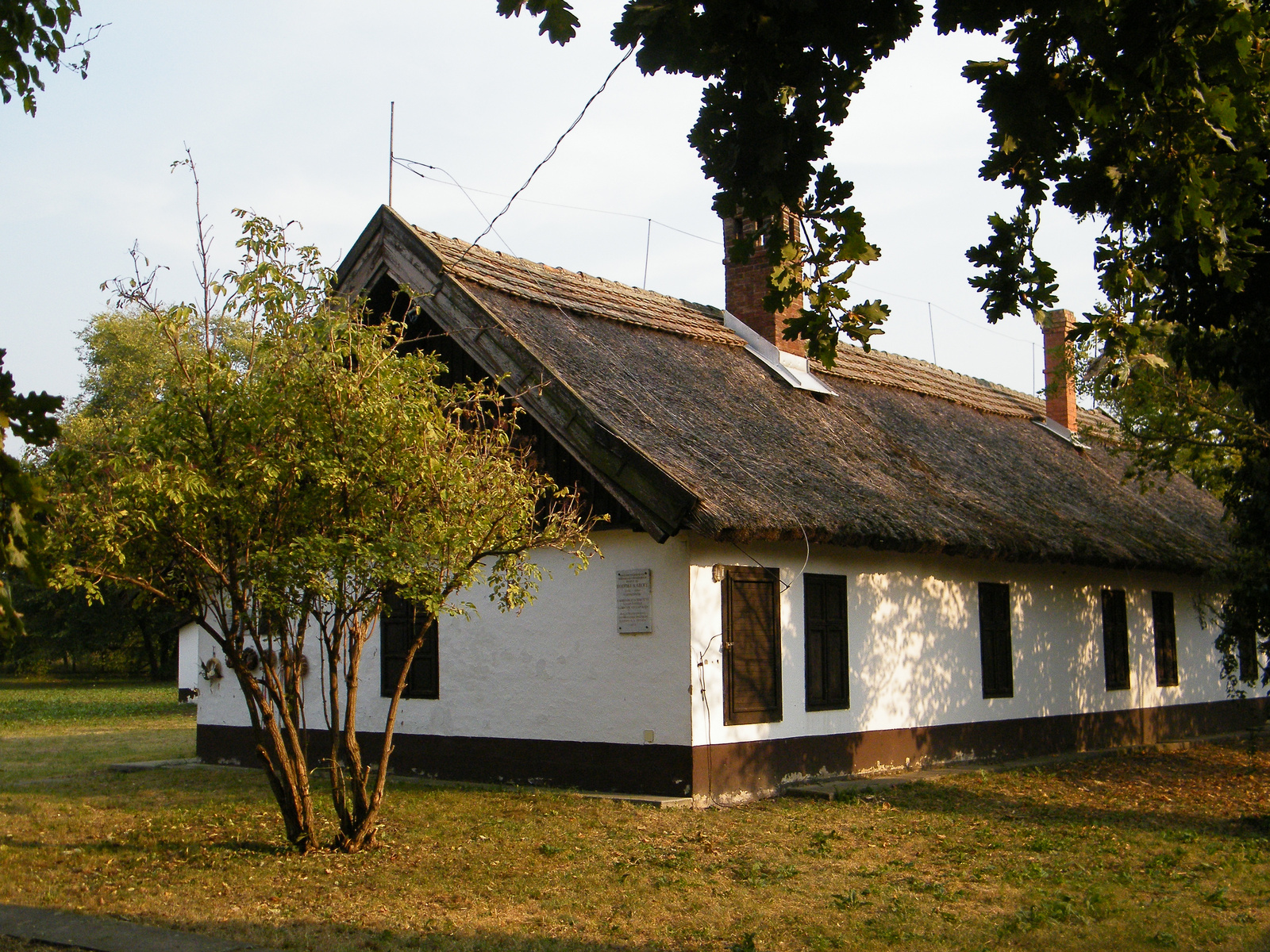
Traditional house from Biharnagybajom

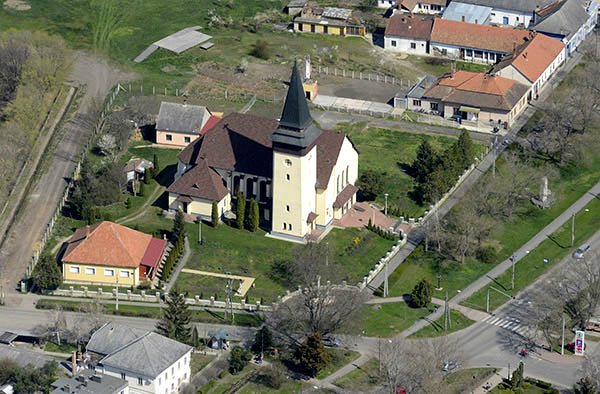
Aerial view of Püspökladány

== See also ==
- List of cities and towns of Hungary
