= Hajdúszoboszló District =

Coordinates: 47.4667°N 21.3833°E

Hajdúszoboszló District Hajdúszoboszlói járás
- Districts of Hungary
- Flag Coat of arms

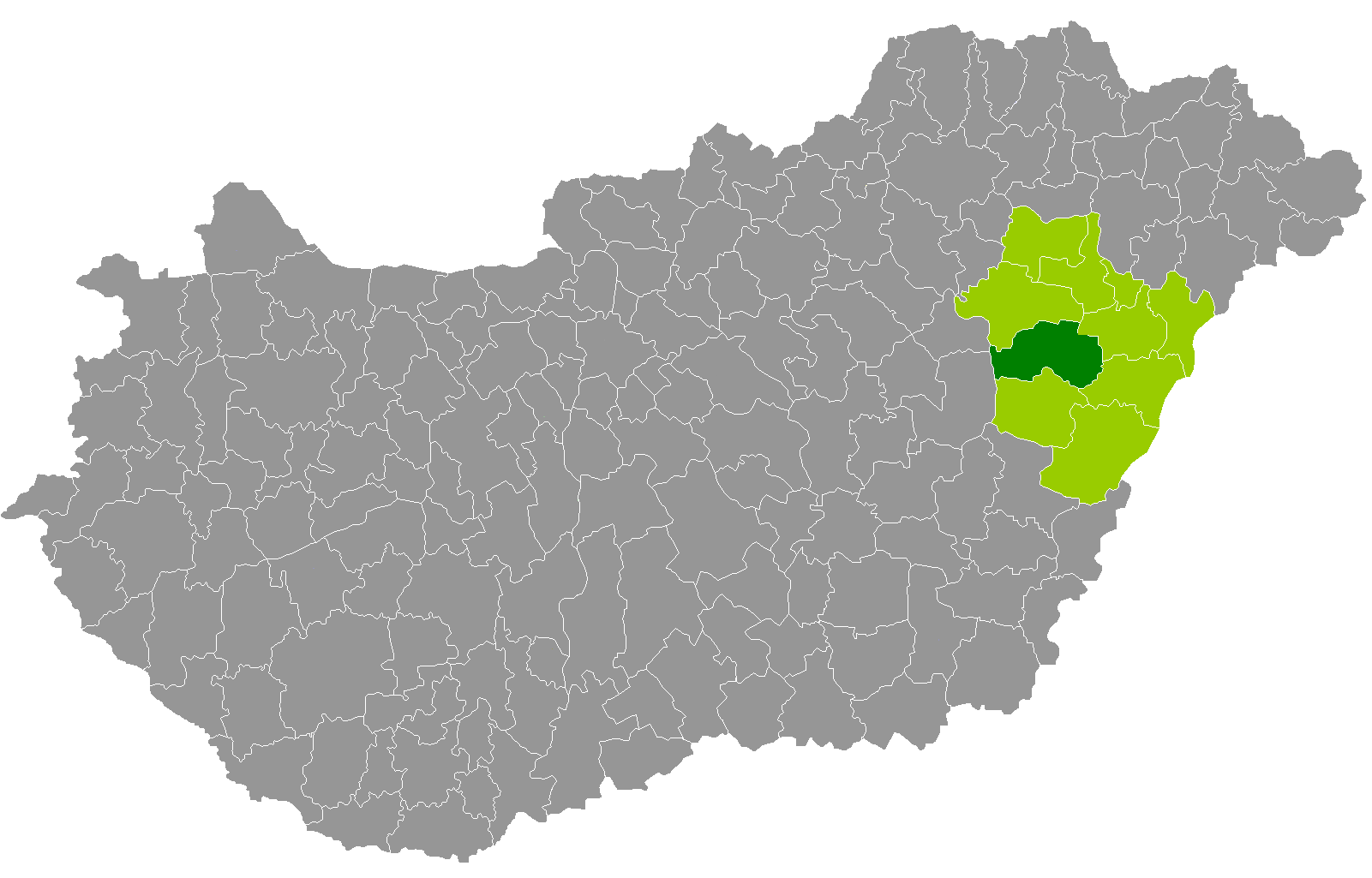
- Hajdúszoboszló District within Hungary and Hajdú-Bihar County.
- Country: Hungary
- County: Hajdú-Bihar
- District seat: Hajdúszoboszló

Area
  - Total: 732.65 km^{2} (282.88 sq mi)
  - Rank: 3rd in Hajdú-Bihar

Population (2011 census)
  - Total: 43,061
  - Rank: 3rd in Hajdú-Bihar
  - Density: 59/km^{2} (150/sq mi)

Hajdúszoboszló (Hungarian: Hajdúszoboszlói járás) is a district in western part of Hajdú-Bihar County. Hajdúszoboszló is also the name of the town where the district seat is found. The district is located in the Northern Great Plain Statistical Region. This district is a part of Hajdúság historical and geographical region.

== Geography ==
Hajdúszoboszló District borders with Balmazújváros District to the north, Debrecen District and Derecske District to the east, Püspökladány District to the south, Karcag District (Jász-Nagykun-Szolnok County) to the west. The number of inhabited places in Hajdúszoboszló District is 5.

== Municipalities ==
The district has 2 towns and 3 villages. (ordered by population, as of 1 January 2012)

- Ebes (4,390)
- **Hajdúszoboszló** (23,309) – district seat
- Hajdúszovát (3,038)
- Nagyhegyes (2,750)
- **Nádudvar** (8,768)

The bolded municipalities are cities.

== Demographics ==
Religion in Hajdúszoboszló District (2011 census)
1. Calvinism (26.2%)
2. Lutheranism (0.10%)
3. Catholic Church (6.10%)
4. Greek Catholicism (1.20%)
5. Other religions (1.00%)
6. Non-religious (40.0%)
7. Atheists (0.90%)
8. Undeclared (24.5%)

In 2011, it had a population of 43,061 and the population density was 55/km².

Year	County population	Change
2011	43,061	n/a

=== Ethnicity ===
Besides the Hungarian majority, the main minorities are the Roma (approx. 650) and German (300) and Romanian (100).

Total population (2011 census): 43,061
Ethnic groups (2011 census): Identified themselves: 38,155 persons:

- Hungarians: 36,770 (96.37%)
- Gypsies: 618 (1.62%)
- Others and indefinable: 767 (2.01%)

Approx. 5,000 persons in Hajdúszoboszló District did not declare their ethnic group at the 2011 census.

=== Religion ===
Religious adherence in the county according to 2011 census:

- Reformed – 11,291;
- Catholic – 3,124 (Roman Catholic – 2,607; Greek Catholic – 517);
- Evangelical – 51;
- other religions – 439;
- Non-religious – 17,235;
- Atheism – 388;
- Undeclared – 10,533.

== Gallery ==
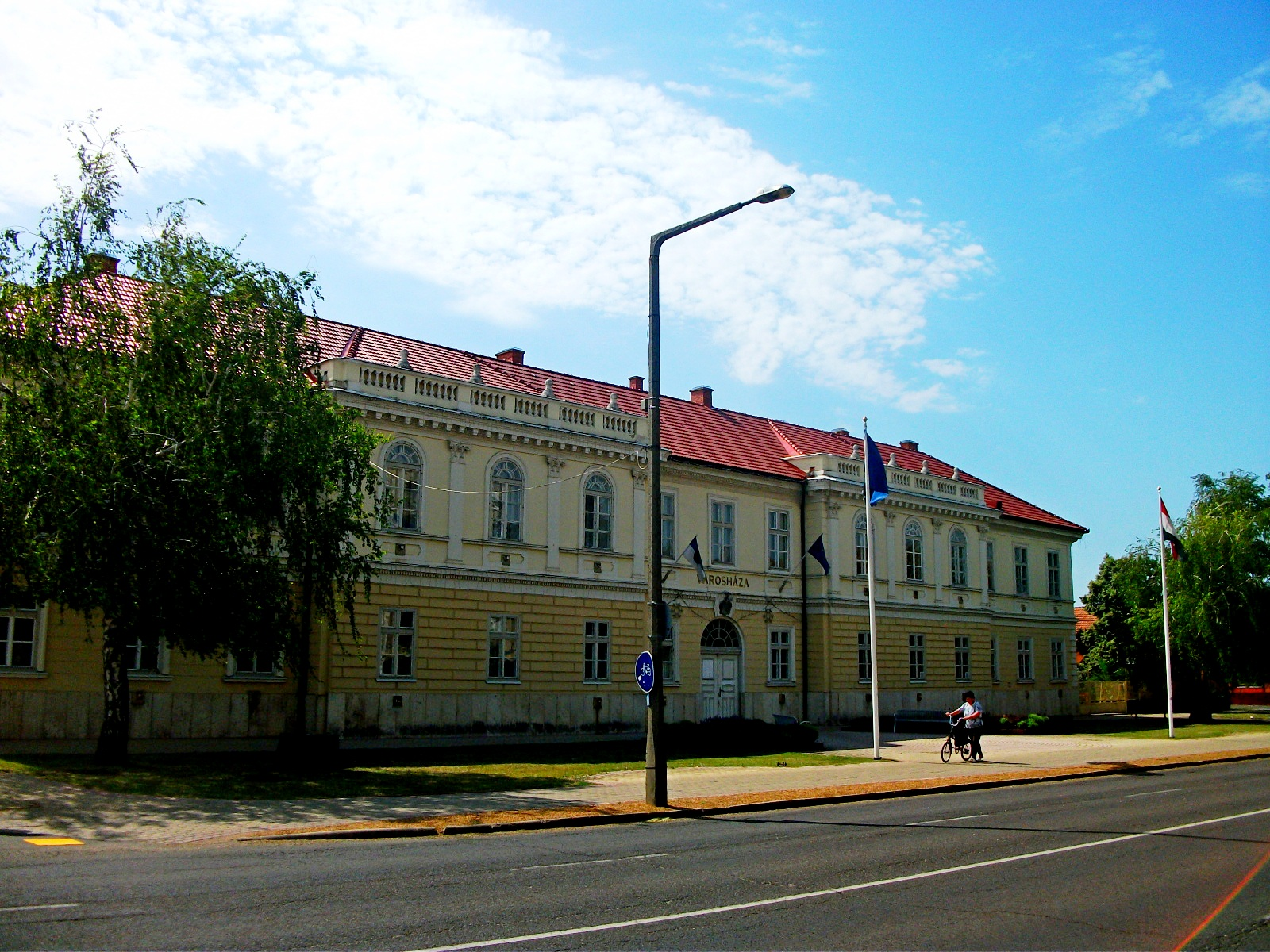
Hajdúszoboszló, Town Hall

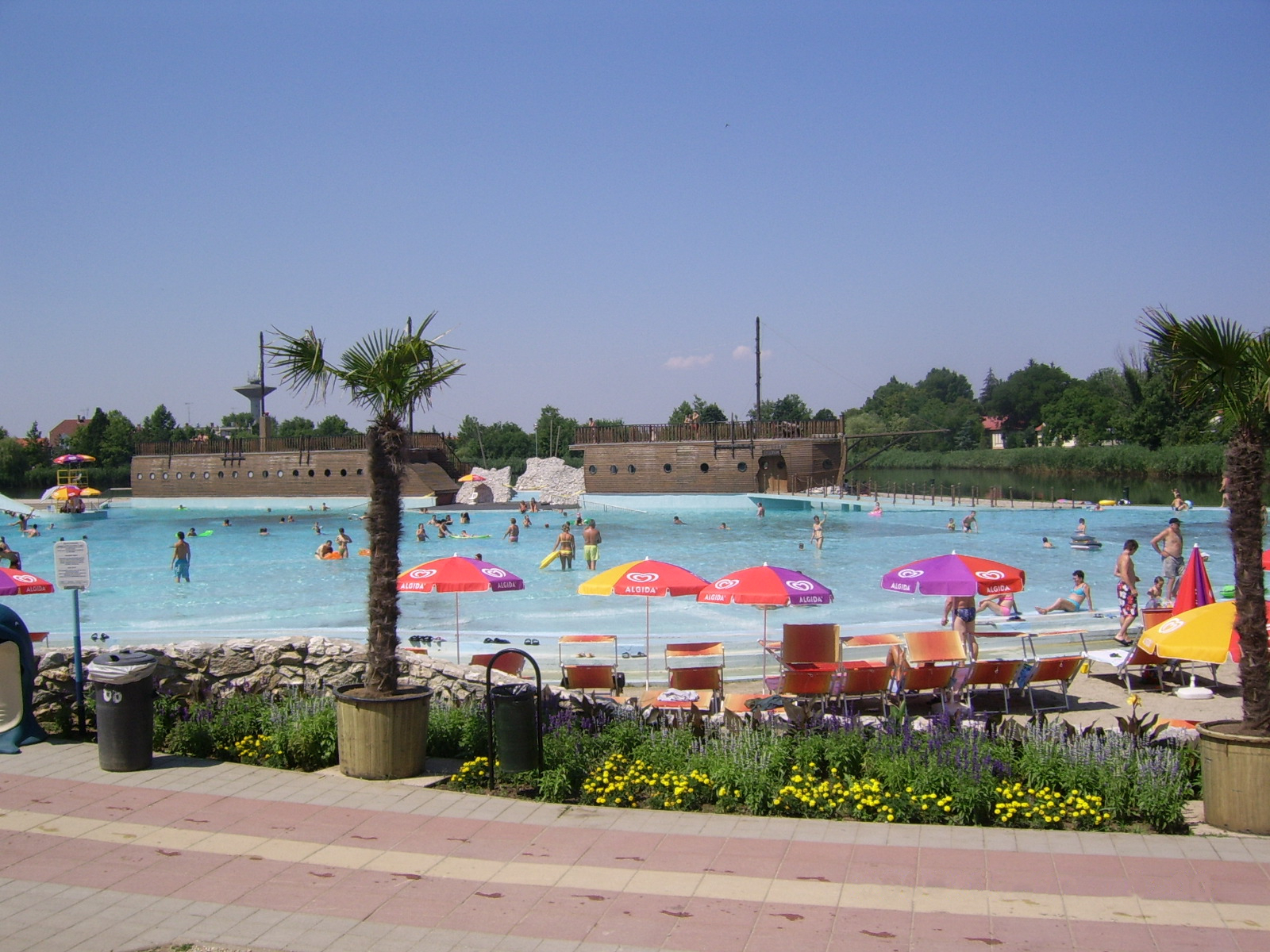
Spa in Hajdúszoboszló

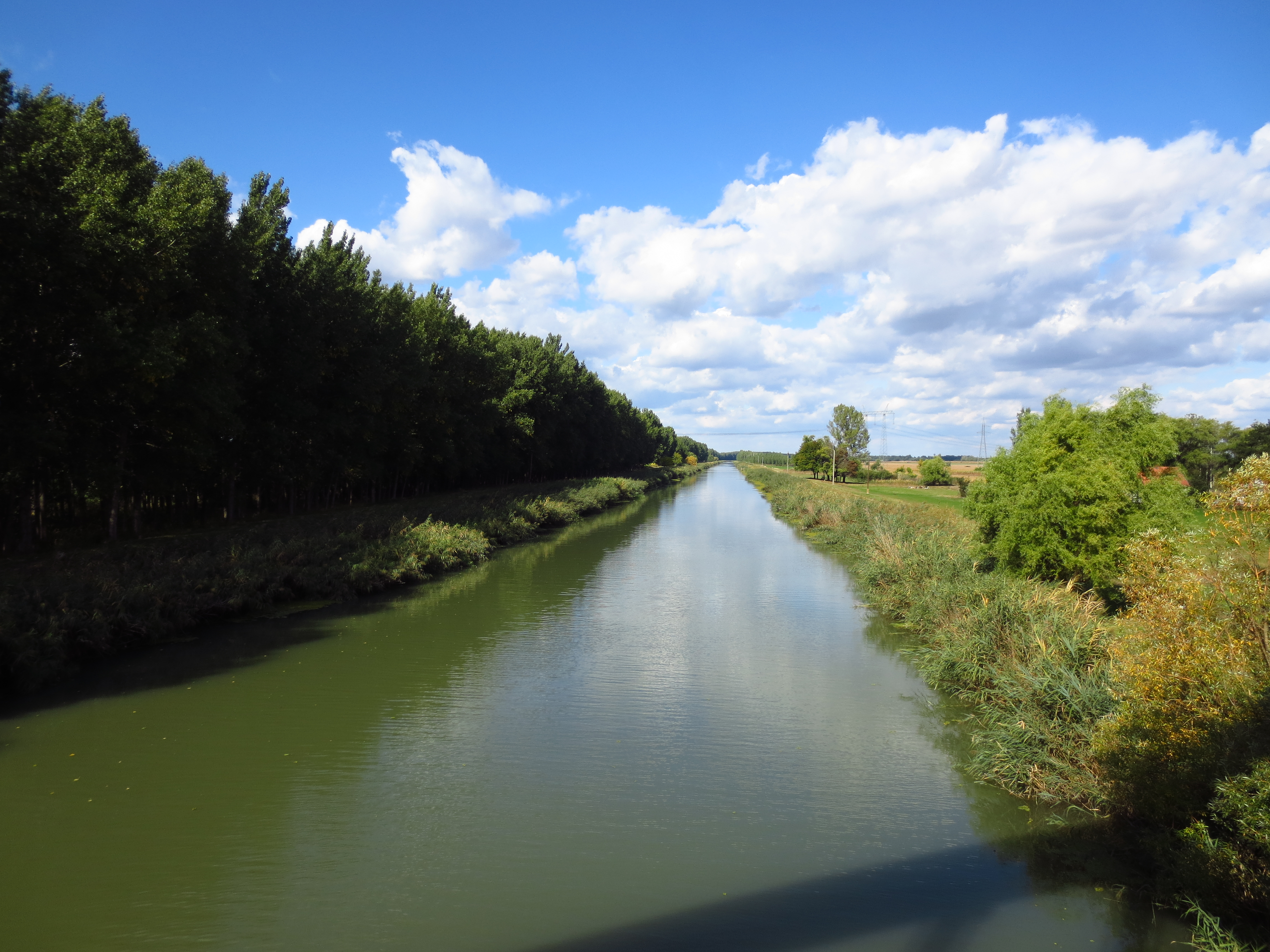
Keleti Canal near Nagyhegyes

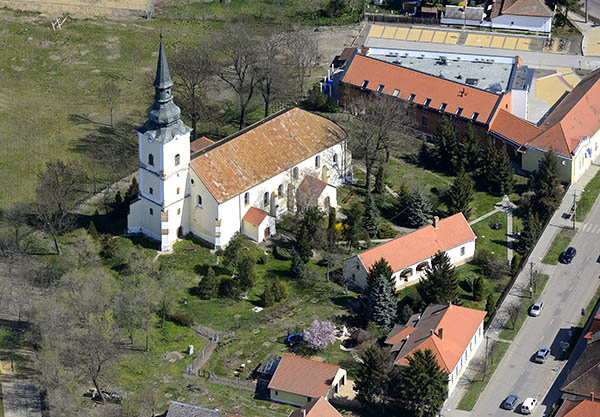
Reformed Church in Nádudvar

== See also ==
- List of cities and towns of Hungary
