= Oradea ghetto =

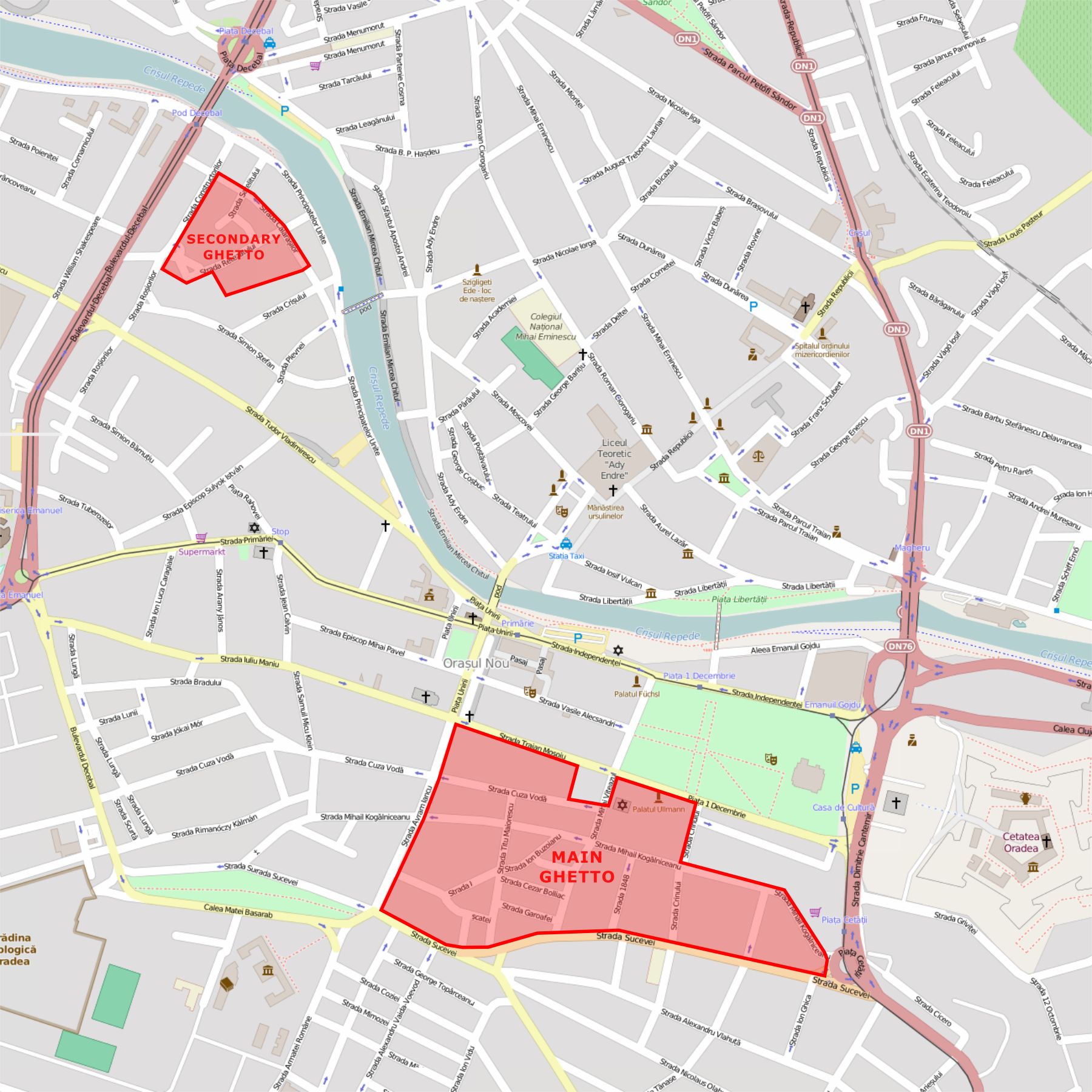
Map of the Oradea ghettos

The Oradea ghetto was one of the Nazi-era ghettos for European Jews during World War II. It was located in the city of Oradea (Hungarian: Nagyvárad) in Bihor County, Transylvania, now part of Romania but administered as part of Bihar County by the Kingdom of Hungary from the 1940 Second Vienna Award's grant of Northern Transylvania until late 1944. The ghetto was active in the spring of 1944, following Operation Margarethe.

== History ==
Aside from the Budapest ghetto, this was the largest ghetto in Hungary. There were in fact two ghettoes in the city. The first, for Oradea's Jews, numbered 27,000 inhabitants and was situated near the Orthodox synagogue and the Great Square. The second contained nearly 8,000 Jews from the many rural communities of a dozen districts: Aleșd, Berettyóújfalu, Biharkeresztes, Cefa, Derecske, Marghita, Oradea, Săcueni, Sălard, Salonta, Sárrétudvari and Valea lui Mihai. Many Jews from these communities were also placed around the Mezey lumber yard.

The ghetto was strikingly overpopulated. The Oradea Jews, who formed 30% of the city's population, were crowded into an area sufficient for one-fifteenth of the city. Conditions were such that one room had to shelter fourteen or fifteen Jews. As in other ghettoes, Oradea's suffered from a lack of food and drink. The local authorities, unusually vehement in their anti-Semitism, created victims with their punitive measures. They often interrupted the flow of electricity and water to the ghetto. Furthermore, the gendarmes, commanded by lieutenant-colonel Jenő Péterffy, were especially sadistic in their searches for valuables, which took place right by the ghetto in the Dréher brewery. Internal administration took place under the auspices of a Judenrat headed by Sándor Leitner, leader of the local Orthodox Jewish community. In the spring of 1944, the ghetto was evacuated in nine transports, the first two from the lumber yard and the remainder from the city: May 23 (3,110), May 25 (3,148), May 28 (3,227), May 29 (3,166), May 30 (3,187), June 1 (3,059), June 3 (2,972), June 5 (2,527), June 27 (2,819). Thus, with 6,258 Jews in the first category and 20,957 in the second, a total of 27,215 Jews were sent to the Auschwitz concentration camp.

The June 27 transport involved Jews from the part of Bihar County that remained in Hungary following the Treaty of Trianon. Coming from small communities south and southeast of Debrecen, such as Derecske and Konyár, they were brought to Oradea on June 16–17. Thus, while the ghetto was originally part of the Cluj military district, it was transferred to the Debrecen district during the period when this last group of deportees lived there.
