= Sándor Bodó =

Hungarian politician

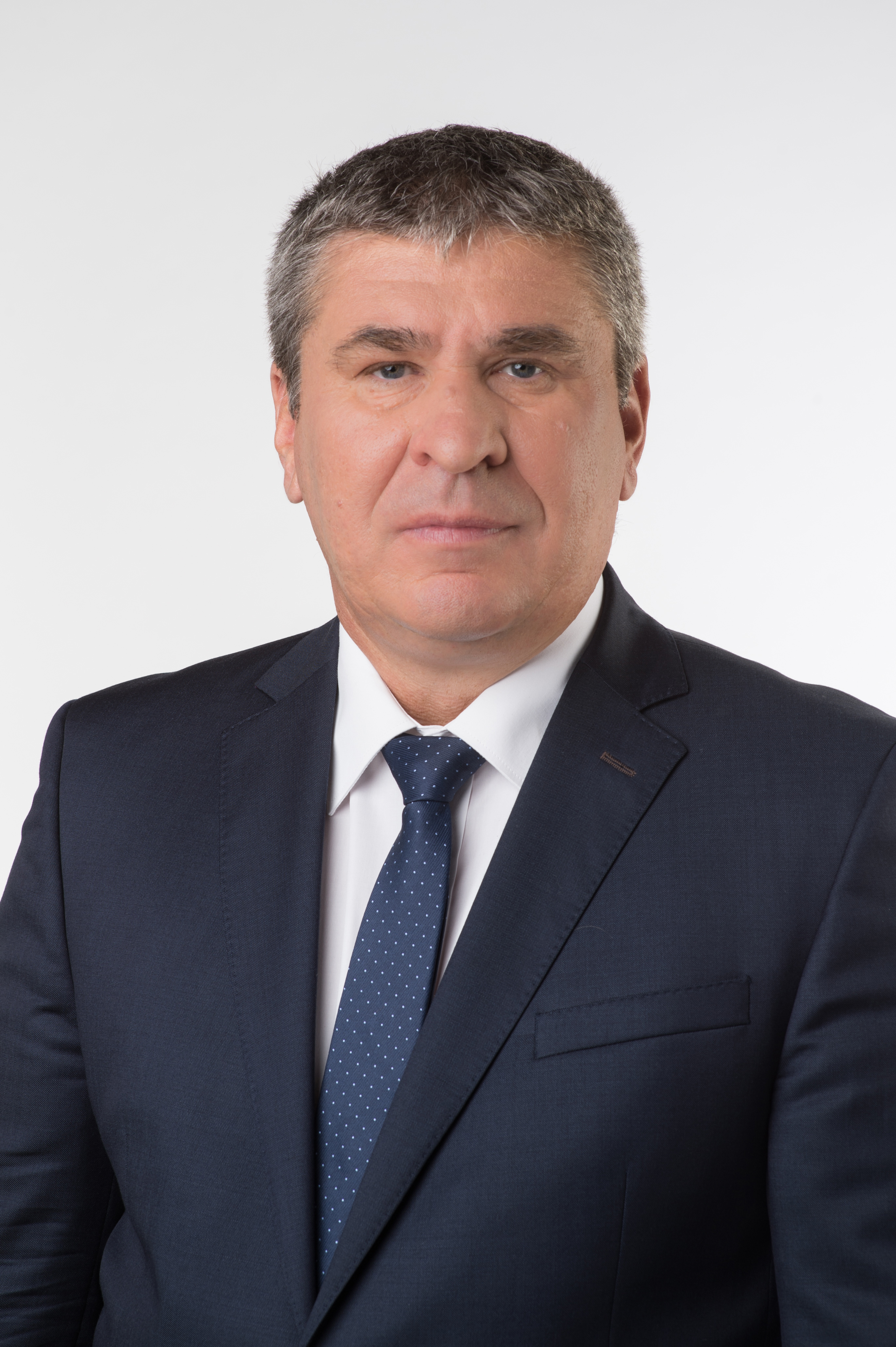
- Bodó in 2018

Member of the National Assembly
- In office 24 October 2011 – 8 May 2026

Personal details
- Born: 25 November 1963 (age 62) Püspökladány, Hungary
- Party: Fidesz
- Spouse: Edit Madar
- Children: 2
- Profession: politician

Sándor Bodó (born 25 November 1963) is a Hungarian politician, member of the National Assembly (MP) for Püspökladány, Hajdú-Bihar County (Constituency VI) from 2011 to 2014, and for Hajdúszoboszló (Hajdú-Bihar County Constituency V) from 2014 to 2026. He served as President of the General Assembly of Hajdú-Bihar County from 2011 to 2014.

Sándor Arnóth, the MP (and mayor) for Püspökladány (Hajdú-Bihar County Constituency VI) died in a car accident on 16 March 2011. At the third round of the by-election on 16 October 2011 Bodó was elected with 51% of the vote before István Rigán (Jobbik), Ildikó Bangó (MSZP) and Róbert Bányász (SZU). He became a member of the Committee on Audit Office and Budget. From 5 March 2012 he worked in the Committee on Education, Science and Research. He was appointed a member of the Committee on Budgets in May 2014.

Bodó was appointed Secretary of State for Employment Policy and Corporate Relations on 13 June 2018, replacing Péter Cseresnyés.

== Personal life ==
He is married. His wife is Edit Bodóné Madar. They have a daughter, Sára and a son, Bence.
