= Balmazújváros District =

Balmazújváros District Balmazújvárosi járás
- District
- Coat of arms

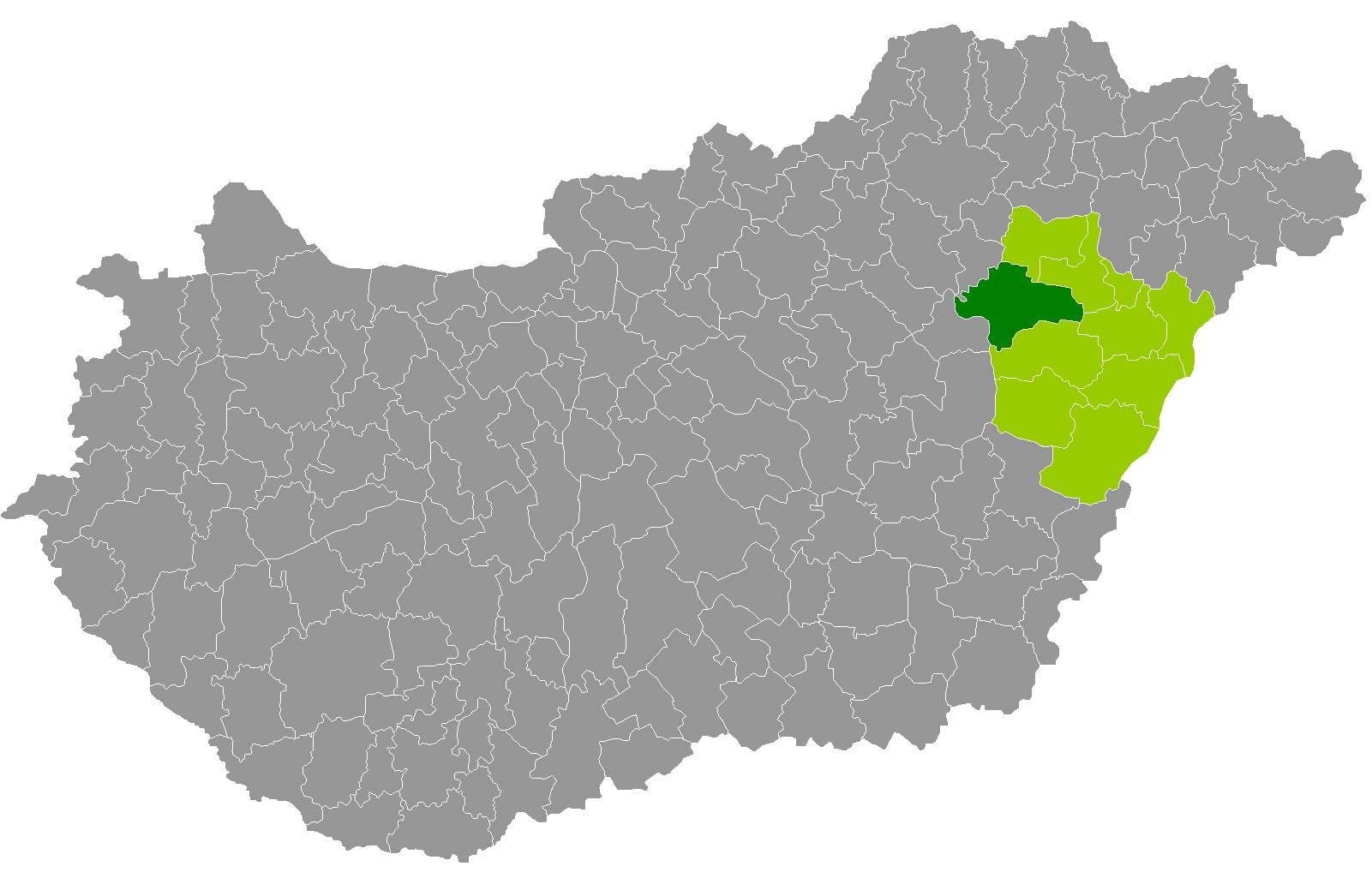
- Balmazújváros District within Hungary and Hajdú-Bihar County.
- Country: Hungary
- County: Hajdú-Bihar
- District seat: Balmazújváros

Area
  - Total: 827.45 km^{2} (319.48 sq mi)
  - Rank: 2nd in Hajdú-Bihar

Population (2011 census)
  - Total: 30,191
  - Rank: 7th in Hajdú-Bihar
  - Density: 36/km^{2} (93/sq mi)

Balmazújváros (Hungarian: Balmazújvárosi járás) is a district in north-western part of Hajdú-Bihar County. Balmazújváros is also the name of the town where the district seat is found. The district is located in the Northern Great Plain Statistical Region. This district is a part of Hajdúság historical and geographical region.

== Geography ==
Balmazújváros District borders with Mezőcsát District (Borsod-Abaúj-Zemplén County) and Hajdúnánás District to the north, Hajdúböszörmény District and Debrecen District to the east, Hajdúszoboszló District to the south, Tiszafüred District (Jász-Nagykun-Szolnok County) to the west. The number of the inhabited places in Balmazújváros District is 5.

== Municipalities ==
The district has 2 towns, 1 large village and 2 villages. (ordered by population, as of 1 January 2012)

- **Balmazújváros** (17,354) – district seat
- Egyek (4,895)
- Hortobágy (1,487)
- Újszentmargita (1,399)
- **Tiszacsege** (4,481)

The bolded municipalities are cities, italics municipality is large village.

== Demographics ==
Religion in Balmazújváros District (2011 census)
1. Calvinism (18.4%)
2. Catholic Church (15.5%)
3. Greek Catholicism (0.60%)
4. Other religions (1.40%)
5. Non-religious (38.0%)
6. Atheists (1.30%)
7. Undeclared (24.8%)

In 2011, it had a population of 30,191 and the population density was 36/km^{2}.

Year	County population	Change
2011	30,191	n/a

=== Ethnicity ===
Besides the Hungarian majority, the main minorities are the Roma (approx. 2,000) and German (200).

Total population (2011 census): 30,191
Ethnic groups (2011 census): Identified themselves: 28,278 persons:

- Hungarians: 25,928 (91.69%)
- Gypsies: 1,976 (6.99%)
- Others and indefinable: 374 (1.32%)

Approx. 2,000 persons in Balmazújváros District did not declare their ethnic group at the 2011 census.

=== Religion ===
Religious adherence in the county according to 2011 census:

- Reformed – 5,562;
- Catholic – 4,839 (Roman Catholic – 4,674; Greek Catholic – 164);
- other religions – 424;
- Non-religious – 11,484;
- Atheism – 393;
- Undeclared – 7,489.

== Gallery ==
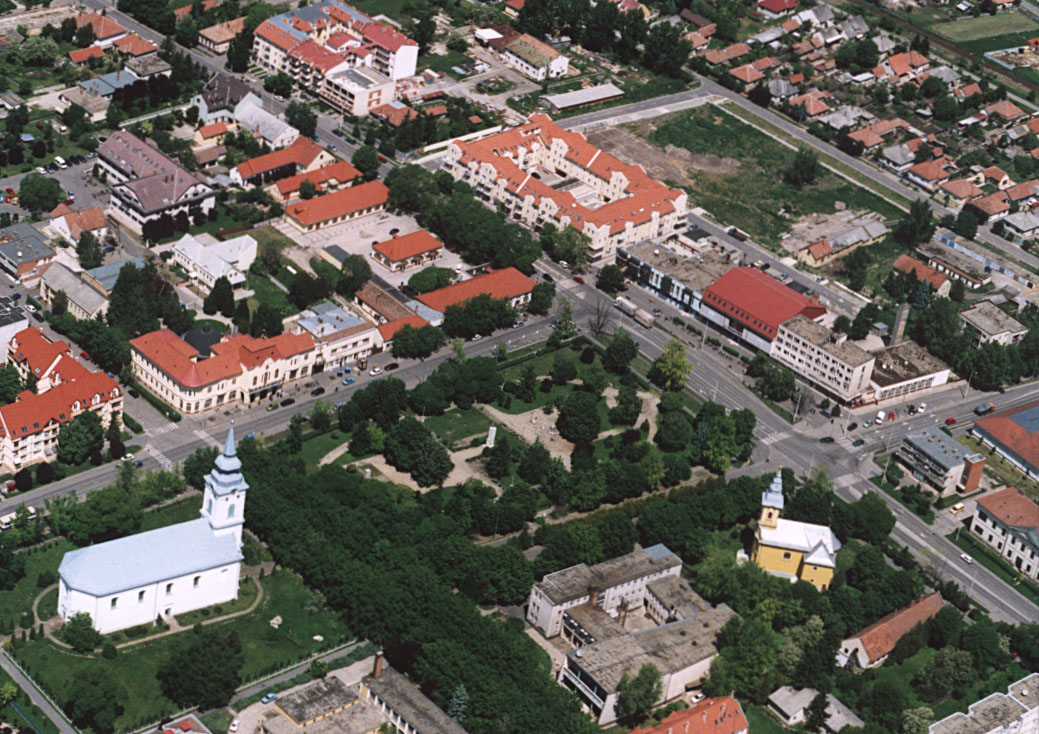
Balmazújváros, the district seat

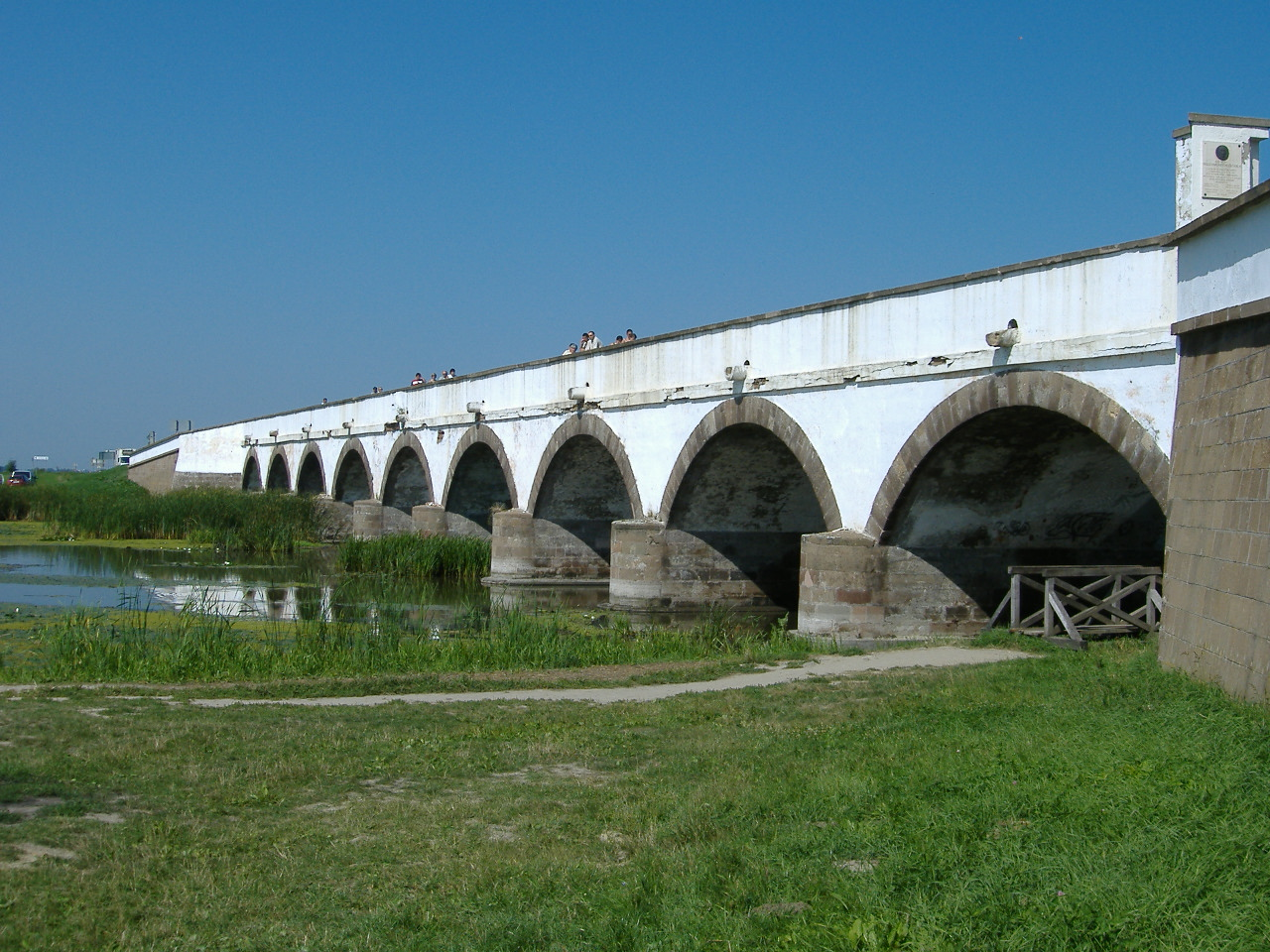
Nine-holed Bridge

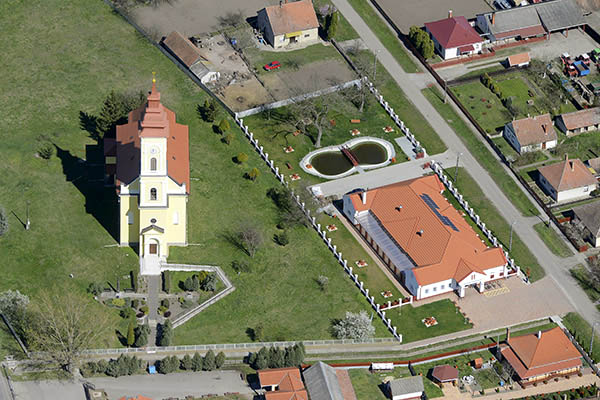
Aerial view of Újszentmargita

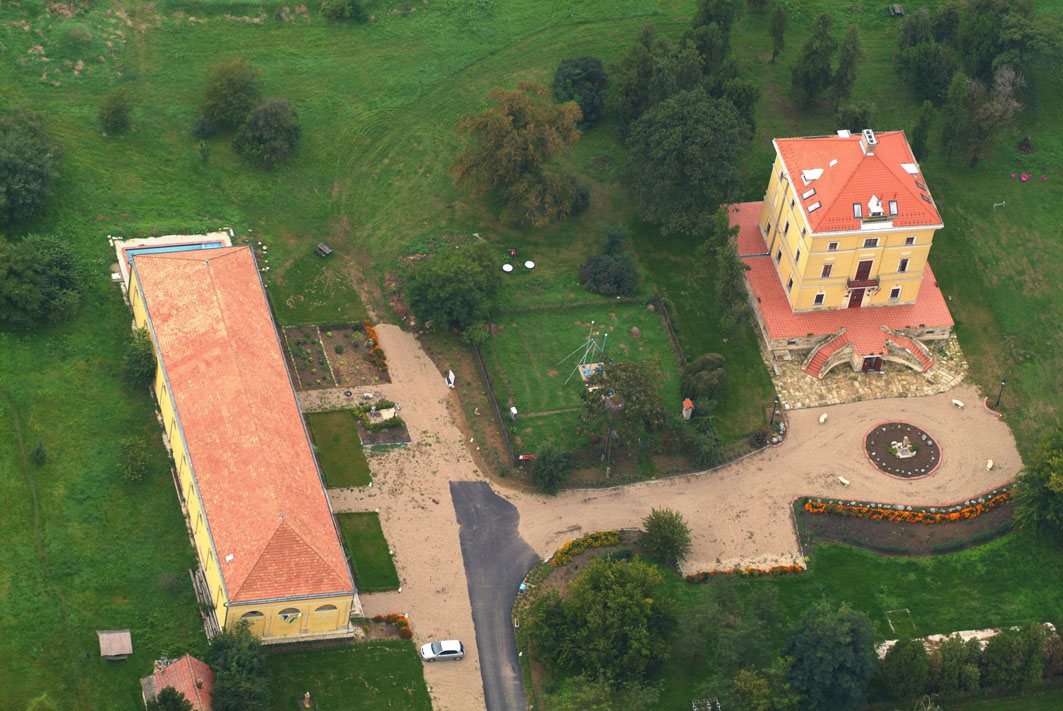
Vay Palace in Tiszacsege

== See also ==
- List of cities and towns of Hungary
