= Derecske District =

Coordinates: 47.3667°N 21.7333°E

Derecske District Derecskei járás
- Districts of Hungary
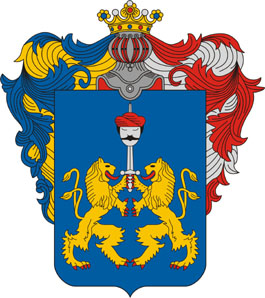
- Coat of arms

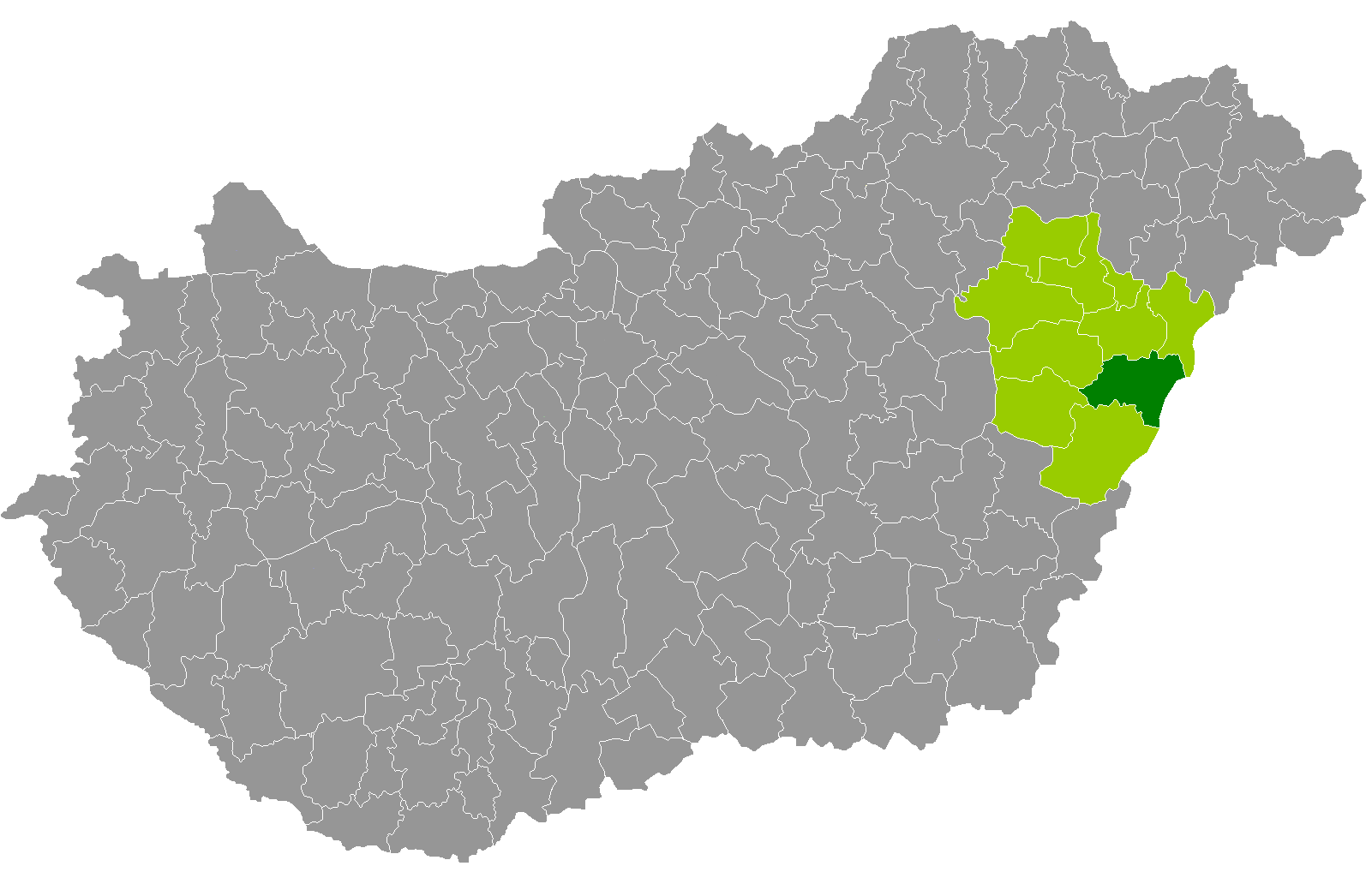
- Derecske District within Hungary and Hajdú-Bihar County.
- Country: Hungary
- County: Hajdú-Bihar
- District seat: Derecske

Area
  - Total: 650.30 km^{2} (251.08 sq mi)
  - Rank: 5th in Hajdú-Bihar

Population (2011 census)
  - Total: 41,701
  - Rank: 4th in Hajdú-Bihar
  - Density: 64/km^{2} (170/sq mi)

Derecske (Hungarian: Derecskei járás) is a district in central-eastern part of Hajdú-Bihar County. Derecske is also the name of the town where the district seat is found. The district is located in the Northern Great Plain Statistical Region.

== Geography ==
Derecske District borders with Debrecen District and Nyíradony District to the north, the Romanian county of Bihor to the east, Berettyóújfalu District to the south, Püspökladány District and Hajdúszoboszló District to the west. The number of the inhabited places in Derecske District is 13.

== Municipalities ==
The district has 2 towns, 2 large villages and 9 villages. (ordered by population, as of 1 January 2012)

- **Derecske** (8,906) – district seat
- Esztár (1,366)
- Hajdúbagos (1,972)
- Hosszúpályi (5,854)
- Kismarja (1,210)
- Kokad (619)
- Konyár (2,010)
- **Létavértes** (7,090)
- Mikepércs (4,434)
- Monostorpályi (2,136)
- Pocsaj (2,579)
- Sáránd (2,238)
- Tépe (1,119)

The bolded municipalities are cities, italics municipalities are large villages.

== Demographics ==
Religion in Derecske District (2011 census)
1. Calvinism (45.5%)
2. Catholic Church (6.90%)
3. Greek Catholicism (6.10%)
4. Other religions (1.50%)
5. Non-religious (20.6%)
6. Atheists (0.50%)
7. Undeclared (18.9%)

In 2011, it had a population of 41,701 and the population density was 64/km^{2}.

Year	County population	Change
2011	41,701	n/a

=== Ethnicity ===
Besides the Hungarian majority, the main minorities are the Roma (approx. 2,000) and Romanian (300).

Total population (2011 census): 41,701
Ethnic groups (2011 census): Identified themselves: 40,738 persons:

- Hungarians: 37,464 (91.96%)
- Gypsies: 2,657 (6.52%)
- Others and indefinable: 617 (1.51%)

Approx. 2,000 persons in Derecske District did not declare their ethnic group at the 2011 census.

=== Religion ===
Religious adherence in the county according to 2011 census:

- Reformed – 18,989;
- Catholic – 5,410 (Roman Catholic – 2,872; Greek Catholic – 2,537);
- other religions – 628;
- Non-religious – 8,603;
- Atheism – 235;
- Undeclared – 7,836.

== Gallery ==
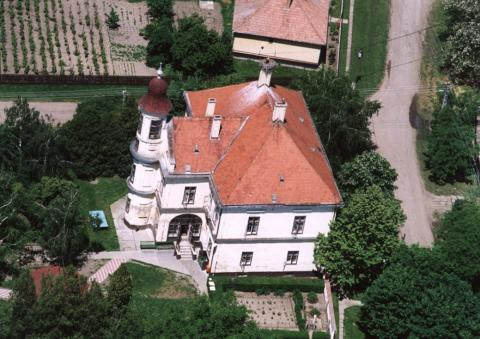
Aerial view of Tépe

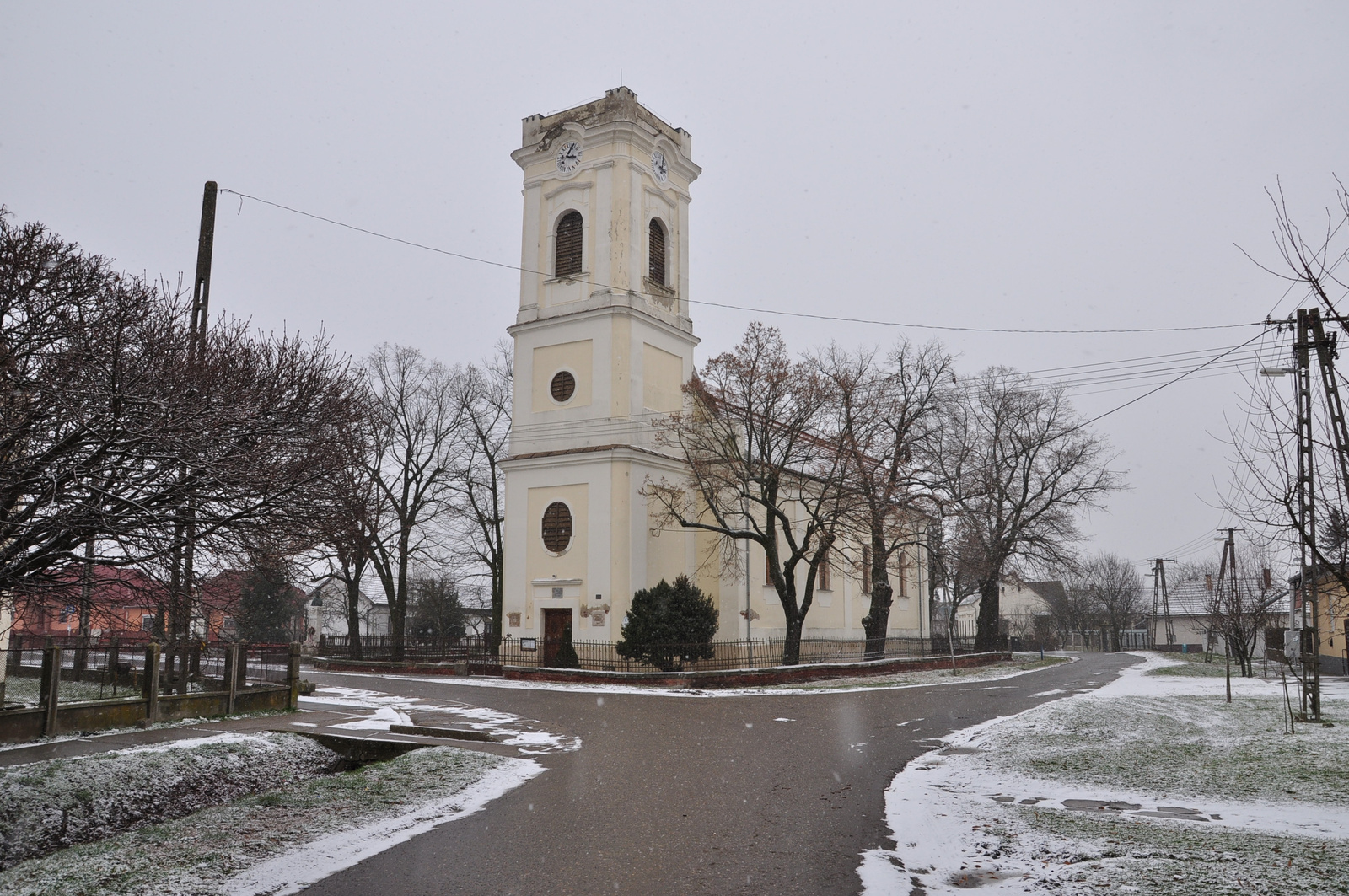
Reformed Church in Kismarja

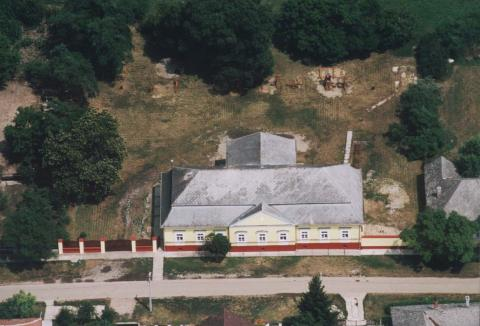
Erdődy Mansion in Esztár

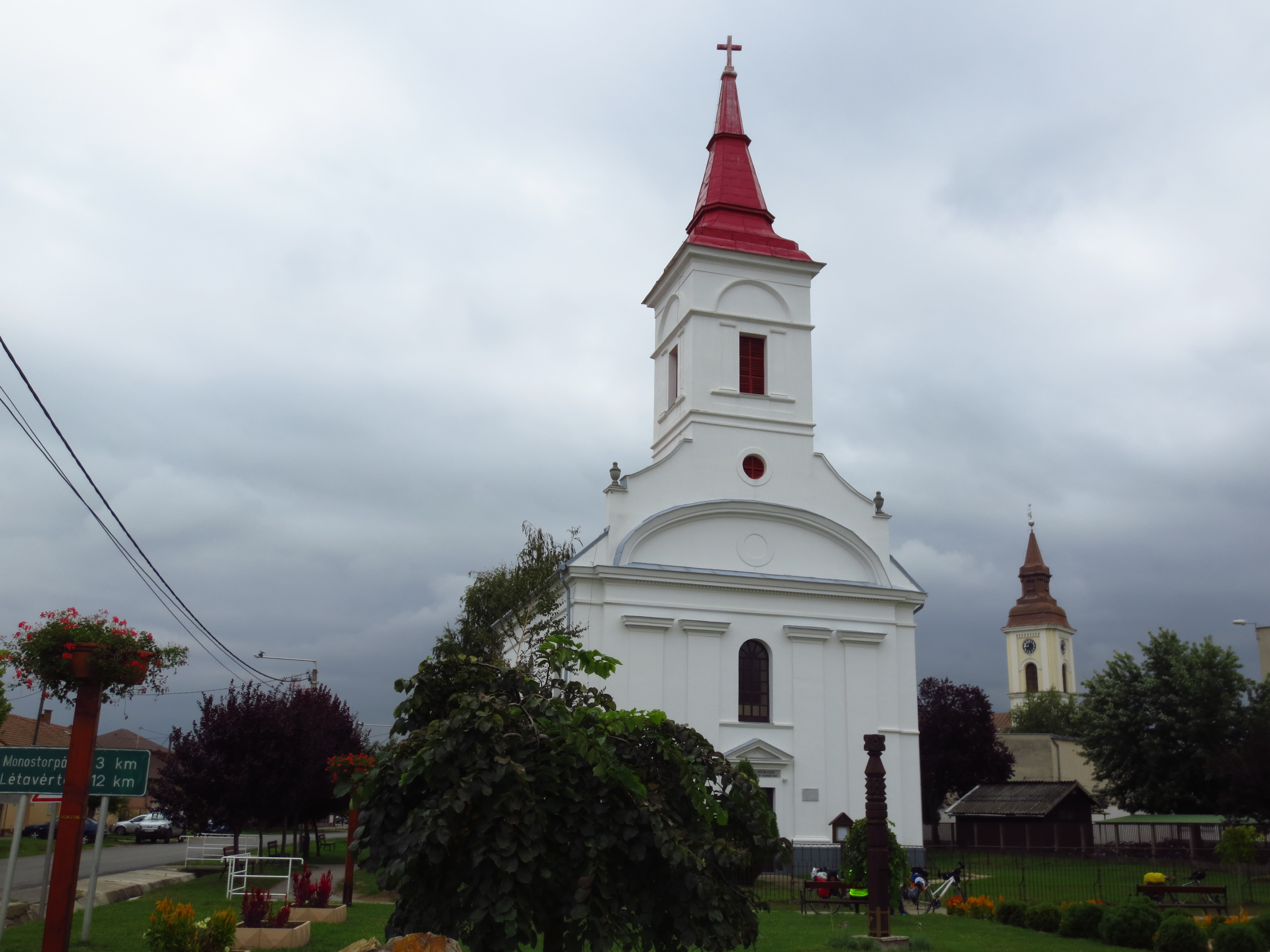
Church of Immaculate Conception in Hosszúpályi

== See also ==
- List of cities and towns of Hungary
