= Sándor Leitner =

Jewish council member in Hungary

- Born: Joszéf Leitner; 5 November 1889; Nagyvárad, Austria-Hungary (present-day Oradea, Romania)
- Died: 1972 (aged 82–83); Geneva, Switzerland
- Known for: head of the Judenrat in Oradea ghetto
- Spouse: Róza Blau

Sándor Leitner (born Joszéf Leitner; 5 November 1889 – 1972) was a Hungarian Jewish merchant and religious leader in the Kingdom of Romania. He presided the Judenrat in the Oradea ghetto during the Holocaust.

== Career ==
Sándor Leitner was born as Joszéf Leitner into an Orthodox Jewish family in Nagyvárad, Austria-Hungary (present-day Oradea, Romania) on 5 November 1889, as the son of wealthy textile manufacturer Márton (Mordekháj) Leitner and Chaja Leitner. The family company was considered one of the largest wholesalers in Romania in the early 1930s.

Beside his business activity, Leitner functioned as principal of the local Orthodox Jewish gymnasium from 1930 to 1933 and from 1938 to 1941. He was referred to as Agudath member of the Orthodox religious congregation of Oradea in 1926. He became a leading member of the Zionist Mizrachi movement in his hometown by 1939. Leitner was elected president of the Orthodox Jewish congregation of Oradea in December 1941, succeeding his mentor István Ullmann, who died in labour service.

== The Holocaust ==
Northern Transylvania, including Oradea (Nagyvárad) and its area, was ceded by Romania to Hungary in the Second Vienna Award in September 1940. Following the German invasion of Hungary in March 1944, Leitner participated in that general meeting of the Jewish leaders in Budapest on 28 March, where the Central Jewish Council was established upon the demand of the German authorities. In his diary-like memoir written many years after the events, Leitner recalled that the crematoria, the concentration camps and the mass murders were also discussed during the meeting. Returning Nagyvárad, Leitner became head of the Judenrat there. Simultaneously, the ghetto was established which then was the largest such structure in Hungary. It numbered 27,000 inhabitants and was situated near the Orthodox synagogue and the Great Square. Leitner and his colleagues established a housing department, which managed the removal of Jews from their apartments, the proper assignment of the vacated properties for German and Hungarian needs and the moving of different relatives and families together. In his diary, Leitner noted in an ironic tone that "there was an equalization between the [social] classes that no socialist scientist could ever even dream of" in the main ghetto.

Under Leitner, the council managed soup kitchen, hospital and public sanitation office, and even a cultural department within the ghetto. He received one hundred liters of milk for the children of the ghetto, but due to overpopulation, even this measure turned out to be insufficient. Leitner and the other council members were subject of constant harassment by the local gendarmerie and police. These units interrogated and tortured several councilors for alleged "hidden treasures" before their deportation. In Nagyvárad, the gendarmes commanded by lieutenant-colonel Jenő Péterffy, were especially sadistic in their searches for valuables, which took place right by the ghetto in the Dreher brewery. Leitner and his elderly parents were also beaten and tortured during these raids.

== Later life ==
Upon the intercession of the Central Jewish Council, Leitner, his wife Róza Blau (b. 1895) and their two children Félix (b. 1921) and Marianne (b. 1924) were allowed to board the so-called Kastner train and, through Bergen-Belsen, leave for Switzerland in late June 1944, because of Leitner's former activity in the Zionist movement. However, his parents and his brother were deported to the Auschwitz concentration camp. Leitner died in Geneva in 1972. He was buried in Jerusalem.

== Sources ==
- Veszprémy, László Bernát (2021). "Kik vezették a vidéki zsidó tanácsokat? [Who led the rural Jewish councils?]". Múlt és Jövő (Új folyam) (in Hungarian). 32 (1): 101–117. ISSN 0864-8646.
- Veszprémy, László Bernát (2023). Tanácstalanság. A zsidó vezetés Magyarországon és a holokauszt, 1944–1945 [Bereft of Council. Jewish leadership in Hungary during the Holocaust in 1944–1945] (in Hungarian). Budapest: Jaffa Kiadó. ISBN 978-963-475-731-3.
