= Sándor Arnóth =

Hungarian politician (1960–2011)

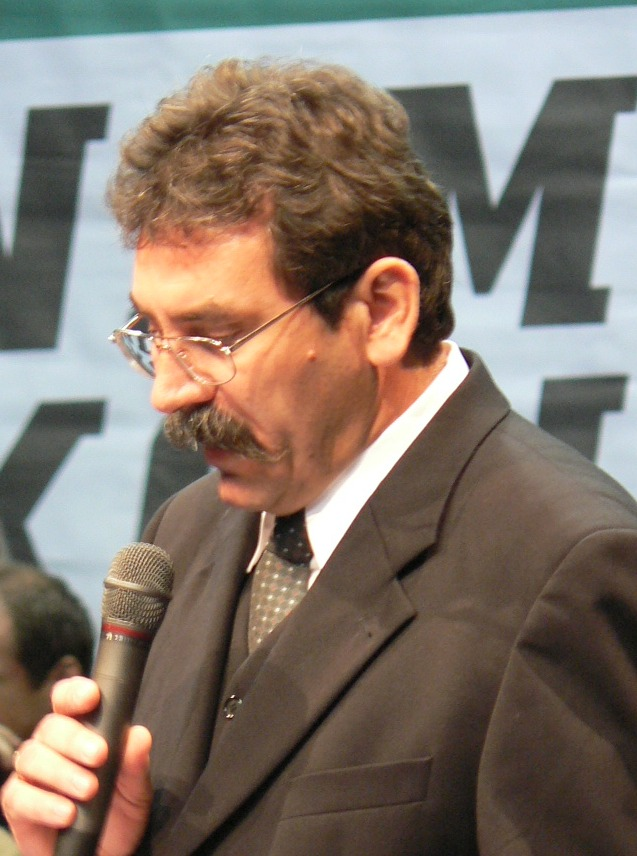

Mayor of Püspökladány
- In office 1 October 2006 – 16 March 2011

Personal details
- Born: 22 February 1960 Püspökladány, Hungary
- Died: 16 March 2011 (aged 51) Bag, Hungary
- Party: Fidesz (conservative)
- Spouse: Judit Hatházi
- Children: Sándor; Judit; Katalin
- Education: Kossuth Lajos University
- Website: http://www.arnothsandor.hu

Sándor Arnóth (22 February 1960 – 16 March 2011) was a Hungarian politician and member of the National Assembly of Hungary between 1998 and 2006, in 2008 and from 2010 until his death. He was also (since 2006) the mayor of his home town of Püspökladány, being re-elected in 2010. He was a member of Fidesz – Hungarian Civic Union.

Arnóth died in a car accident on 16 March 2011 near the city of Bag.
