= Hosszúpályi =

Coordinates: 47°24′N 21°45′E

- Large village
- Coat of arms
- Interactive map of Hosszúpályi
- Country: Hungary
- County: Hajdú-Bihar
- District: Derecske

Area
  - Total: 69.47 km^{2} (26.82 sq mi)

Population (2015)
  - Total: 5,662
  - Density: 71.5/km^{2} (185/sq mi)
- Time zone: UTC+1 (CET)
  - Summer (DST): UTC+2 (CEST)
- Postal code: 4274
- Area code: (+36) 52

Hosszúpályi is a village in Hajdú-Bihar county, in the Northern Great Plain region of eastern Hungary.

== Geography ==
It covers an area of 69.47 km^{2} (27 sq mi) and has a population of 5662 people. Much of the population is Roma. There is an elementary school, a police station, surgery and a dentist's office here. In the past agriculture was the main sector but it has been decreasing.
