= Péter Perjés =

Hungarian singer-songwriter (born 1968)

Péter Perjés (born 7 March 1968) is a Hungarian singer-songwriter, musician, and musicals director. He was the lead singer of the Hungarian rock band August Förster Reservation (1990–1994), whose song "Mocskos órák" ("Dirty hours") from their 1st album, "Valami mást" ("Something else"), was on the top of the music chart of a Hungarian national radio station's programme called Rock Gyermekei (Children of Rock) back in 1992.

== Life and career ==
Péter Perjés was born in Debrecen, Hungary, on 7 March 1968. His mother, Irén Budai, was a librarian and his father, Zoltán Perjés, an agricultural consultant. He grew up as an only child in Konyár until the age of 12, when he moved with his family to Debrecen. Encouraged by his father, a formerly amateur sports man, Péter began practising sports at school becoming an athlete with a discrete success at a national level from 1980 until 1986 in disciplines such as high jump, triple jump, 110 m. hurdles and decathlon. At the same time, he cultivated poetry. In 1987 he joined the army. There he had the chance to direct theatre, perform poems and learn how to play guitar giving an unexpected change to his career. After the army, he attended the College of Nyíregyháza getting a Geography and Physical Education Teaching Degree in 1992.

As a singer and a songwriter he founded in 1990 the rock band August Förster Reservation with his childhood friend, Akos Moldovan. The song "Mocskos órák" ("Dirty hours") of their 1st album, "Valami mást" ("Something else"), was on the top of the music chart of a Hungarian national radio station's programme called Rock Gyermekei (Children of Rock) back in 1992. The band was nominated for the Best Performers Award in 1994. After his graduation at the Goór Nagy Mária Theatre School in Budapest he was invited to play in musicals in Hungary: Farao in "Josef and the Magic Coat" by Mandala music theater in 1991 and Kiprios and Jesus in "Star makers" at the Csokonai Theater in 1992.

After leaving the stage he turned to design and marketing and founded Leonardo Design Ltd., which during the nine years of his ownership was a leading advertisement and marketing agency. He also opened the Genius Café in Debrecen, Hungary, (owner, 2000–2002) and the Key Bar in New York, United States of America (partner, from 2002). Meanwhile, he graduated from the New York Film Academy in the United States of America and from the Script-writing School of the National Film Production Agency in Hungary, both in 2002.

The idea of his most ambitious project, the Casanova Night Musical, came in 2004 followed by nearly four years of rigorous creative art work from writing the libretto and the lyrics, through composing the music, to directing video clips and even designing the logo of the Casanova Night Musical from his family coat-of-arm. As the producer of the musical he founded Genius Production Ltd. in 2006 with the mission of spreading the idea of love through music and lifting the Casanova Night Musical to become the next musical hit of the musical genre. The Casanova Night Musical has already been performed in Europe achieving a discrete success in cities such as Budapest, Hungary (2009) and Treviso, Italy (2011). An album CD with the songs in Hungarian of the musical was produced in 2006 by Péter Perjés and the English version was released two years later in 2008, starring the famous Hungarian actress Sári Évi and the rock singer Tamás Mester. In April 2012, Péter Perjés moved to Spain, where he is actually working on the Casanova Night Musical project.

In 2009, Péter Perjés acted in a secondary role in "Staggered" by Tamer Dishek.

== August Förster Reservation ==
=== Band members ===
- Singer: Péter Perjés
- Guitar: Péter Csató
- Bass: Akos Moldovan
- Drums: Szabolcs Deak
- Keyboard: Thomas Szilagyi
- (Ex) Bass: Péter Fogarasi (dead)
- (Ex) Tumble: Speed-Zilahi Z.
- (Ex) Drums: Zoltán Zilahi – Sebes

=== Discography ===
The August Förster Reservation discography consists of one album, Valami Mást (1992).

1. Valami mást
2. Hív egy hang
3. Salvador Dalí telepatikus üzenetei (a festményein keresztül)
4. Félelem
5. Minden nap, vége valaminek
6. Gyújtsd meg a hajam!
7. Mocskos órák
8. Igaz-Hazug dal
9. Utolsó mozdulat
10. Kié lesz a trón?
11. Menned kell
