= Tiszacsege =

Town in eastern Hungary

- Town
- Flag Coat of arms

- Location of Tiszacsege in Hungary
- Coordinates: 47°42′N 21°00′E
- Country: Hungary
- County: Hajdú-Bihar
- District: Balmazújváros

Area
  - Total: 136.4 km^{2} (52.7 sq mi)

Population (2024)
  - Total: 4,234
  - Density: 31/km^{2} (80/sq mi)
- Time zone: UTC+1 (CET)
  - Summer (DST): UTC+2 (CEST)
- Postal code: 4066
- Area code: (+36) 52
- Website: www.tiszacsege.hu

Tiszacsege is a town in Hajdú-Bihar County, in the Northern Great Plain region of eastern Hungary.

== Geography ==
Tiszacsege is situated on the right bank of the Tisza River, approximately 51 km northwest of Debrecen, the county seat. The town lies near the border with Borsod-Abaúj-Zemplén County and is adjacent to the Hortobágy National Park, a UNESCO World Heritage Site. The total area of the town is 136.4 km².

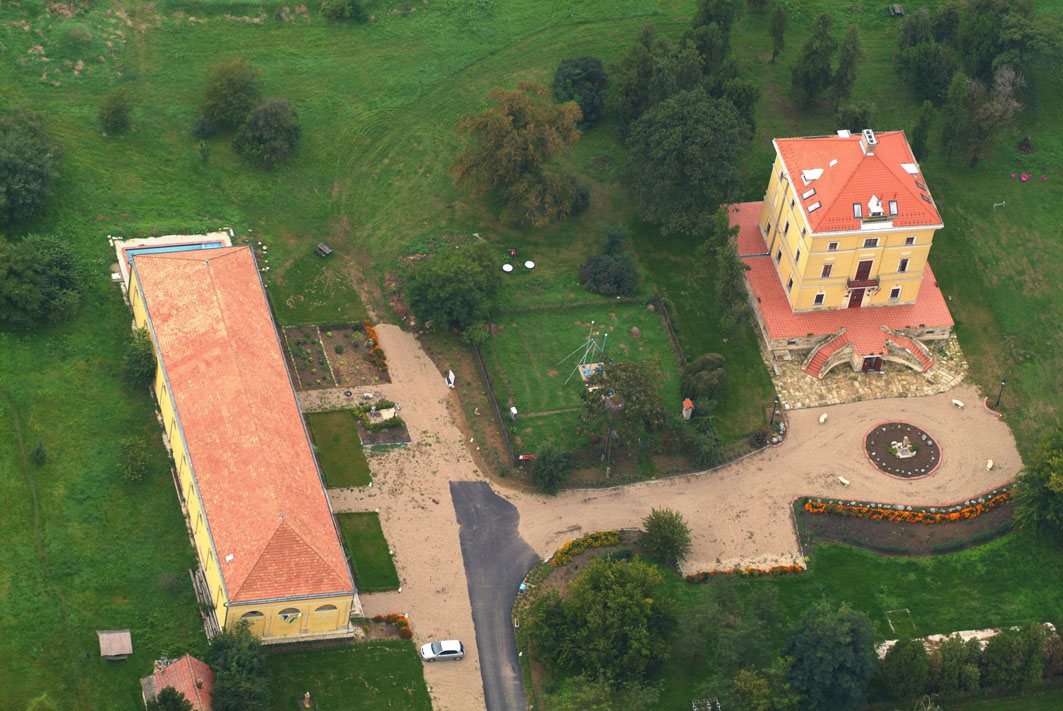
Tiszacsege - Palace from above

== History ==
The settlement was first mentioned in historical records in 1067. In 1241, during the Mongol invasion of Europe, Mongol-Tatar forces gathered in the area before the Battle of Mohi. In the 15th century, the town, then known as Csege, was granted market rights. Tiszacsege was officially designated as a town in the year 2000.

== Demographics ==
As of 1 January 2024, Tiszacsege had a population of 4,234. The population density is approximately 31.0 inhabitants per square kilometer.

== Transportation ==
Tiszacsege is accessible via regional roads numbered 3307, 3315, and 3322. While the town was previously served by the Ohat-Pusztakócs–Nyíregyháza railway line, passenger services were discontinued in December 2009. The nearest operational railway station is in Egyek. A ferry service operates across the Tisza River to Ároktő from sunrise to sunset. Additionally, the EuroVelo 11 international cycling route passes through Tiszacsege.
