= Derecske =

- Town
- Flag Coat of arms

- Location within Hungary
- Coordinates: 47.35369°N 21.57178°E
- Country: Hungary
- County: Hajdú-Bihar
- District: Derecske

Area
  - Total: 103.58 km^{2} (39.99 sq mi)

Population (2015)
  - Total: 8,734
  - Density: 84.4/km^{2} (219/sq mi)
- Time zone: UTC+1 (CET)
  - Summer (DST): UTC+2 (CEST)
- Postal code: 4130
- Area code: (+36) 54
- Website: www.derecske.hu

Derecske is a town in Hajdú-Bihar county, in the Northern Great Plain region of eastern Hungary.

== History ==
The town was first mentioned in 1291.

== Geography ==
It covers an area of 103.58 km^{2} (40 sq mi) and has a population of 8734 people (2015).
