= Újszentmargita =

- Coat of arms

- Location within Hungary
- Coordinates: 47°43′30″N 21°06′10″E
- Country: Hungary
- County: Hajdú-Bihar

Government
  - Mayor: Csetneki Csaba (Ind.)

Area
  - Total: 96.22 km^{2} (37.15 sq mi)

Population (2022)
  - Total: 1,314
  - Density: 13.66/km^{2} (35.37/sq mi)
- Time zone: UTC+1 (CET)
  - Summer (DST): UTC+2 (CEST)
- Postal code: 4065
- Area code: 52

Újszentmargita (Hungarian pronunciation: [ˈuːjsɛntmɒrɡitɒ]) is a village in Hajdú-Bihar county, in the Northern Great Plain region of eastern Hungary.

== Geography ==
It covers an area of 96.22 km^{2} (37 sq mi) and has a population of 1,314 people (2022).
