= Nádudvar =

- Town
- Flag Coat of arms

- Location within Hungary
- Coordinates: 47°25′N 21°10′E
- Country: Hungary
- County: Hajdú-Bihar
- District: Hajdúszoboszló

Area
  - Total: 294.99 km^{2} (113.90 sq mi)

Population (2019)
  - Total: 8,472
  - Density: 28.72/km^{2} (74.38/sq mi)
- Time zone: UTC+1 (CET)
  - Summer (DST): UTC+2 (CEST)
- Postal code: 4181
- Area code: (+36) 54
- Website: www.nadudvar.hu

Nádudvar is a town in Hajdú-Bihar county, in the Northern Great Plain region of eastern Hungary.

== Geography ==
It covers an area of 294.99 km^{2} (114 sq mi) and has a population of 11,472 people (2019).

== Twin towns – sister cities ==
Nádudvar is twinned with:

- Urzędów, Poland (2000)
- Sălard, Romania (2007)
