= Kaba, Hungary =

Kaba
- Town
- Flag Seal

- Location within Hungary
- Coordinates: 47°21′3″N 21°17′3″E
- Country: Hungary
- County: Hajdú-Bihar
- District: Püspökladány

Area
  - Total: 95.03 km^{2} (36.69 sq mi)

Population (2015)
  - Total: 5,878
  - Density: 61.85/km^{2} (160.2/sq mi)
- Time zone: UTC+1 (CET)
  - Summer (DST): UTC+2 (CEST)
- Postal code: 4183
- Area code: (+36) 54
- Website: www.kaba.hu

Kaba (/ˈkɑːbɑː/) is a town in eastern Hungary, in the county of Hajdú-Bihar. The town is located along the Hungarian Route 4, approximately 190 km from Budapest, the capital city and 32 km west from Debrecen, the county seat.

A 3 kg (7 lb) meteorite landed near Kaba in 1857.

== International relations ==
=== Twin towns – sister cities ===
Kaba is twinned with:

- Aleșd, Romania
- Cetariu, Romania
