= Egyek =

- Large village
- Coat of arms

- Location within Hungary
- Coordinates: 47°38′N 20°54′E
- Country: Hungary
- County: Hajdú-Bihar
- District: Balmazújváros

Area
  - Total: 104.79 km^{2} (40.46 sq mi)

Population (2001)
  - Total: 5,527
  - Density: 52.76/km^{2} (136.6/sq mi)
- Time zone: UTC+1 (CET)
  - Summer (DST): UTC+2 (CEST)
- Postal code: 4069
- Area code: (+36) 52

Egyek is a large village in Hajdú-Bihar county, in the Northern Great Plain region of eastern Hungary. Olympian László Mucza was born here.

Before World War II, there was a Jewish community. At its height, there were 123 Jews in the community. Most of them were murdered by the Nazis in the Holocaust.

== Geography ==
It covers an area of 104.79 km^{2} (40 sq mi) and has a population of 5,527 people (2001).

== International relations ==
=== Twin towns — Sister cities ===
Egyek is twinned with:

- Radzyń Podlaski, Poland
