= Hajdúszovát =

Coordinates: 47°23′N 21°29′E

- Coat of arms
- Interactive map of Hajdúszovát
- Country: Hungary
- County: Hajdú-Bihar

Area
  - Total: 58.01 km^{2} (22.40 sq mi)

Population (2015)
  - Total: 3,045
  - Density: 52.5/km^{2} (136/sq mi)
- Time zone: UTC+1 (CET)
  - Summer (DST): UTC+2 (CEST)
- Postal code: 4212
- Area code: 52

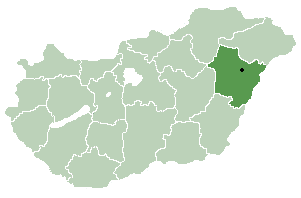
Location of Hajdú-Bihar county in Hungary

Hajdúszovát is a village in Hajdú-Bihar county, in the Northern Great Plain region of eastern Hungary.

== Geography ==
It covers an area of 58.01 km^{2} (22 sq mi) and has a population of 3045 people (2015).
