= Sárrétudvari =

Coordinates: 47°14′N 21°12′E

- Large village
- Coat of arms
- Interactive map of Sárrétudvari
- Country: Hungary
- County: Hajdú-Bihar
- District: Püspökladány

Area
  - Total: 54.42 km^{2} (21.01 sq mi)

Population (2015)
  - Total: 2,963
  - Density: 54.5/km^{2} (141/sq mi)
- Time zone: UTC+1 (CET)
  - Summer (DST): UTC+2 (CEST)
- Postal code: 4171
- Area code: (+36) 54

Sárrétudvari is a village in Hajdú-Bihar county, in the Northern Great Plain region of eastern Hungary.

== Geography ==
It covers an area of 54.42 km^{2} (21 sq mi) and has a population of 2963 people (2015).
