= Báránd =

Coordinates: 47°18′N 21°14′E

- Interactive map of Báránd
- Country: Hungary
- County: Hajdú-Bihar

Area
  - Total: 42.56 km^{2} (16.43 sq mi)

Population (2015)
  - Total: 2,631
  - Density: 61.8/km^{2} (160/sq mi)
- Time zone: UTC+1 (CET)
  - Summer (DST): UTC+2 (CEST)
- Postal code: 4161
- Area code: 54

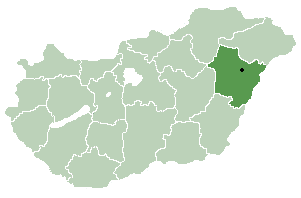
Location of Hajdú-Bihar county in Hungary

Báránd is a village in Hajdú-Bihar county, in the Northern Great Plain region of eastern Hungary.

== Geography ==
It covers an area of 42.56 km^{2} (16 sq mi) and has a population of 2631 people (2015).
