= Szerep =

Coordinates: 47°14′N 21°09′E

- Interactive map of Szerep
- Country: Hungary
- County: Hajdú-Bihar

Area
  - Total: 56.04 km^{2} (21.64 sq mi)

Population (2015)
  - Total: 1,596
  - Density: 28.5/km^{2} (74/sq mi)
- Time zone: UTC+1 (CET)
  - Summer (DST): UTC+2 (CEST)
- Postal code: 4163
- Area code: 54

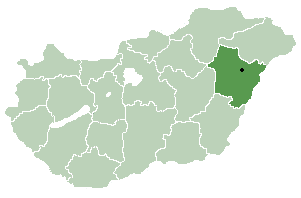
Location of Hajdú-Bihar county in Hungary

Szerep is a village in Hajdú-Bihar county, in the Northern Great Plain region of eastern Hungary.

== Geography ==
It covers an area of 56.04 km^{2} (22 sq mi) and has a population of 1,596 people (2015).
