= Hajdúszoboszló =

- Town
- Flag Coat of arms
- Nicknames: "The sunniest city in Hungary" and "Mecca for rheumatism"
- Location within Hungary
- Coordinates: 47°26′37″N 21°23′22″E
- Country: Hungary
- County: Hajdú-Bihar
- District: Hajdúszoboszló

Government
  - Mayor: Gyula Czeglédi

Area
  - Total: 238.7 km^{2} (92.2 sq mi)

Population (2017)
  - Total: 23,781
  - Density: 99.63/km^{2} (258.0/sq mi)
- Time zone: UTC1 (CET)
  - Summer (DST): UTC+2 (CEST)
- Postal code: 4200
- Area code: (+36) 52
- Website: hajduszoboszlo.hu

Hajdúszoboszló (Hungarian pronunciation: [ˈhɒjduːsobosloː]) is a town in Hajdú-Bihar county, Hungary, 19 kilometres (12 miles) southwest of county seat Debrecen. It is the third largest town in Hajdú-Bihar county.

== Etymology ==
It was formerly known as Szoboszló, with added prefix Hajdú from Hajduk. The name comes from a Slavic personal name Soběslav (see e.g. Soběslav, Soběslavice, Sebeslavce).

== Location ==
The town is located in the northeastern part of the Great Hungarian Plain. Three regions meet near the town: the Hajdúhát ridge to the north-north-east, the Hortobágy National Park (Puszta) to the north-north-west, and the Great Sárrét and Berettyó region to the south. Szoboszló lies at an altitude of scarcely 100 to 110 metres (328–361 ft) above sea level and slopes slightly towards Hortobágy.

The landscape is primarily plains, known as puszta, or "the glorious plain." There are also mountainous regions nearby. The Tisza River flows nearby the region.

== History ==
From historical data and archaeological finds, this part of the Great Plain was inhabited as far back as the Great Migrations. Because of the natural resources and the convergence of trade routes, Huns, Vandals, Gepids, Goths, and Avars frequently alternated with one another in this area. Early in the reign of the Árpád Dynasty, the area was inhabited by populous communities. The first written mention of Szoboszló dates back to 1075, when King Géza I donated half of Szoboszló's royal duty taxes to the new abbacy to be established at Garamszentbenedek.

With an ornate deed of gift dated 2 September 1606, István Bocskai, Prince of Transylvania, provided smallholdings for 700 Hajdú (Heyduck) cavalrymen at the site of Szoboszló, which had been destroyed by the Crimean Tatars. Henceforth the prefix Hajdú was attached to the settlement's previous Slavonic name, though the compound form - Hajdúszoboszló - only became widespread in the 19th century. The town led the customary, toilsome life of the small agricultural, stock-breeding towns of Hajdú County until well into the 20th century.

An upswing began on 26 October 1925 with the discovery of the thermal spring in the course of drilling for oil and gas. The medicinal water, tinged with natural iodine, led to the town's development into a resort spa, while agriculture retained its significant role even after the discovery of the gas field.

== Population ==
- 1870 - 12,269
- 1920 - 17,722
- 1970 - 22,000
- 2002 - 23,874
- 2005 - 23,827
- 2009 - 23,295
- 2019 - 24,185

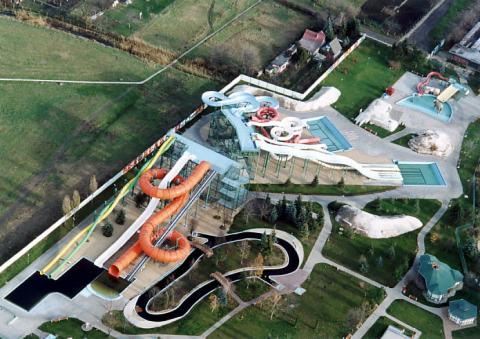
Aerial photo of the strand (aquapark)

== Spa complex ==
The water park includes water slides, an olympic-sized swimming pool, and a wave pool, while the spa features graded thermal pools, including a tepidarium and jacuzzi-type hot baths.

== Sport ==
In the city Hajdúszoboszlói SE football team has been operating since its founding in 1912, usually playing in the third division and fourth division.

== Twin towns – sister cities ==
Hajdúszoboszló is twinned with:

- Bad Dürrheim, Germany
- Dzierżoniów, Poland
- Kežmarok, Slovakia
- Lanškroun, Czech Republic
- Târnăveni, Romania
