= Ebes =

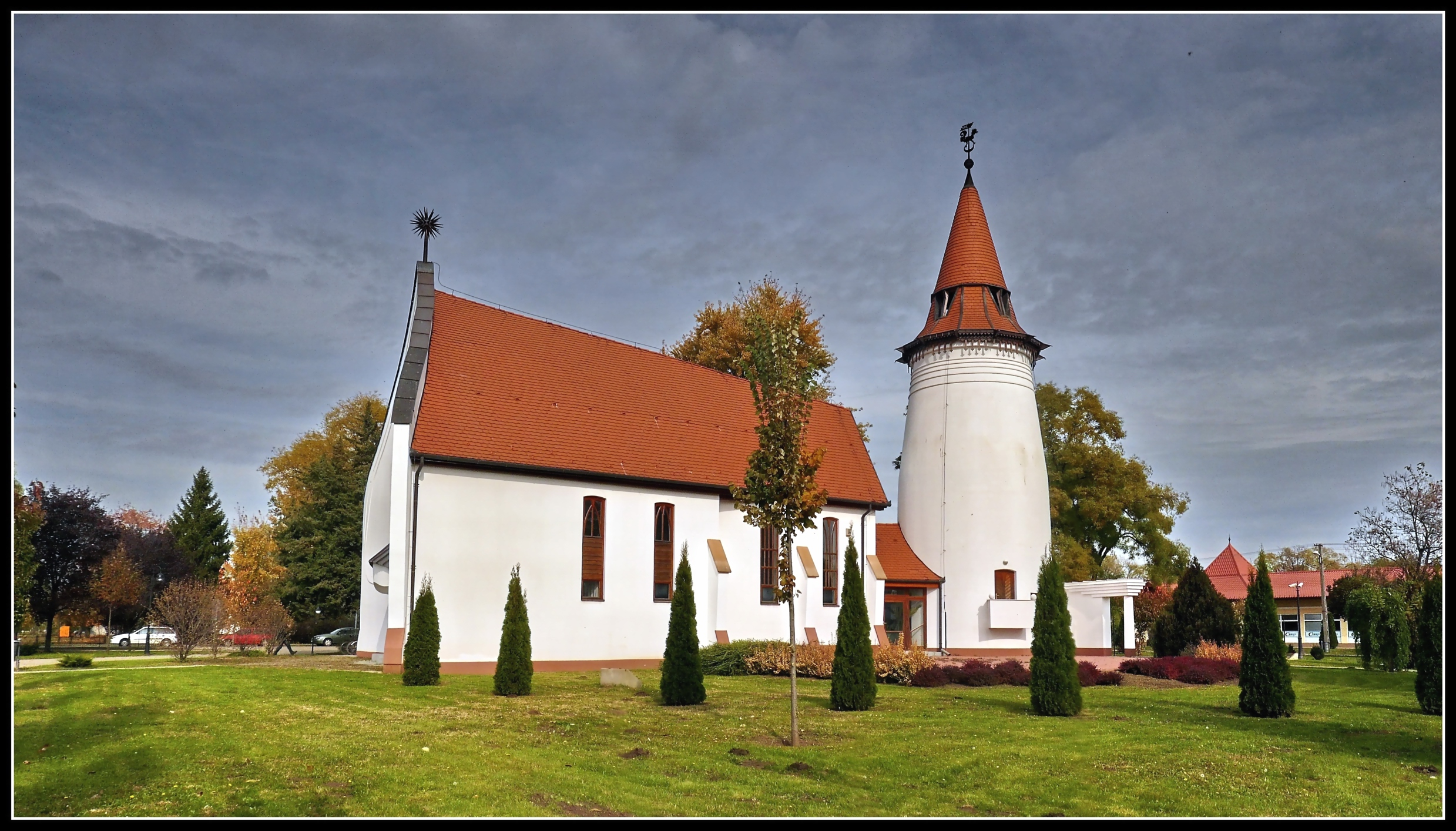
- Calvinist Church of Ebes

- Flag Coat of arms

- Location of Ebes
- Coordinates: 47°28′N 21°30′E
- Country: Hungary
- County: Hajdú-Bihar

Area
  - Total: 77.27 km^{2} (29.83 sq mi)

Population (2015)
  - Total: 4,388
  - Density: 56.8/km^{2} (147/sq mi)
- Time zone: UTC+1 (CET)
  - Summer (DST): UTC+2 (CEST)
- Postal code: 4211
- Area code: 52
- Website: http://www.ebes.hu/

Ebes is a village in Hajdú-Bihar county, in the Northern Great Plain region of eastern Hungary.

== Geography ==
It covers an area of 77.27 square kilometres (29.83 sq mi) and has a population of 4388 people (2015).

== International relations ==
=== Twin towns – Sister cities ===
Ebes is twinned with Meilen, Switzerland
