= Nagyhegyes =

Coordinates: 47°31′N 21°25′E

- Coat of arms
- Interactive map of Nagyhegyes
- Country: Hungary
- County: Hajdú-Bihar

Area
  - Total: 132.76 km^{2} (51.26 sq mi)

Population (2015)
  - Total: 2,714
  - Density: 20.4/km^{2} (53/sq mi)
- Time zone: UTC+1 (CET)
  - Summer (DST): UTC+2 (CEST)
- Postal code: 4064
- Area code: 52

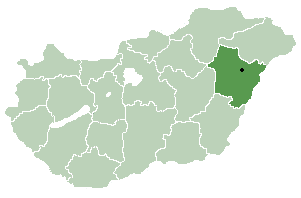
Location of Hajdú-Bihar county in Hungary

Nagyhegyes is a village in Hajdú-Bihar county, in the Northern Great Plain region of eastern Hungary.

== Geography ==
It covers an area of 132.76 km^{2} (51 sq mi) and has a population of 2714 people (2015).
