= Konyár =

Coordinates: 47°19′N 21°40′E

- Coat of arms
- Interactive map of Konyár
- Country: Hungary
- County: Hajdú-Bihar

Area
  - Total: 41.70 km^{2} (16.10 sq mi)

Population (2015)
  - Total: 2,183
  - Density: 52.4/km^{2} (136/sq mi)
- Time zone: UTC+1 (CET)
  - Summer (DST): UTC+2 (CEST)
- Postal code: 4133
- Area code: 54

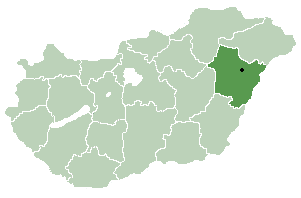
Location of Hajdú-Bihar county in Hungary

Konyár is a village in Hajdú-Bihar county, in the Northern Great Plain region of eastern Hungary.

== Etymology ==
The names comes from the Slavic koňar/koniar (a stableman or a horsekeeper). 1213/1150 Kanar.

== Geography ==
It covers an area of 41.70 km^{2} (16 sq mi) and has a population of 2183 people (2015).

== Notable residents ==
- Péter Perjés (born 1968), singer-songwriter, musician, and musicals director
- Alfred Tibor (1920 – 2017), sculptor
