= Tetétlen =

Coordinates: 47°18′58″N 21°18′19″E

- Coat of arms
- Interactive map of Tetétlen
- Country: Hungary
- County: Hajdú-Bihar

Area
  - Total: 32.11 km^{2} (12.40 sq mi)

Population (2025)
  - Total: 1,231
- Time zone: UTC+1 (CET)
  - Summer (DST): UTC+2 (CEST)
- Postal code: 4184
- Area code: 54

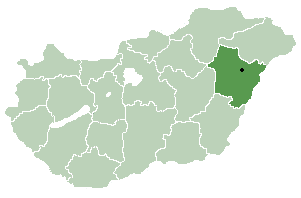
Location of Hajdú-Bihar county in Hungary

Tetétlen is a village in Hajdú-Bihar county, in the Northern Great Plain region of eastern Hungary.

== Geography ==
It covers an area of 32.11 km^{2} (12 sq mi) and has a population of 1455 people (2001).
