= Püspökladány =

- Town
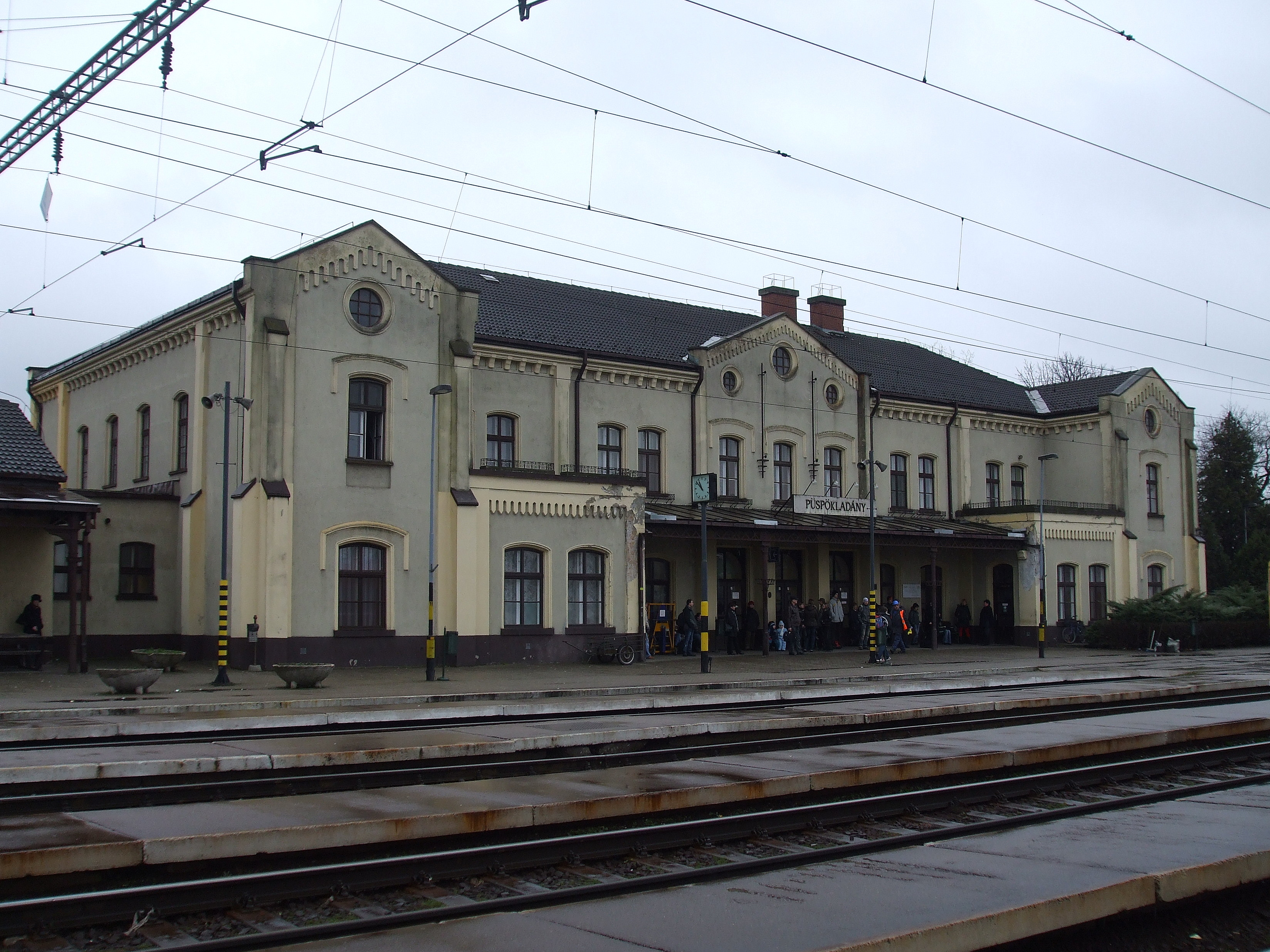

- Flag Coat of arms

- Location within Hungary
- Coordinates: 47°19′N 21°7′E
- Country: Hungary
- County: Hajdú-Bihar
- District: Püspökladány

Area
  - Total: 186.95 km^{2} (72.18 sq mi)

Population (2001)
  - Total: 16,126
  - Density: 85.79/km^{2} (222.2/sq mi)
- Time zone: UTC+1 (CET)
  - Summer (DST): UTC+2 (CEST)
- Postal code: 4150
- Area code: (+36) 54

Püspökladány (pronounced [ˈpyʃpøklɒdaːɲ]) is the sixth largest town of Hajdú-Bihar county in North Eastern Hungary with a population of approximately 16,000 people. It is located southwest of Debrecen at the juncture of three regions: Sárrét, Hortobágy and Nagykunság. It is an important transportation hub at the junction of national highway 4 from Budapest to Záhony, and national highway No. 42 from Romania to Biharkeresztes. The town is served by four different rail lines.

== Twin towns – sister cities ==
Püspökladány is twinned with:

- Fischamend, Austria
- Ghindari, Romania
- Hämeenlinna, Finland
- Hattem, Netherlands
- Krasnystaw, Poland
