= Nagykálló District =

Coordinates: 47.7833°N 21.8333°E

Nagykálló District Nagykállói járás
- Districts of Hungary
- Coat of arms

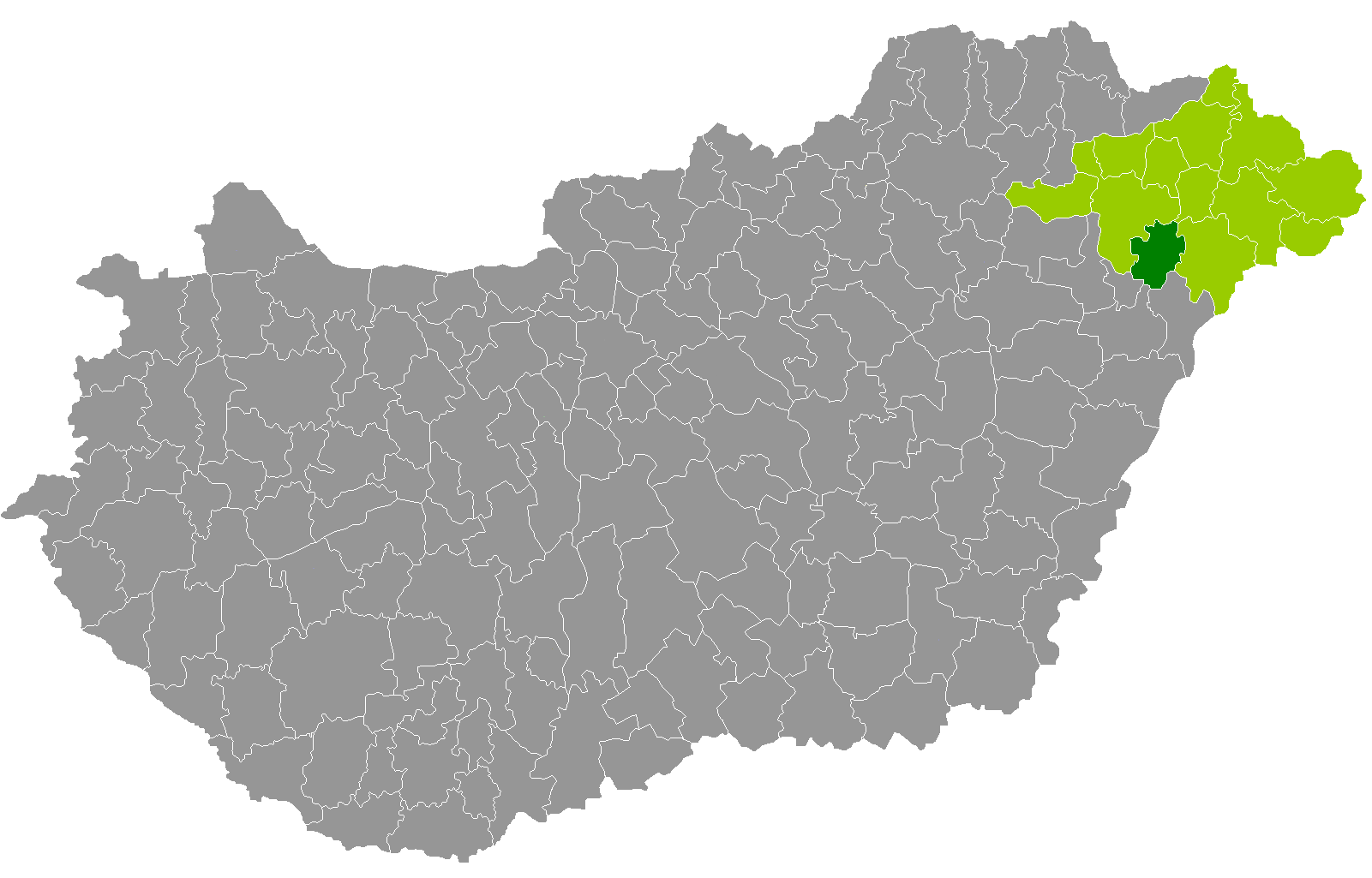
- Nagykálló District within Hungary and Szabolcs-Szatmár-Bereg County.
- Country: Hungary
- County: Szabolcs-Szatmár-Bereg
- District seat: Nagykálló

Area
  - Total: 377.36 km^{2} (145.70 sq mi)
  - Rank: 8th in Szabolcs-Szatmár-Bereg

Population (2011 census)
  - Total: 30,403
  - Rank: 7th in Szabolcs-Szatmár-Bereg
  - Density: 81/km^{2} (210/sq mi)

Nagykálló (Hungarian: Nagykállói járás) is a district in southern part of Szabolcs-Szatmár-Bereg County. Nagykálló is also the name of the town where the district seat is found. The district is located in the Northern Great Plain Statistical Region. This district is a part of Nyírség geographical region.

== Geography ==
Nagykálló District borders with Baktalórántháza District to the northeast, Nyírbátor District and Nyíradony District (Hajdú-Bihar County) to the east, Debrecen District and Hajdúhadház District (Hajdú-Bihar County) to the south, Nyíregyháza District to the west and north. The number of the inhabited places in Nagykálló District is 8.

== Municipalities ==
The district has 2 towns, 1 large village and 5 villages. (ordered by population, as of 1 January 2013)

- **Balkány** (6,468)
- Biri (1,424)
- Bököny (3,221)
- Érpatak (1,692)
- Geszteréd (1,761)
- Kállósemjén (3,600)
- **Nagykálló** (9,469) – district seat
- Szakoly (2,795)

The bolded municipalities are cities, italics municipality is large village.

== Demographics ==
Religion in Nagykálló District (2011 census)
1. Catholic Church (25.5%)
2. Greek Catholicism (25.4%)
3. Calvinism (18.4%)
4. Lutheranism (0.50%)
5. Other religions (0.80%)
6. Non-religious (5.30%)
7. Atheists (0.30%)
8. Undeclared (23.8%)

In 2011, it had a population of 30,403 and the population density was 81/km².

Year	County population	Change
2011	30,403	n/a

=== Ethnicity ===
Besides the Hungarian majority, the main minorities are the Roma (approx. 1,500) and German (100).

Total population (2011 census): 30,403
Ethnic groups (2011 census): Identified themselves: 28,131 persons:

- Hungarians: 26,504 (94.22%)
- Gypsies: 1,220 (4.34%)
- Others and indefinable: 407 (1.45%)

Approx. 2,500 persons in Nagykálló District did not declare their ethnic group at the 2011 census.

=== Religion ===
Religious adherence in the county according to 2011 census:

- Catholic – 15,491 (Roman Catholic – 7,763; Greek Catholic – 7,728);
- Reformed – 5,607;
- Evangelical – 148;
- other religions – 233;
- Non-religious – 1,602;
- Atheism – 96;
- Undeclared – 7,226.

== Gallery ==
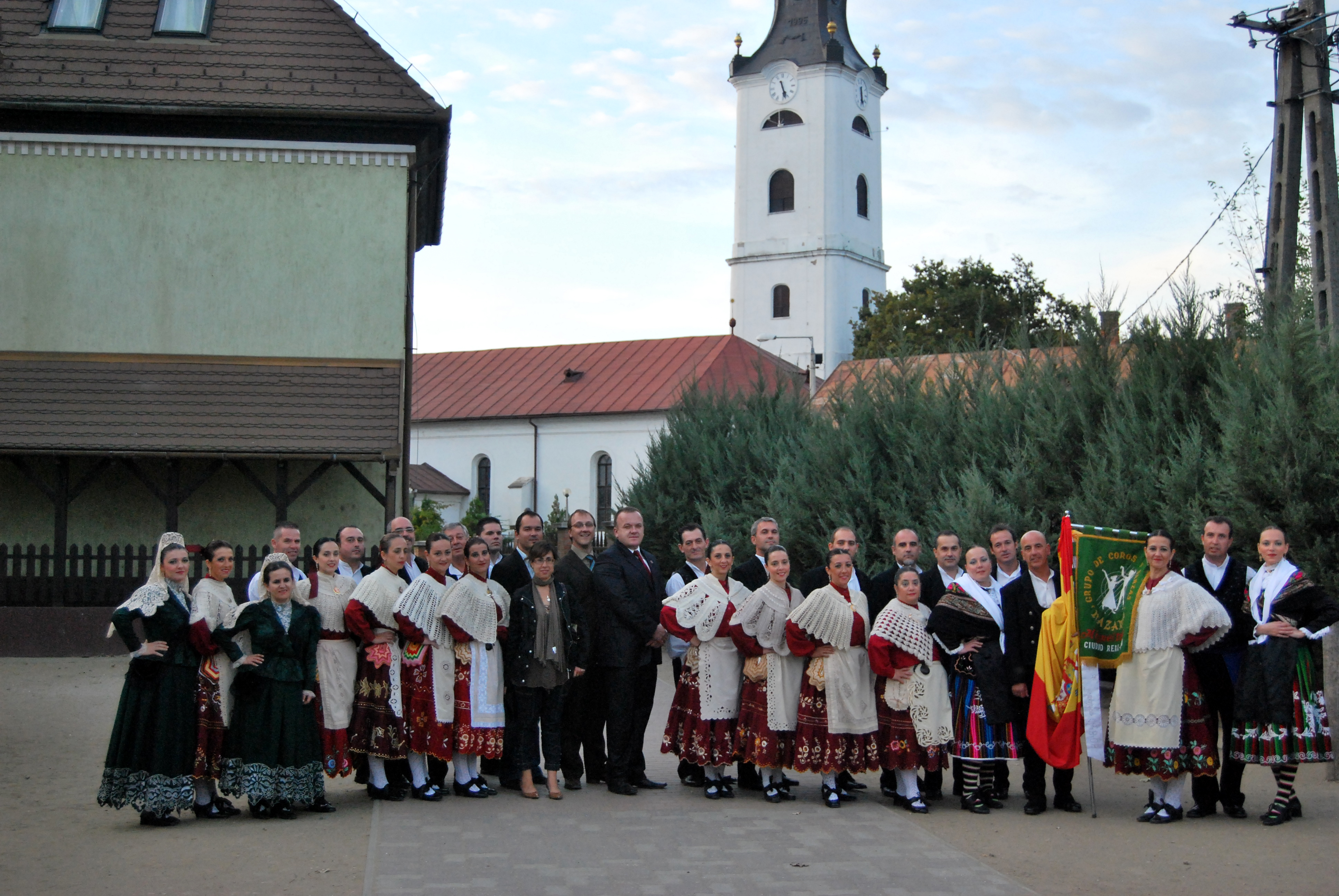
Nagykálló, the district seat

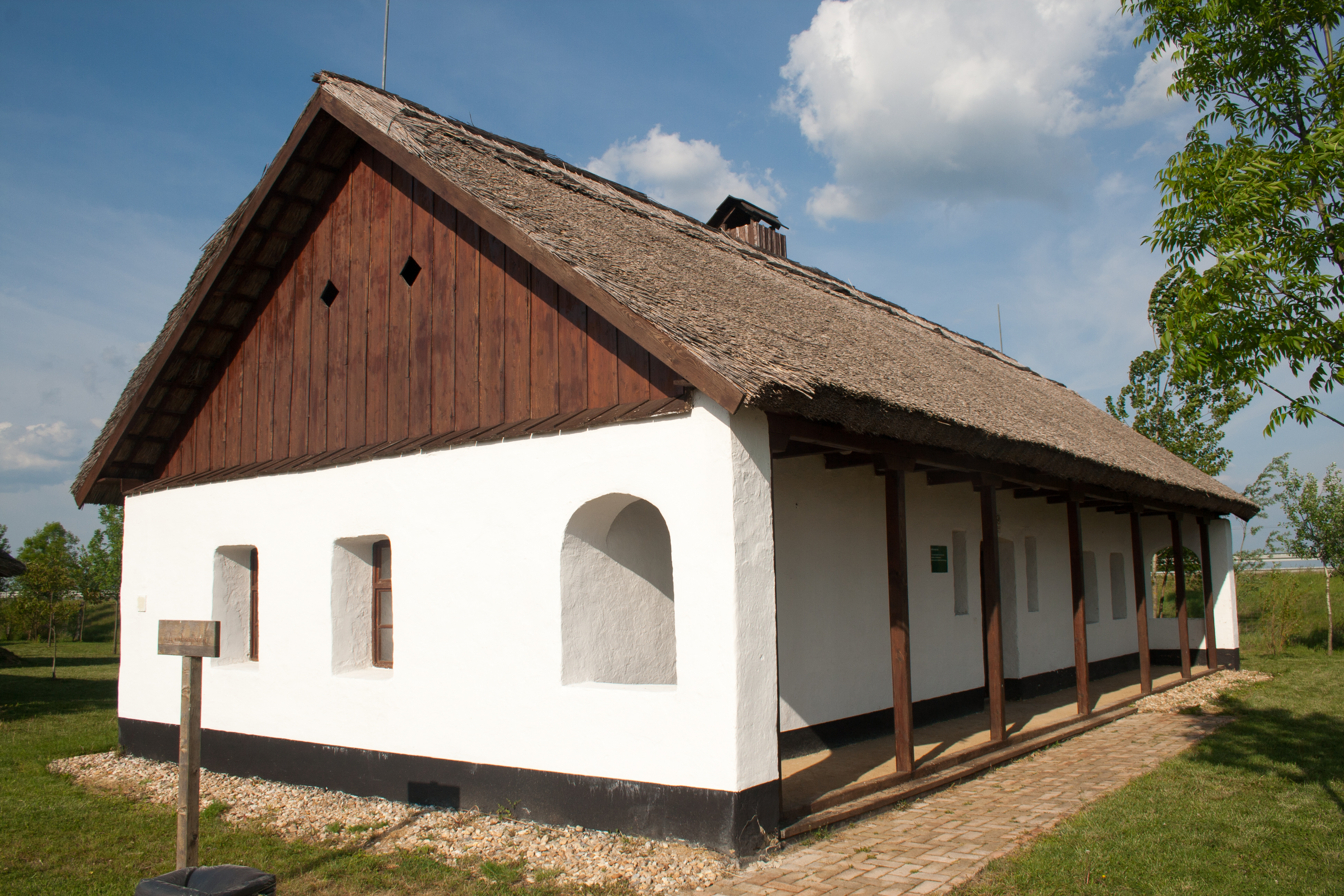
Traditional house from Kállósemjén

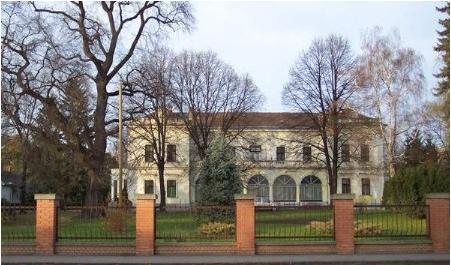
Gencsy Mansion in Balkány

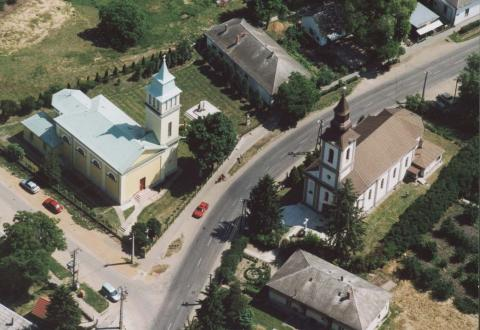
Aerial view of Kállósemjén

== See also ==
- List of cities and towns of Hungary
