= Geszteréd =

Coordinates: 47°46′N 21°47′E

- Coat of arms
- Interactive map of Geszteréd
- Country: Hungary
- County: Szabolcs-Szatmár-Bereg

Area
  - Total: 33.52 km^{2} (12.94 sq mi)

Population (2015)
  - Total: 1,718
  - Density: 51.3/km^{2} (133/sq mi)
- Time zone: UTC+1 (CET)
  - Summer (DST): UTC+2 (CEST)
- Postal code: 4232
- Area code: 42

Location of Szabolcs-Szatmar-Bereg county in Hungary

Geszteréd is a village in Szabolcs-Szatmár-Bereg county, in the Northern Great Plain region of eastern Hungary. It covers an area of 33.52 km^{2} (13 sq mi) and has a population of 1718 people (2015).

== Geography ==
The settlement is located on the edge of Nyírség area towards Hajdúság, in the south-southwestern part of Szabolcs-Szatmár-Bereg County, near the county border, between two big cities, Debrecen and Nyíregyháza. It borders Nagykálló from the north, Biri and Balkány from the east, Érpatak from the northwest, Bököny, Hajdúhadház and Hajdúsámson from the south.

There are 3 smaller homesteads attached to the village:

- Lovastanya is located 3 km from the Balkány and 1 km from Gesztered. It was owned by the Lovas family for years. It was attached to Balkány up until 1990. Population: 10 people.
- Nyíritanya is located 2 km north of Geszteréd. Population: 8 people.
- Szállásföld is 11 km from the Balkány, 3 km from the Déssy homestead and about 15 km from the Hajdúhadház. It has a population of 21 people. It has no direct route to Geszteréd.
