= Hajdúhadház District =

Hajdúhadház District Hajdúhadházi járás
- Districts of Hungary
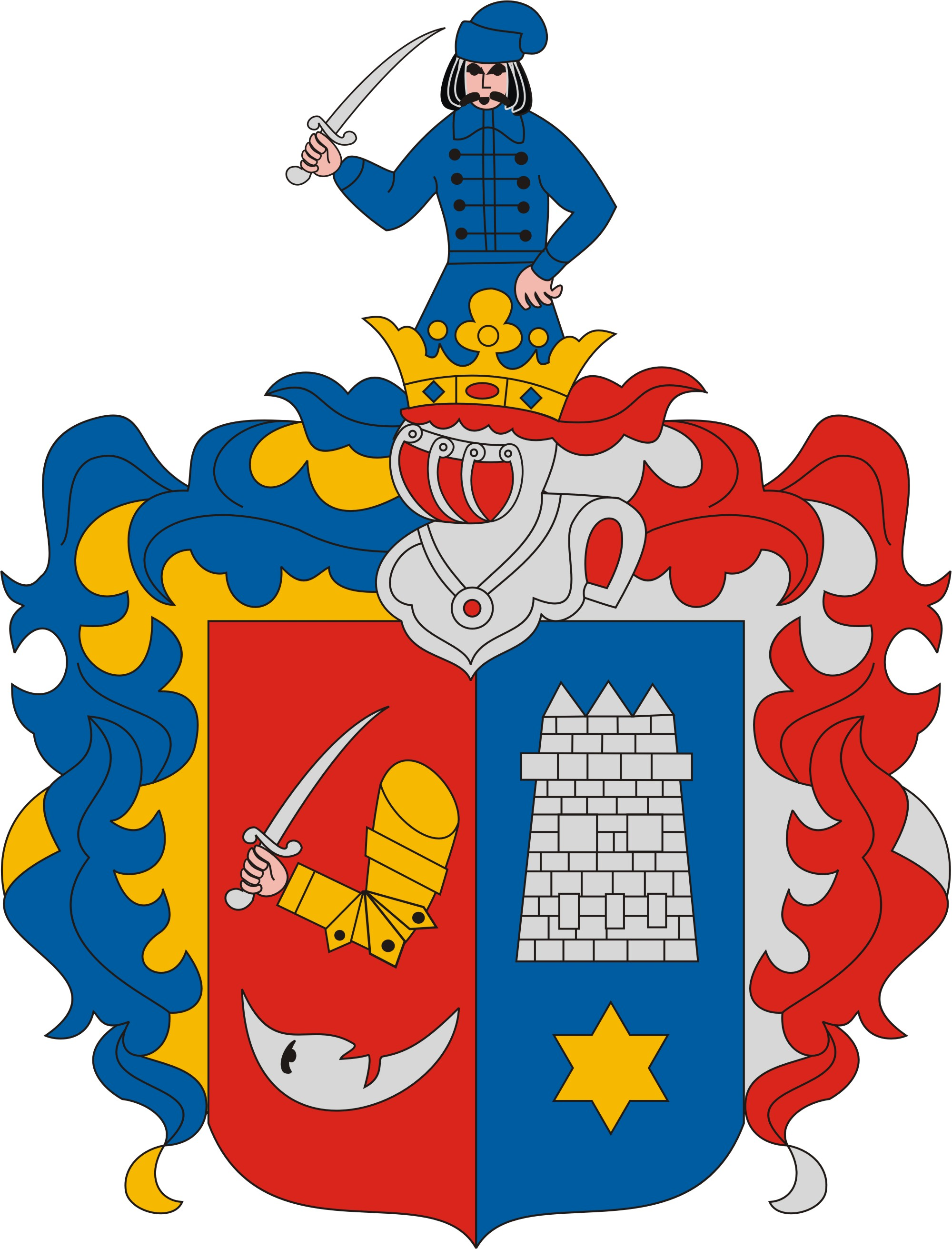
- Coat of arms

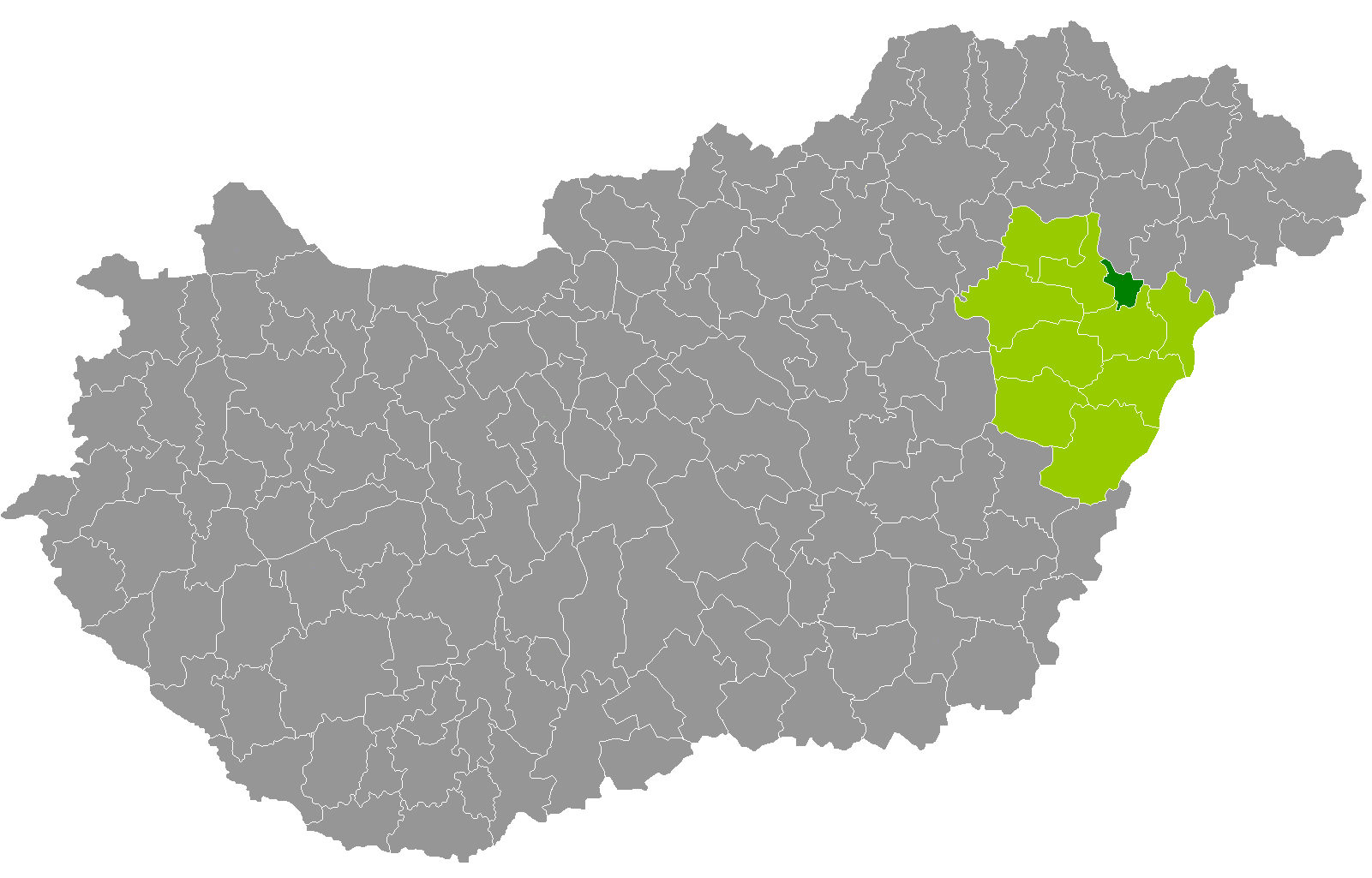
- Hajdúhadház District within Hungary and Hajdú-Bihar County.
- Coordinates: 47.68°N 21.67°E
- Country: Hungary
- County: Hajdú-Bihar
- District seat: Hajdúhadház

Area
  - Total: 137.02 km^{2} (52.90 sq mi)
  - Rank: 10th in Hajdú-Bihar

Population (2011 census)
  - Total: 22,183
  - Rank: 10th in Hajdú-Bihar
  - Density: 162/km^{2} (420/sq mi)

Hajdúhadház (Hungarian: Hajdúhadházi járás) is a district in northern part of Hajdú-Bihar County. Hajdúhadház is also the name of the town where the district seat is found. The district is located in the Northern Great Plain Statistical Region. This district is a part of Hajdúság historical and geographical region.

== Geography ==
Hajdúhadház District borders with Nyíregyháza District and Nagykálló District (Szabolcs-Szatmár-Bereg County) to the north, Debrecen District to the east and south, Hajdúböszörmény District to the west. The number of the inhabited places in Hajdúhadház District is 3.

== Municipalities ==
The district has 2 towns and 1 village. (ordered by population, as of 1 January 2012)

- Bocskaikert (2,946)
- **Hajdúhadház** (12,458) – district seat
- **Téglás** (6,637)

The bolded municipalities are cities.

== Demographics ==
Religion in Hajdúhadház District (2011 census)
1. Calvinism (31.4%)
2. Catholic Church (6.40%)
3. Greek Catholicism (4.70%)
4. Other religions (4.80%)
5. Non-religious (29.3%)
6. Atheists (0.80%)
7. Undeclared (22.6%)

In 2011, it had a population of 22,183 and the population density was 162/km^{2}.

Year	County population	Change
2011	22,183	n/a

=== Ethnicity ===
Besides the Hungarian majority, the main minority is the Roma (approx. 2,500).

Total population (2011 census): 22,183
Ethnic groups (2011 census): Identified themselves: 22,195 persons:

- Hungarians: 19,661 (88.58%)
- Gypsies: 2,280 (10.27%)
- Others and indefinable: 254 (1.14%)

Approx. 50 persons in Hajdúhadház District did declare more than one ethnic group at the 2011 census.

=== Religion ===
Religious adherence in the county according to 2011 census:

- Reformed – 6,972;
- Catholic – 2,462 (Roman Catholic – 1,413; Greek Catholic – 1,049);
- other religions – 1,061;
- Non-religious – 6,498;
- Atheism – 188;
- Undeclared – 5,002.

== Gallery ==
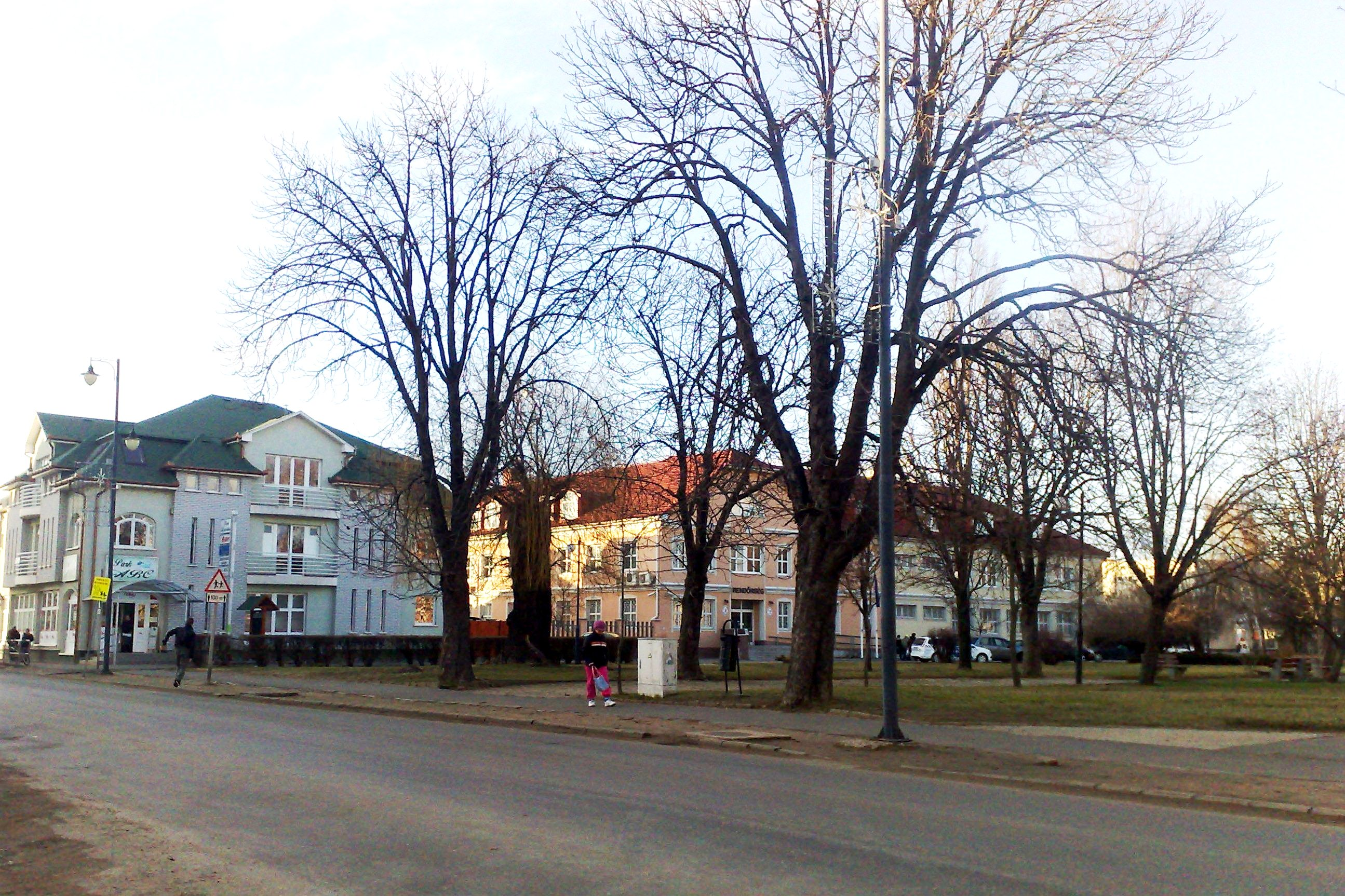
Hajdúhadház, the district seat

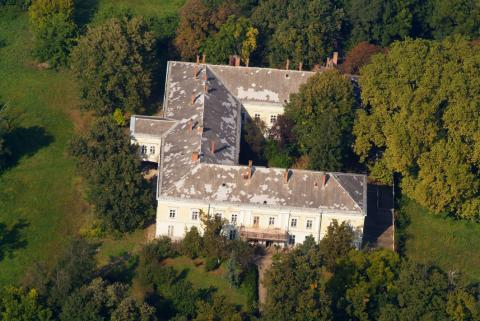
Degenfeld Mansion in Téglás

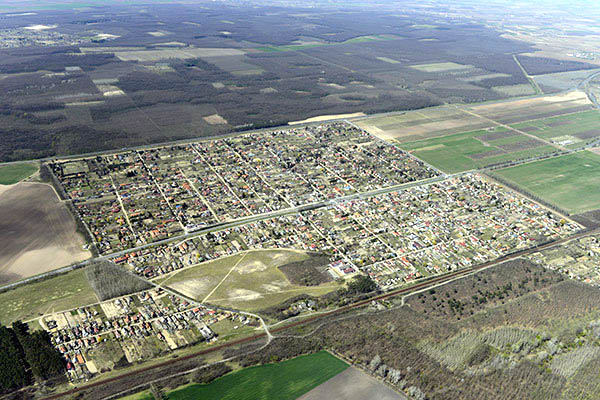
Aerial view of Bocskaikert

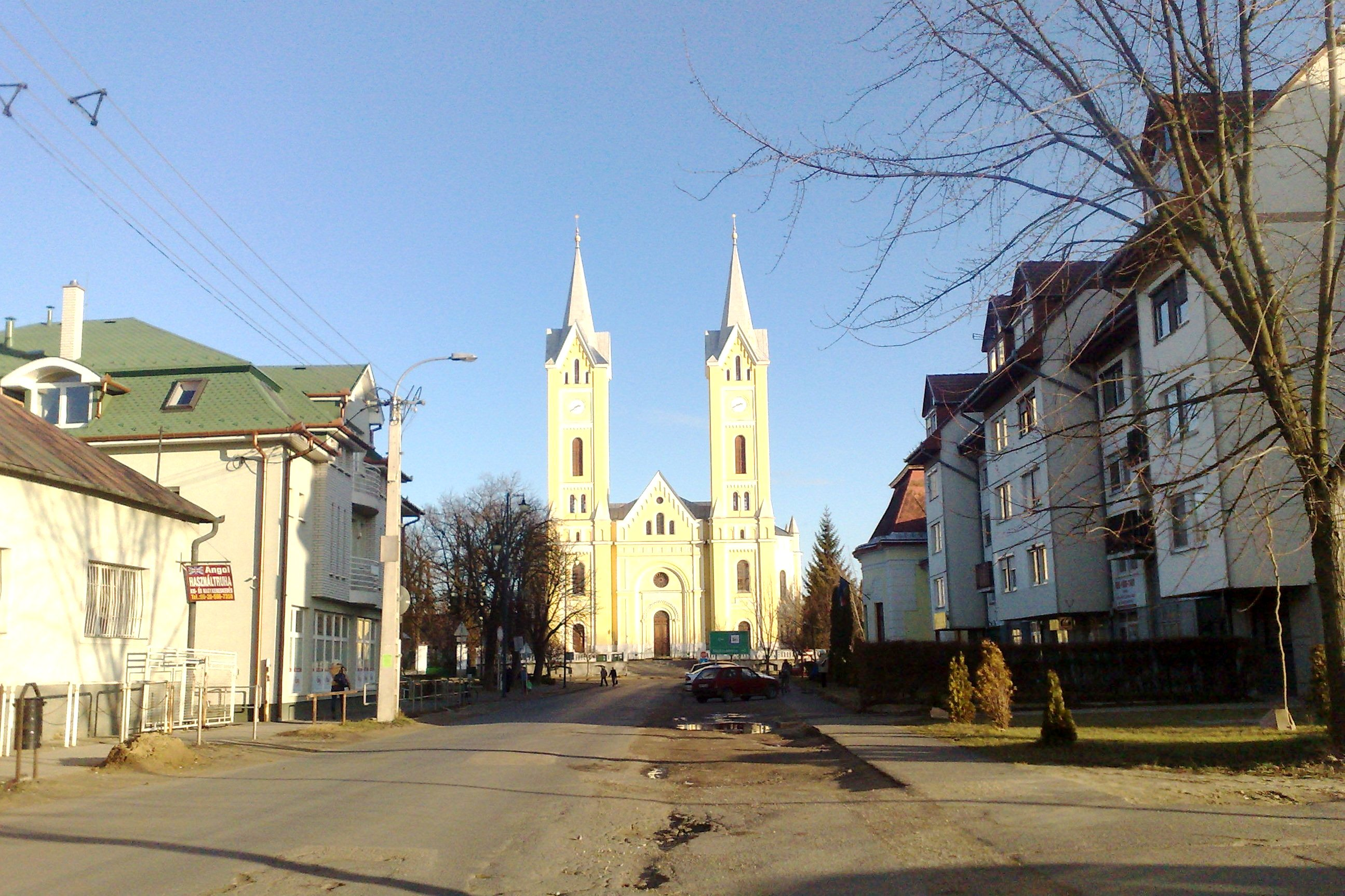
Reformed Great Church of Hajdúhadház

== See also ==
- List of cities and towns of Hungary
