= Hajdúböszörmény District =

Coordinates: 47.7667°N 21.4333°E

Hajdúböszörmény District Hajdúböszörményi járás
- Districts of Hungary
- Coat of arms

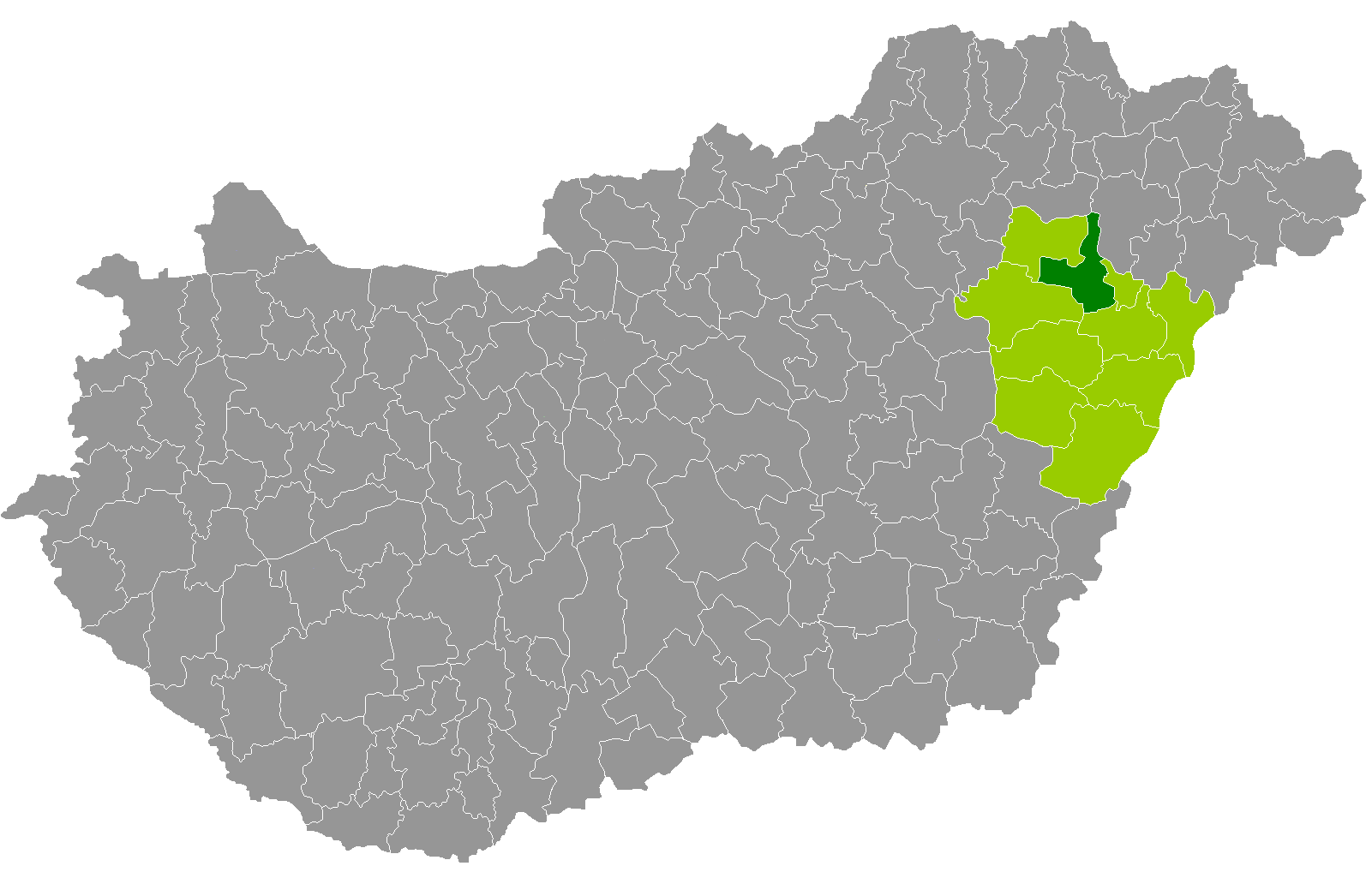
- Hajdúböszörmény District within Hungary and Hajdú-Bihar County.
- Country: Hungary
- County: Hajdú-Bihar
- District seat: Hajdúböszörmény

Area
  - Total: 471.43 km^{2} (182.02 sq mi)
  - Rank: 9th in Hajdú-Bihar

Population (2011 census)
  - Total: 40,568
  - Rank: 5th in Hajdú-Bihar
  - Density: 86/km^{2} (220/sq mi)

Hajdúböszörmény (Hungarian: Hajdúböszörményi járás) is a district in northern part of Hajdú-Bihar County. Hajdúböszörmény is also the name of the town where the district seat is found. The district is located in the Northern Great Plain Statistical Region. This district is a part of Hajdúság historical and geographical region.

== Geography ==
Hajdúböszörmény District borders with Tiszavasvári District and Nyíregyháza District (Szabolcs-Szatmár-Bereg County) to the north, Hajdúhadház District to the east, Debrecen District to the south, Balmazújváros District and Hajdúnánás District to the west. The number of the inhabited places in Hajdúböszörmény District is 2.

== Municipalities ==
The district has 2 towns. (ordered by population, as of 1 January 2012)

- **Hajdúböszörmény** (31,306) – district seat
- **Hajdúdorog** (8,888)

The bolded municipalities are cities.

== Demographics ==
Religion in Hajdúböszörmény District (2011 census)
1. Calvinism (21.7%)
2. Greek Catholicism (17.5%)
3. Catholic Church (4.20%)
4. Other religions (2.10%)
5. Non-religious (28.5%)
6. Atheists (1.10%)
7. Undeclared (24.9%)

In 2011, it had a population of 40,568 and the population density was 86/km².

Year	County population	Change
2011	40,568	n/a

=== Ethnicity ===
Besides the Hungarian majority, the main minorities are the Roma (approx. 1,000) and German (100).

Total population (2011 census): 40,568
Ethnic groups (2011 census): Identified themselves: 36,078 persons:

- Hungarians: 34,741 (96.29%)
- Gypsies: 973 (2.70%)
- Others and indefinable: 364 (1.01%)

Approx. 4,500 persons in Hajdúböszörmény District did not declare their ethnic group at the 2011 census.

=== Religion ===
Religious adherence in the county according to 2011 census:

- Reformed – 8,822;
- Catholic – 8,779 (Greek Catholic – 7,087; Roman Catholic – 1,692);
- other religions – 846;
- Non-religious – 11,548;
- Atheism – 445;
- Undeclared – 10,128.

== Gallery ==
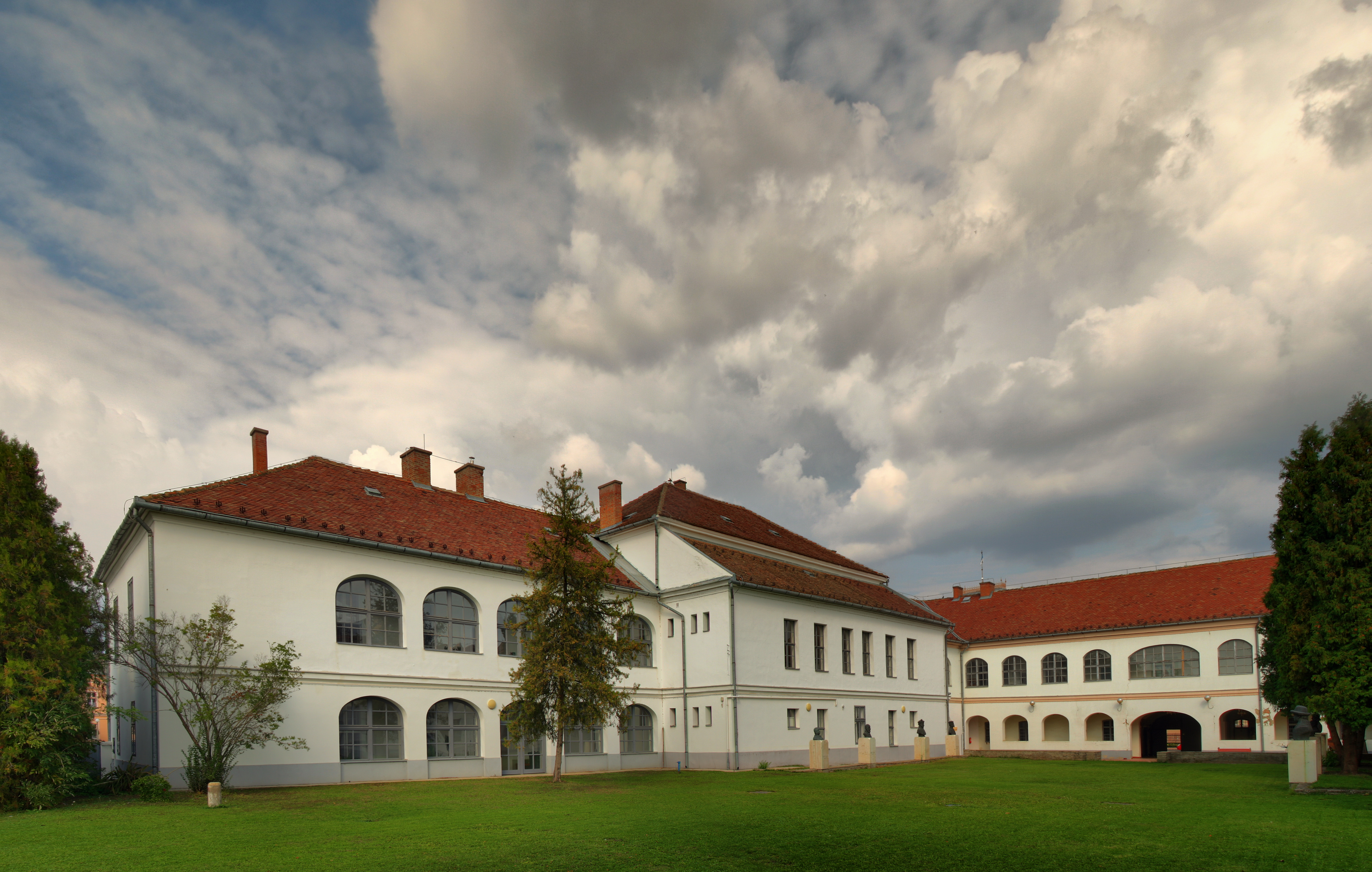
Hajdúböszörmény, the headquarters of Hajdú District

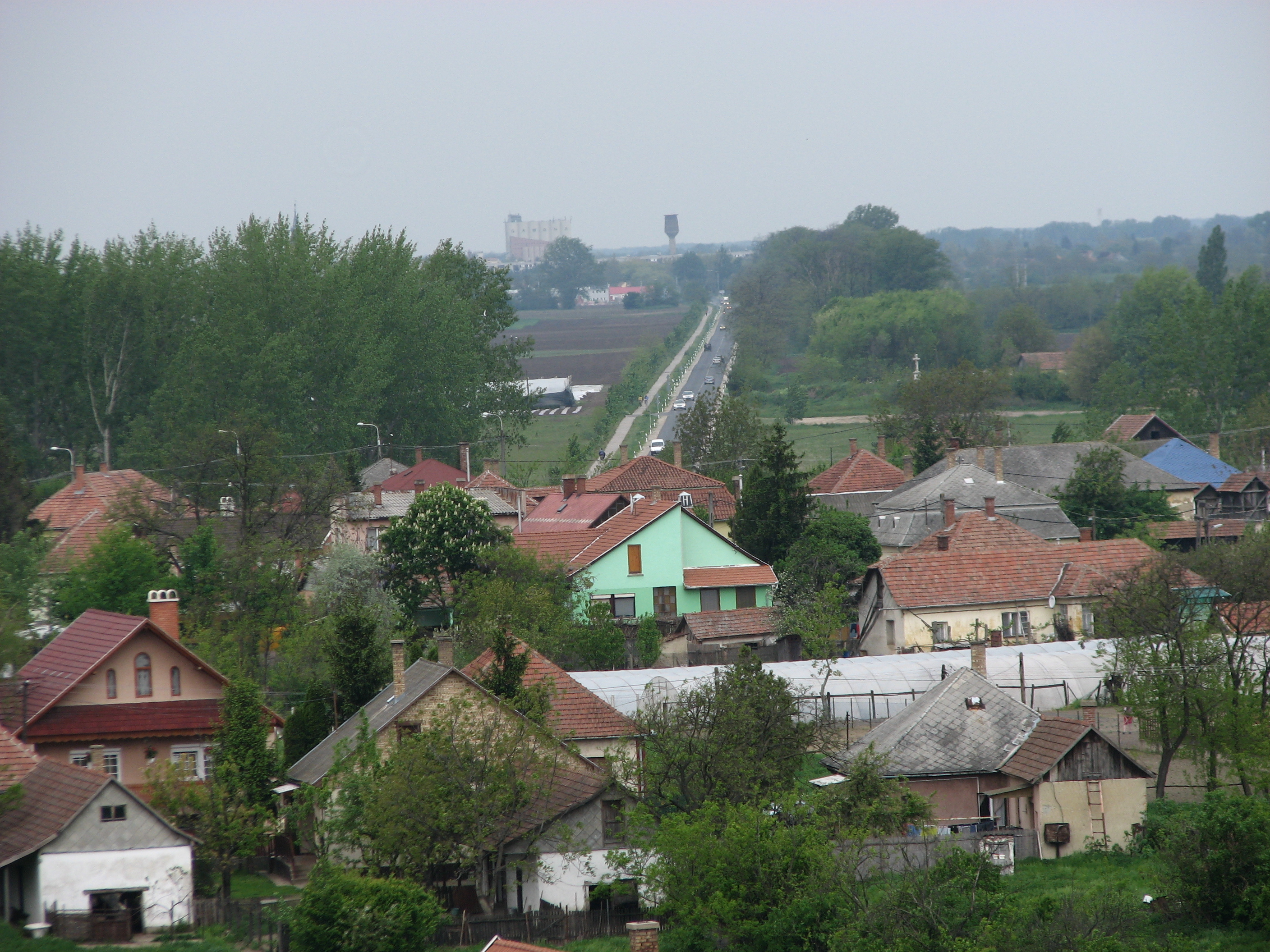
View of Hajdúdorog

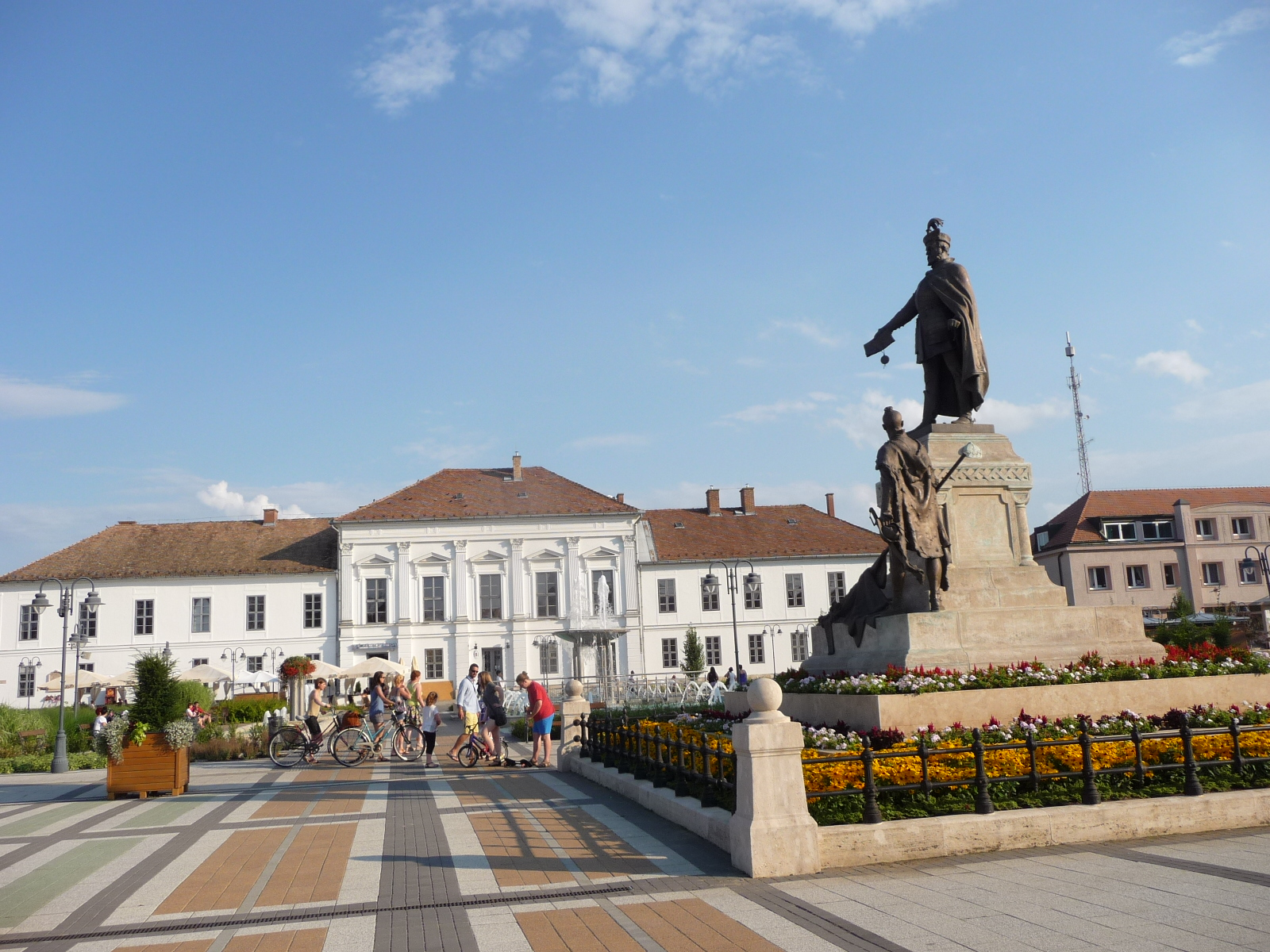
Bocskai Square (Hajdúböszörmény)

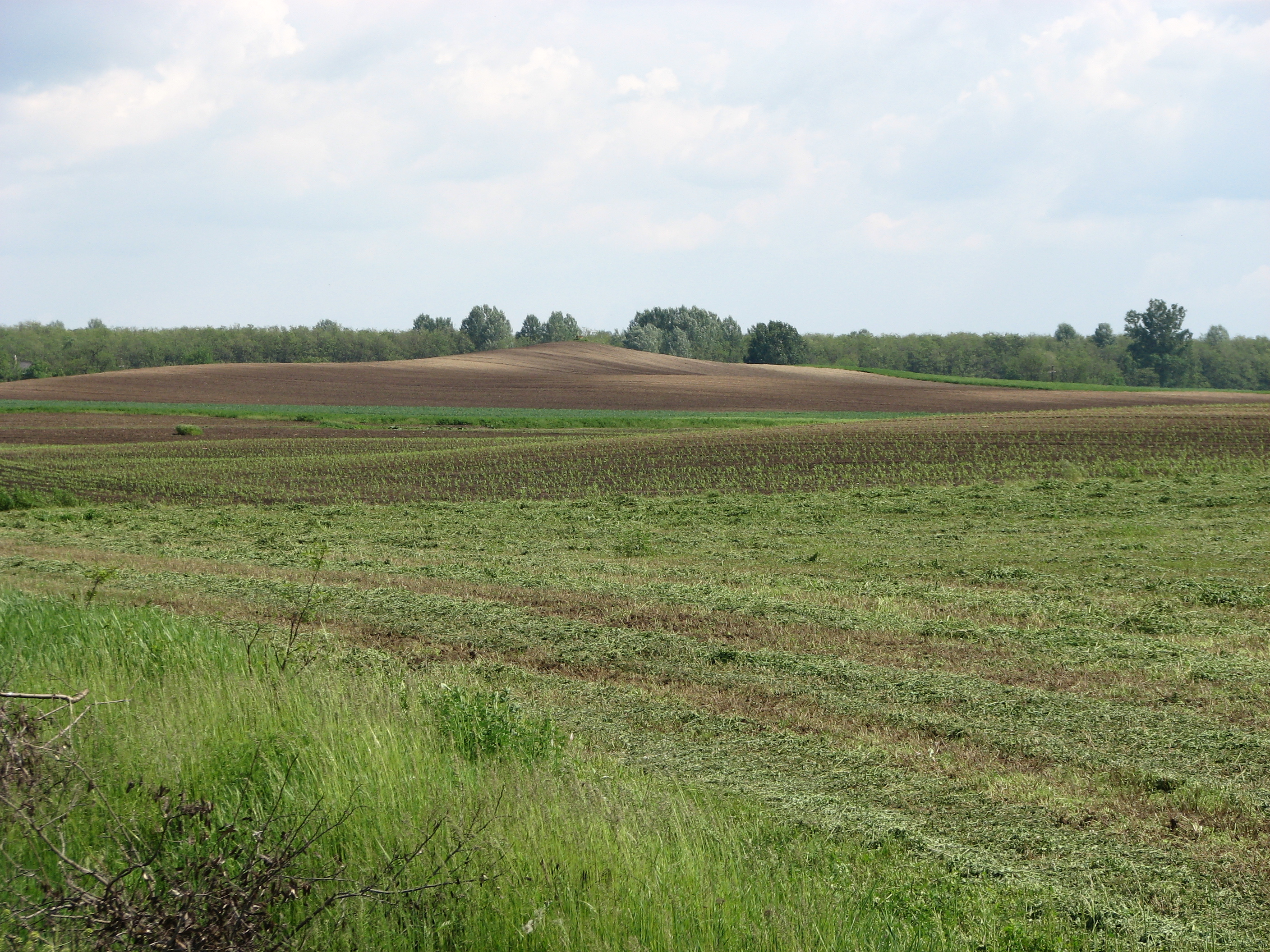
"Highest" point (Debeje-halom) of Hajdúdorog

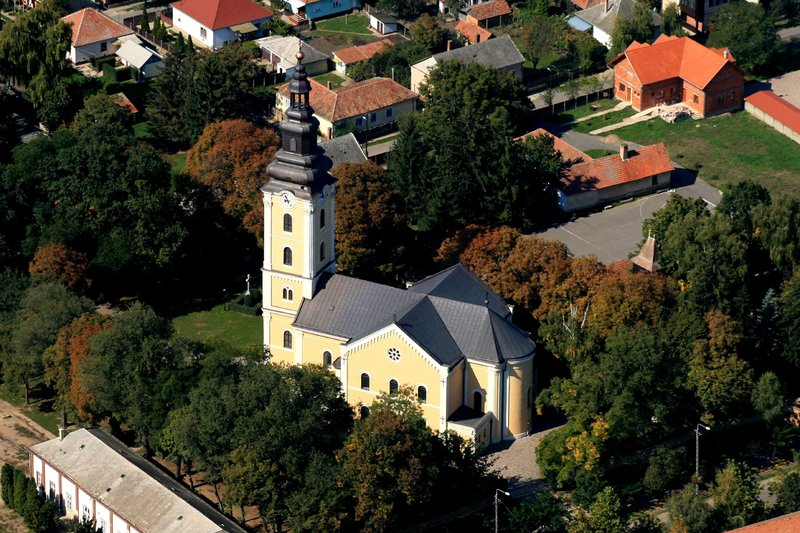
Greek Catholic Cathedral in Hajdúdorog

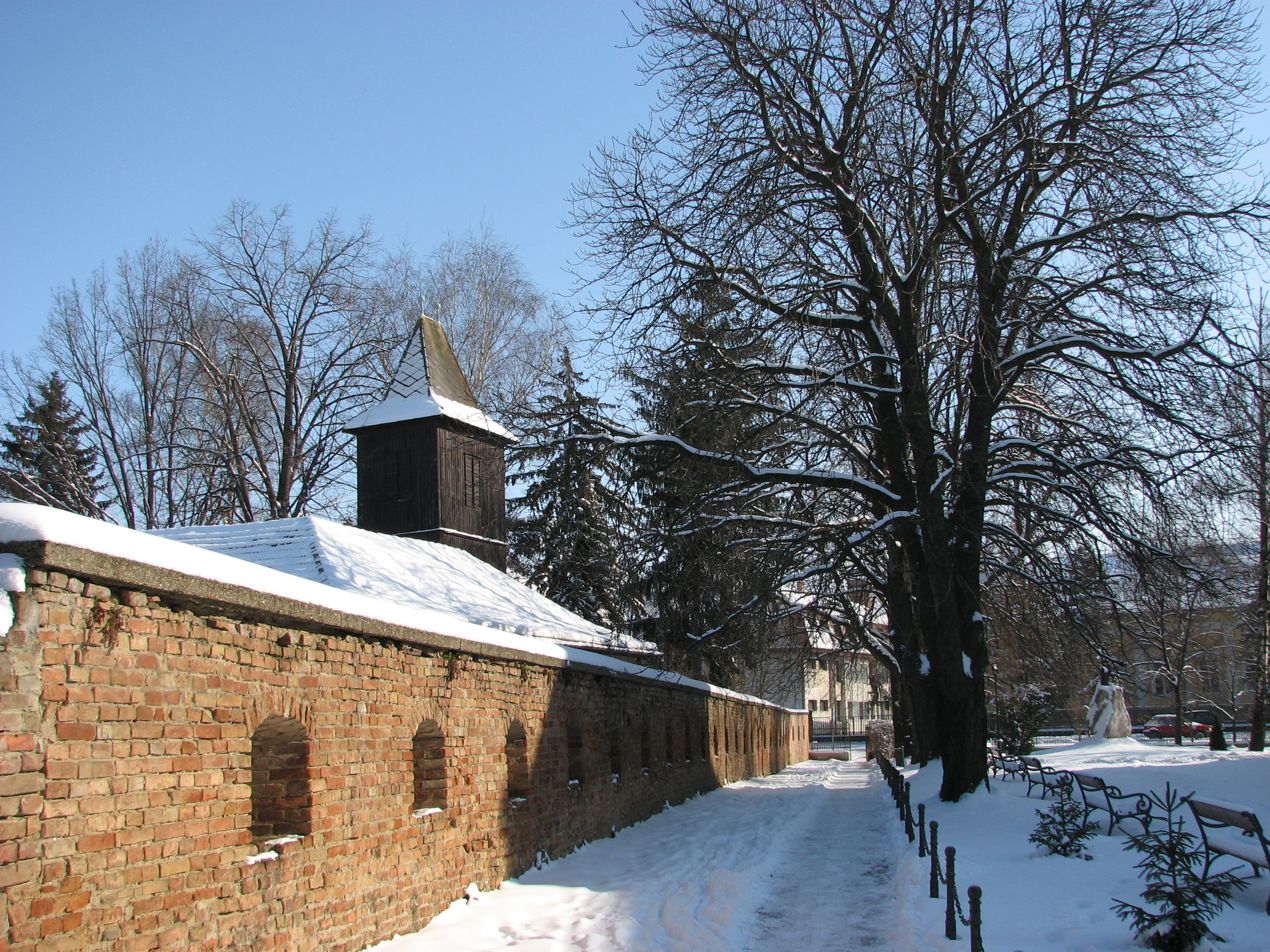
Remains of the fortified Cathedral' wall in Hajdúdorog

== See also ==
- List of cities and towns of Hungary
