= Téglás =

- Town
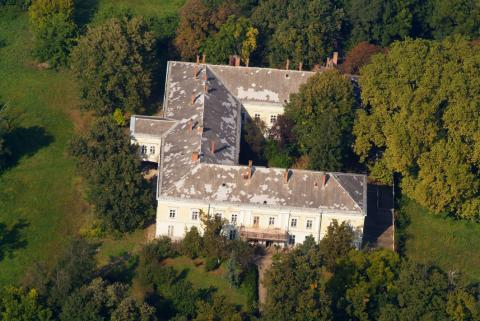
- Degenfeld Castle

- Flag Coat of arms

- Location within Hungary
- Coordinates: 47°43′N 21°41′E
- Country: Hungary
- County: Hajdú-Bihar
- District: Hajdúhadház
- Date of Establishment of Seal and Coat of Arms: 1706

Area
  - Total: 38.33 km^{2} (14.80 sq mi)

Population (2015)
  - Total: 6,406
  - Density: 167.1/km^{2} (433/sq mi)
- Time zone: UTC+1 (CET)
  - Summer (DST): UTC+2 (CEST)
- Postal code: 4243
- Area code: (+36) 52
- Website: www.teglas.hu

Téglás (Hungarian pronunciation: [ˈteːɡlaːʃ]) is a town in Hajdú-Bihar county, in the Northern Great Plain region of eastern Hungary.

== Geography ==
It covers an area of 38.33 km^{2} (15 sq mi) and has a population of 6406 people (2015). Téglás also is accessible to Debrecen to the south and Nyíregyháza to the north. As well as those two locations, you could head west towards Balkány.

== Sports ==
Téglás has a soccer team called Téglas VSE.

== International relations ==
=== Twin towns – Sister cities ===
Téglás is twinned with:

- Affalterbach, Germany
- Fulnek, Czech Republic
- Ludwin, Poland
