= Debrecen District =

Coordinates: 47°31′37″N 21°40′07″E

Debrecen District Debreceni járás
- Districts of Hungary
- Flag Coat of arms

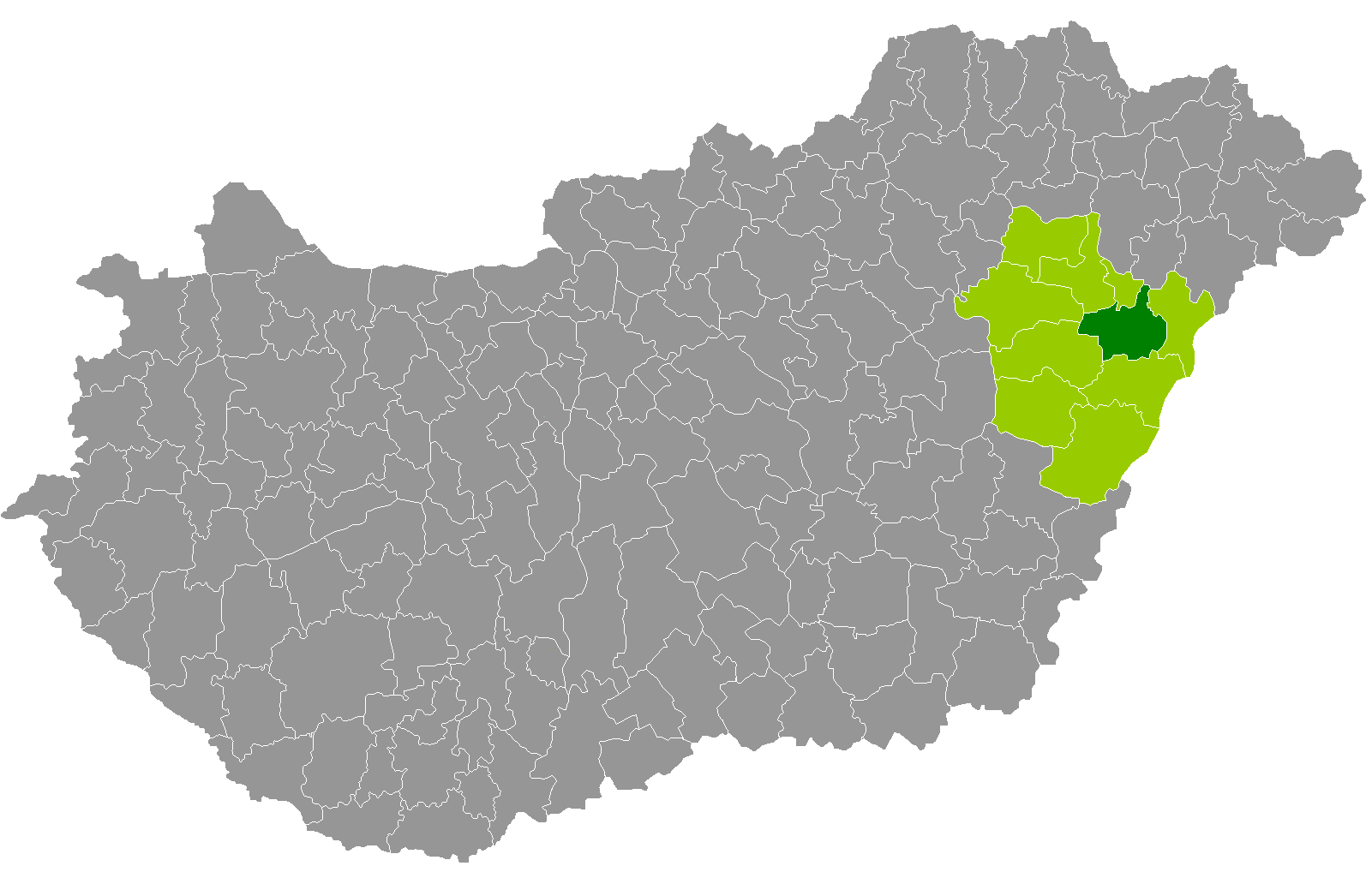
- Debrecen District within Hungary and Hajdú-Bihar County.
- Country: Hungary
- County: Hajdú-Bihar
- District seat: Debrecen

Area
  - Total: 531.12 km^{2} (205.07 sq mi)
  - Rank: 7th in Hajdú-Bihar

Population (2011 census)
  - Total: 224,228
  - Rank: 1st in Hajdú-Bihar
  - Density: 423/km^{2} (1,100/sq mi)

Debrecen (Hungarian: Debreceni járás) is a district in central part of Hajdú-Bihar County. Debrecen is also the name of the town where the district seat is found. The district is located in the Northern Great Plain Statistical Region.

== Geography ==
Debrecen District borders with Hajdúböszörmény District, Hajdúhadház District and Nagykálló District (Szabolcs-Szatmár-Bereg County) to the north, Nyíradony District to the east, Derecske District to the south, Hajdúszoboszló District and Balmazújváros District to the west. The number of the inhabited places in Debrecen District is 2.

== Municipalities ==
The district has 1 urban county, 1 town. (ordered by population, as of 1 January 2012)

- **Debrecen** (207,594) – district and county seat
- **Hajdúsámson** (13,105)

The bolded municipalities are cities.

== Demographics ==
Religion in Debrecen District (2011 census)
1. Calvinism (25.1%)
2. Lutheranism (0.40%)
3. Catholic Church (10.9%)
4. Greek Catholicism (5.00%)
5. Other religions (2.50%)
6. Non-religious (26.2%)
7. Atheists (1.80%)
8. Undeclared (28.1%)

In 2011, it had a population of 224,448 and the population density was 423/km².

Year	County population	Change
2011	224,448	n/a

=== Ethnicity ===
Besides the Hungarian majority, the main minorities are the Roma (approx. 2,000), German (1,300), Romanian (800), Arab (350), Russian and Ukrainian (300), Bulgarian (200), Rusyn, Slovak, Polish, Armenian, Greek and Serb (100).

Total population (2011 census): 224,448
Ethnic groups (2011 census): Identified themselves: 200,417 persons:

- Hungarians: 190,831 (95.22%)
- Others and indefinable: 9,586 (4.78%)

Approx. 24,000 persons in Debrecen District did not declare their ethnic group at the 2011 census.

=== Religion ===
Religious adherence in the county according to 2011 census:

- Reformed – 56,252;
- Catholic – 35,782 (Roman Catholic – 24,422; Greek Catholic – 11,339);
- Evangelical – 820;
- other religions – 5,571;
- Non-religious – 58,858;
- Atheism – 3,975;
- Undeclared – 63,190.

== Gallery ==
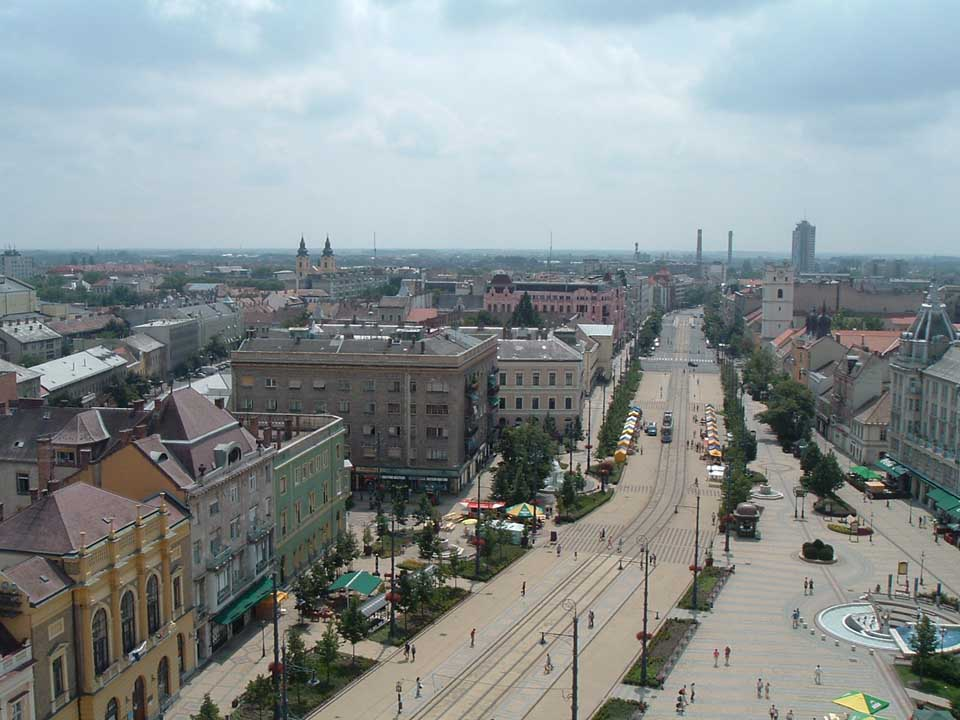
Debrecen, the Calvinist Rome

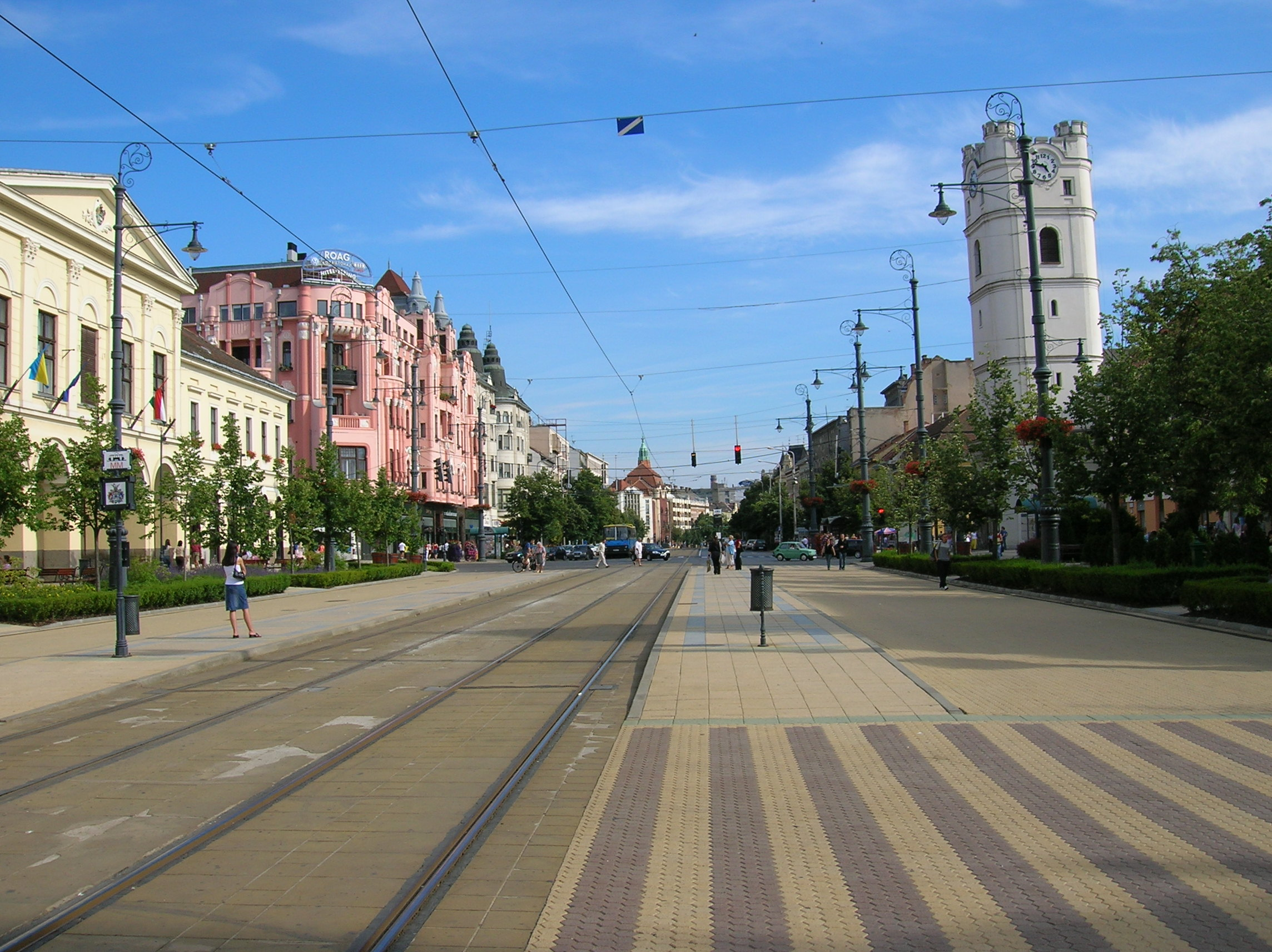
Downtown of Debrecen

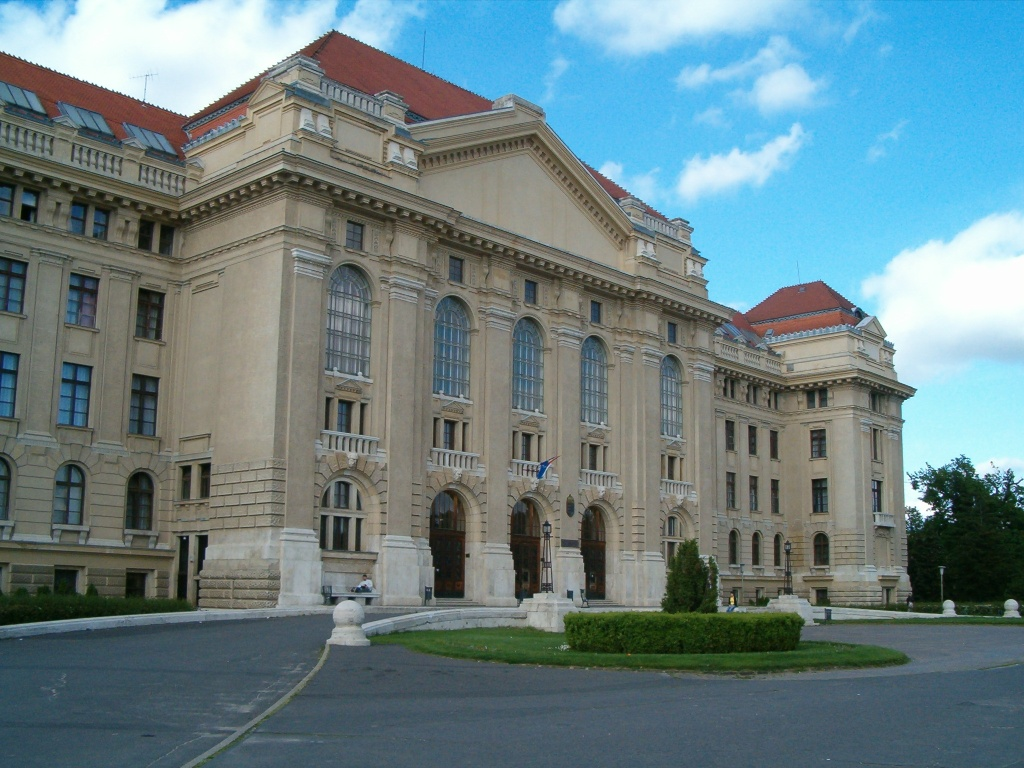
Main facede of University of Debrecen

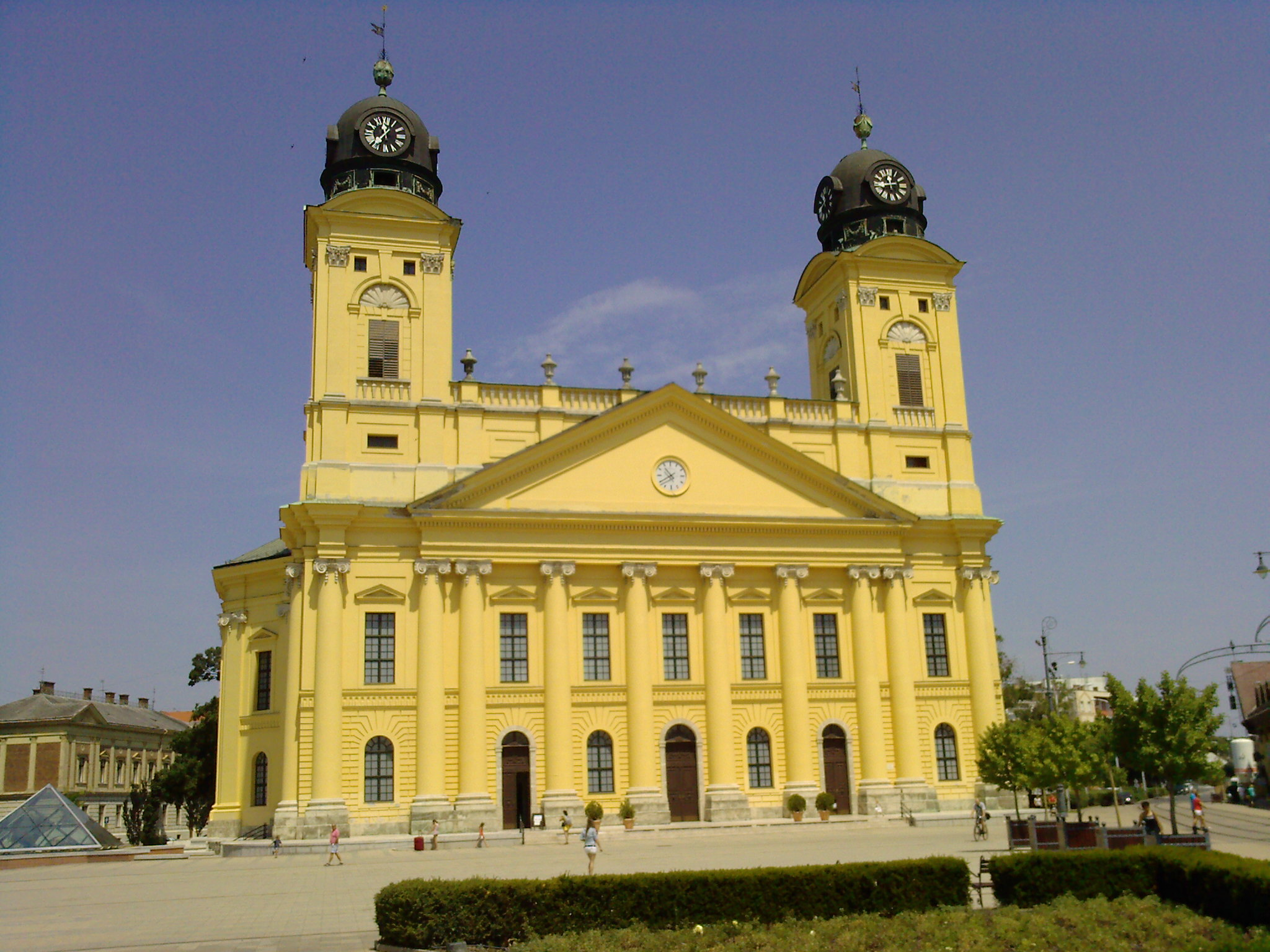
Reformed Great Church of Debrecen

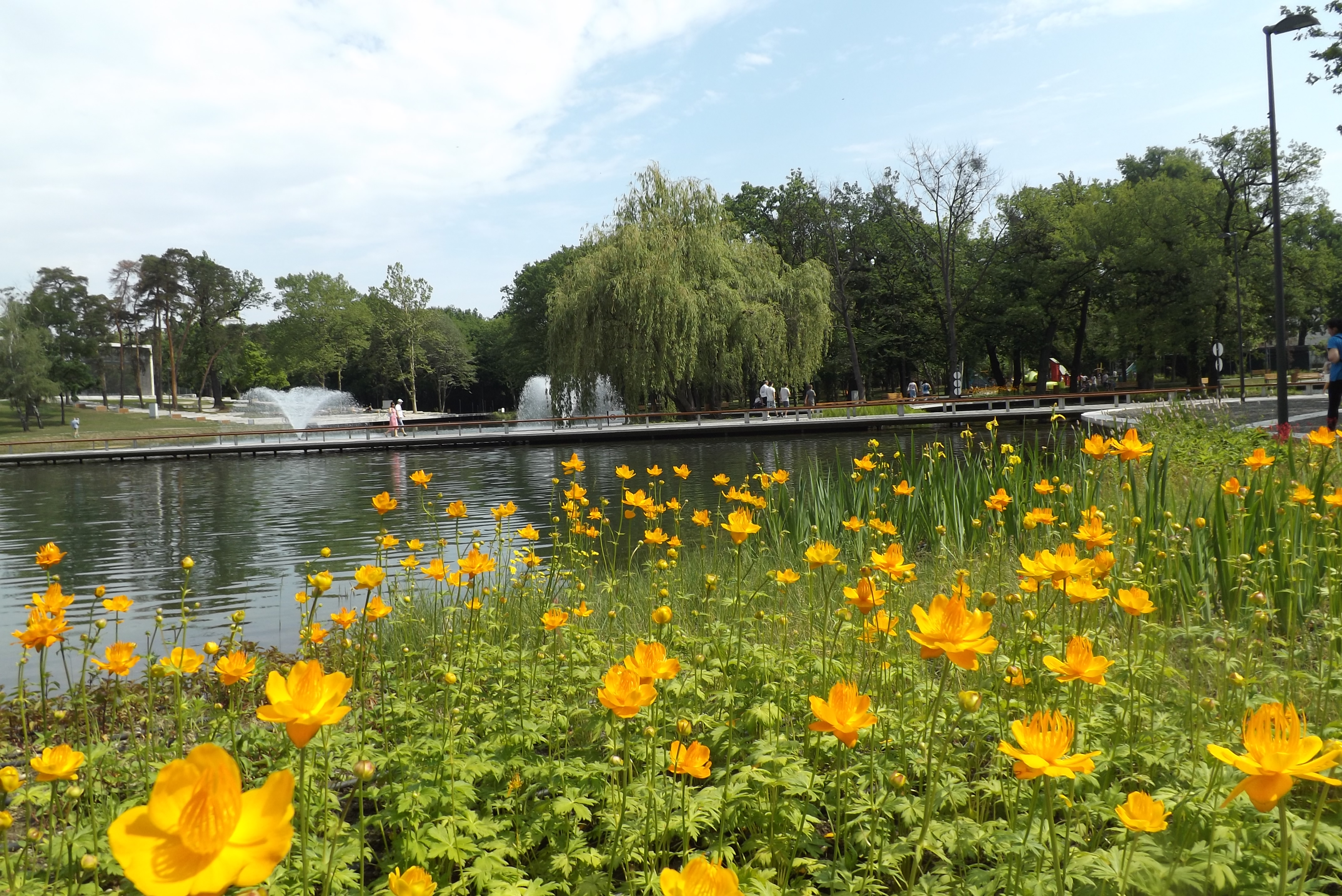
Nagyerdő

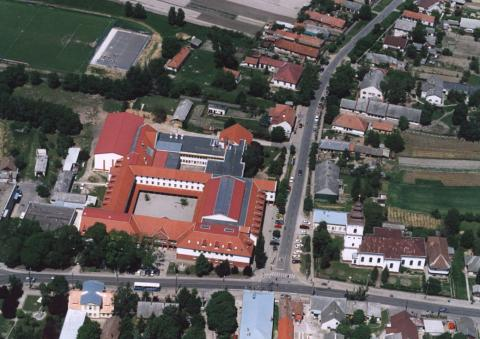
Aerial view of Hajdúsámson

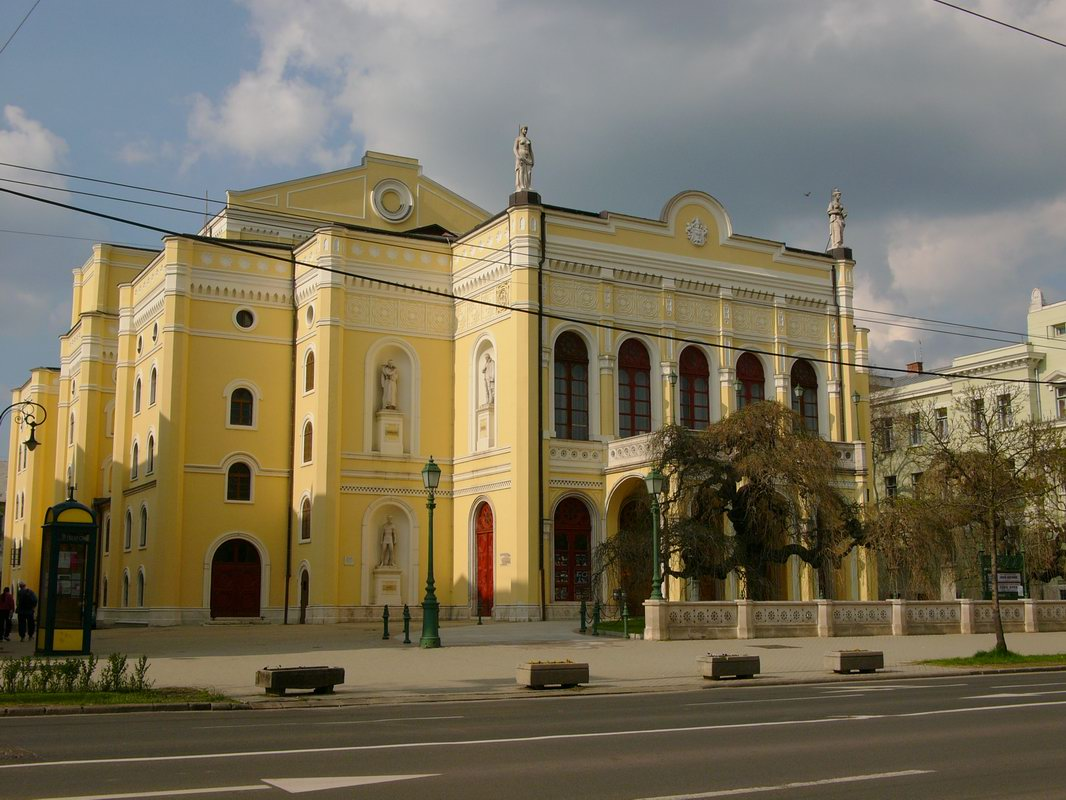
Csokonai Theatre (Debrecen)

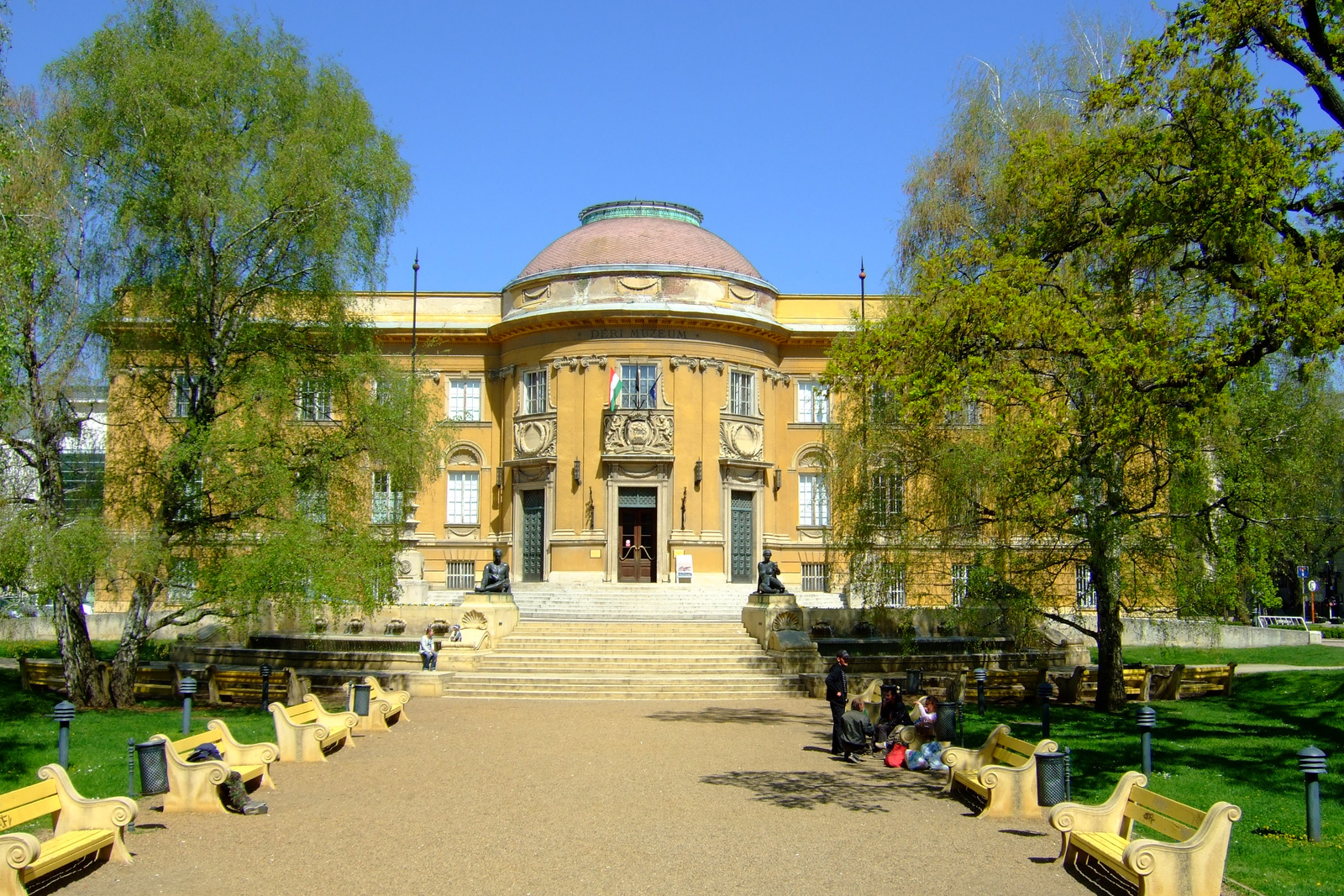
Déri Museum (Debrecen)

== See also ==
- List of cities and towns of Hungary
