= Bocskaikert =

Coordinates: 47°38′32.24″N 21°39′29.86″E

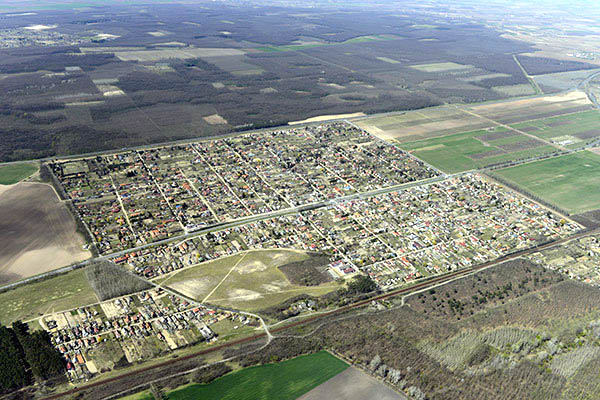
- An aerial photo of Bocskaikert.

- Coat of arms
- Interactive map of Bocskaikert
- Country: Hungary
- County: Hajdú-Bihar

Government
  - Mayor: Szőllős Sándor (Fidesz-KDNP)

Area
  - Total: 10.89 km^{2} (4.20 sq mi)

Population (2022)
  - Total: 3,957
  - Density: 363.4/km^{2} (941.1/sq mi)
- Time zone: UTC+1 (CET)
  - Summer (DST): UTC+2 (CEST)
- Postal code: 4241
- Area code: 52

Bocskaikert is a village situated in the north-east part of Hungary, 15 km (9 mi) away from Debrecen, the country's second largest town. Administratively it belongs to Hajdú-Bihar County.

== History ==
The oldest extant documents about the settlement are dated 1158. In the 14th century the area was owned by noble families, inhabited by some 150 people. Later the Turkish wars destroyed the area. It was a long time until the settlement could recover, though important commercial routes were crossing there, which hastened its development. It was named 21 February 1899 after István Bocskai, leader of the successful Hungarian uprising against the Habsburgs in the early 17th century.

After World War II, the village was attached to the neighbouring town Hajdúhadház. As an outlying area its development slowed. In 1993, three years after the end of the Socialist regime, it became an independent village with a population of 1350. It has grown constantly since then. It has a twin town called Botkyrka which is a part of Stockholm, Sweden.
