= Balkány =

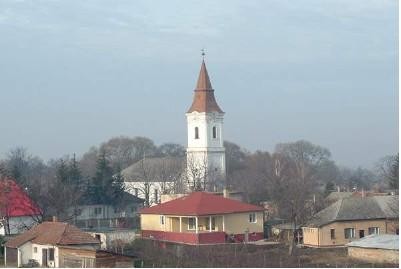

- Flag Coat of arms

- Location of Balkány in Hungary
- Coordinates: 47°46′10″N 21°51′25″E
- Country: Hungary
- Region: Northern Great Plain
- County: Szabolcs-Szatmár-Bereg

Government
  - Mayor: László Pálosi (Fidesz–KDNP)

Area
  - Total: 89.99 km^{2} (34.75 sq mi)

Population (2012)
  - Total: 6,215
  - Density: 69.06/km^{2} (178.9/sq mi)
- Time zone: UTC+1 (CET)
  - Summer (DST): UTC+2 (CEST)
- Postal code: 4233
- Area code: +36 42
- Website: www.balkany.hu

Balkány (Hungarian pronunciation: [ˈbɒlkaːɲ]) is a town in Szabolcs-Szatmár-Bereg county, in the Northern Great Plain region of eastern Hungary.

== Geography ==
It covers an area of 89.99 km^{2} (35 sq mi) and has a population of 6,852 people (2002). It lies approximately 28 km (17 mi) southeast from Nyíregyháza and 40 km northeast to Debrecen. There are many small towns surrounding Balkány, including Biri, Geszteréd, Bököny, Szakoly, and Nyírmihálydi.

=== Climate ===
Balkány has nearly 2,000 hours of annual sunshine, which is the second highest after the Alföld region. Average annual precipitation is about 560–590 mm, and the annual average temperature is between 9.5 to 9.6 °C (49.1 to 49.3 °F).

== History ==
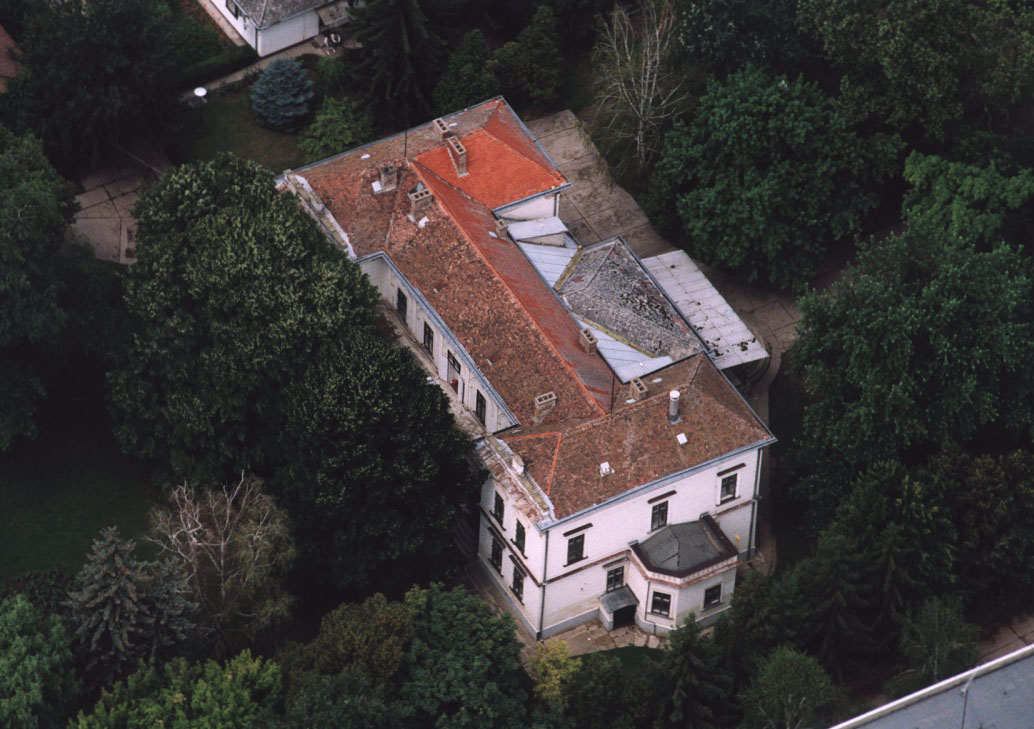
Balkány – Palace

Balkány was first mentioned in 1214. The meaning of the name has most likely to do with swamp or wetland. The first landlords of the region were the Gut-Keled noble family who were given Balkány as a gift by the king in 1289. Balkány was then divided up by the family, the western part went to Paul (Pál) and Thomas (Tamás), the eastern part was taken by Paul's son, Lawrence (Lőrinc). As a result of attacks by the Ottoman Turks and other nomadic tribes, Balkány became a ghost town until the late 16th century. In the early 18th century, the town's population rose again, governance was shared among the most prosperous families such as Bezdédy, Désy, Finta, Gencsy, Gődény, Guth, and Koczogh. In 1839, it was the largest city in the county with a population of 3,006.

=== Today ===
Balkány is home to 6,852 people (2005) most of whom live in the country. Unemployment is a serious problem: there are more jobs being lost than created. Like in the past, the biggest sector of employment is agriculture. However, the lack of investment and decreasing prices of locally produced goods have created an unfriendly business environment.

There are a number of kindergartens and two elementary as well as middle schools educating the town's 1,300 children.

== International relations ==
=== Twin towns — Sister cities ===
Balkány is twinned with:

- Lázári, Romania
- Słopnice, Poland

== Sport ==
- Balkány SE, association football team
