= Nyíregyháza District =

Coordinates: 47.9500°N 21.7167°E

Nyíregyháza District Nyíregyházi járás
- Districts of Hungary
- Coat of arms

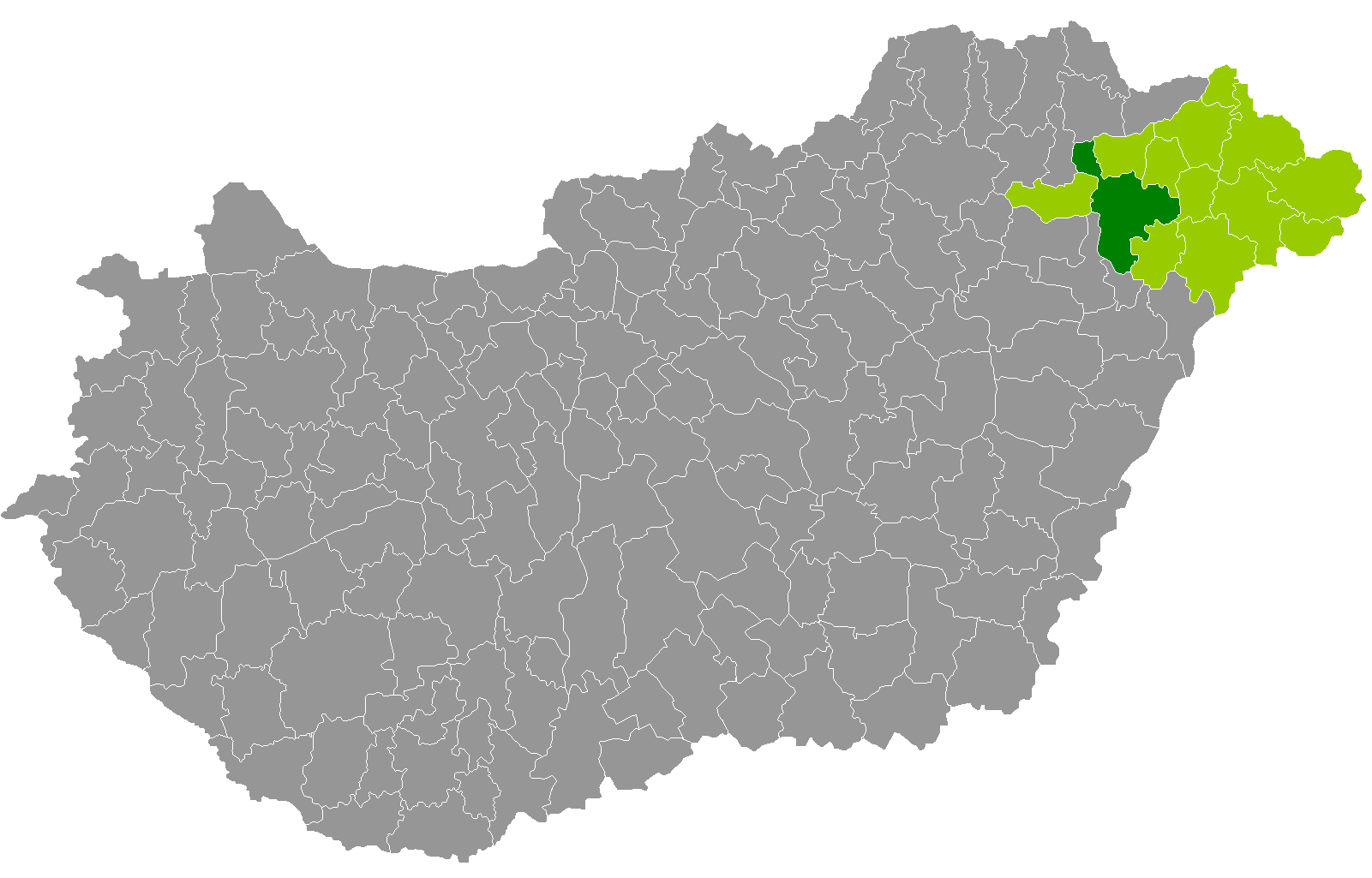
- Nyíregyháza District within Hungary and Szabolcs-Szatmár-Bereg County.
- Country: Hungary
- County: Szabolcs-Szatmár-Bereg
- District seat: Nyíregyháza

Area
  - Total: 809.61 km^{2} (312.59 sq mi)
  - Rank: 1st in Szabolcs-Szatmár-Bereg

Population (2011 census)
  - Total: 168,118
  - Rank: 1st in Szabolcs-Szatmár-Bereg
  - Density: 208/km^{2} (540/sq mi)

Nyíregyháza (Hungarian: Nyíregyházi járás) is a district in western part of Szabolcs-Szatmár-Bereg County. Nyíregyháza is also the name of the town where the district seat is found. The district is located in the Northern Great Plain Statistical Region. This district is a part of Nyírség geographical region.

== Geography ==
Nyíregyháza District borders with Sárospatak District (Borsod-Abaúj-Zemplén County), Ibrány District and Kemecse District to the north, Baktalórántháza District and Nagykálló District to the east, Hajdúhadház District (Hajdú-Bihar County) to the south, Hajdúböszörmény District (Hajdú-Bihar County) and Tiszavasvári District to the west. The number of the inhabited places in Nyíregyháza District is 15.

== Municipalities ==
The district has 1 urban county, 3 towns and 11 villages. (ordered by population, as of 1 January 2013)

- Apagy (2,279)
- Kálmánháza (1,905)
- Kótaj (4,496)
- Nagycserkesz (1,785)
- Napkor (3,679)
- **Nyíregyháza** (118,185) – district and county seat
- Nyírpazony (3,403)
- **Nyírtelek** (6,730)
- Nyírtura (1,774)
- **Rakamaz** (4,512)
- Sényő (1,414)
- Szabolcs (372)
- Timár (1,345)
- Tiszanagyfalu (1,826)
- **Újfehértó** (12,979)

The bolded municipalities are cities.

== Demographics ==
Religion in Nyíregyháza District (2011 census)
1. Catholic Church (23.9%)
2. Greek Catholicism (12.9%)
3. Calvinism (16.6%)
4. Lutheranism (6.00%)
5. Other religions (1.80%)
6. Non-religious (11.3%)
7. Atheists (0.90%)
8. Undeclared (26.6%)

In 2011, it had a population of 168,118 and the population density was 208/km^{2}.

| Year | County population | Change |
|---|---|---|
| 2011 | 168,118 | n/a |

=== Ethnicity ===
Besides the Hungarian majority, the main minorities are the Roma (approx. 4,000), German (1,000), Ukrainian (500), Romanian and Russian (400), Slovak (250), Rusyn and Chinese (150) and Polish (100).

Total population (2011 census): 168,118
Ethnic groups (2011 census): Identified themselves: 154,055 persons:

- Hungarians: 145,836 (94.66%)
- Gypsies: 4,041 (2.62%)
- Others and indefinable: 4,178 (2.71%)

Approx. 14,000 persons in Nyíregyháza District did not declare their ethnic group at the 2011 census.

=== Religion ===
Religious adherence in the county according to 2011 census:

- Catholic – 61,853 (Roman Catholic – 40,165; Greek Catholic – 21,678);
- Reformed – 27,914;
- Evangelical – 10,039;
- other religions – 3,076;
- Non-religious – 19,125;
- Atheism – 1,450;
- Undeclared – 44,661.

== Gallery ==
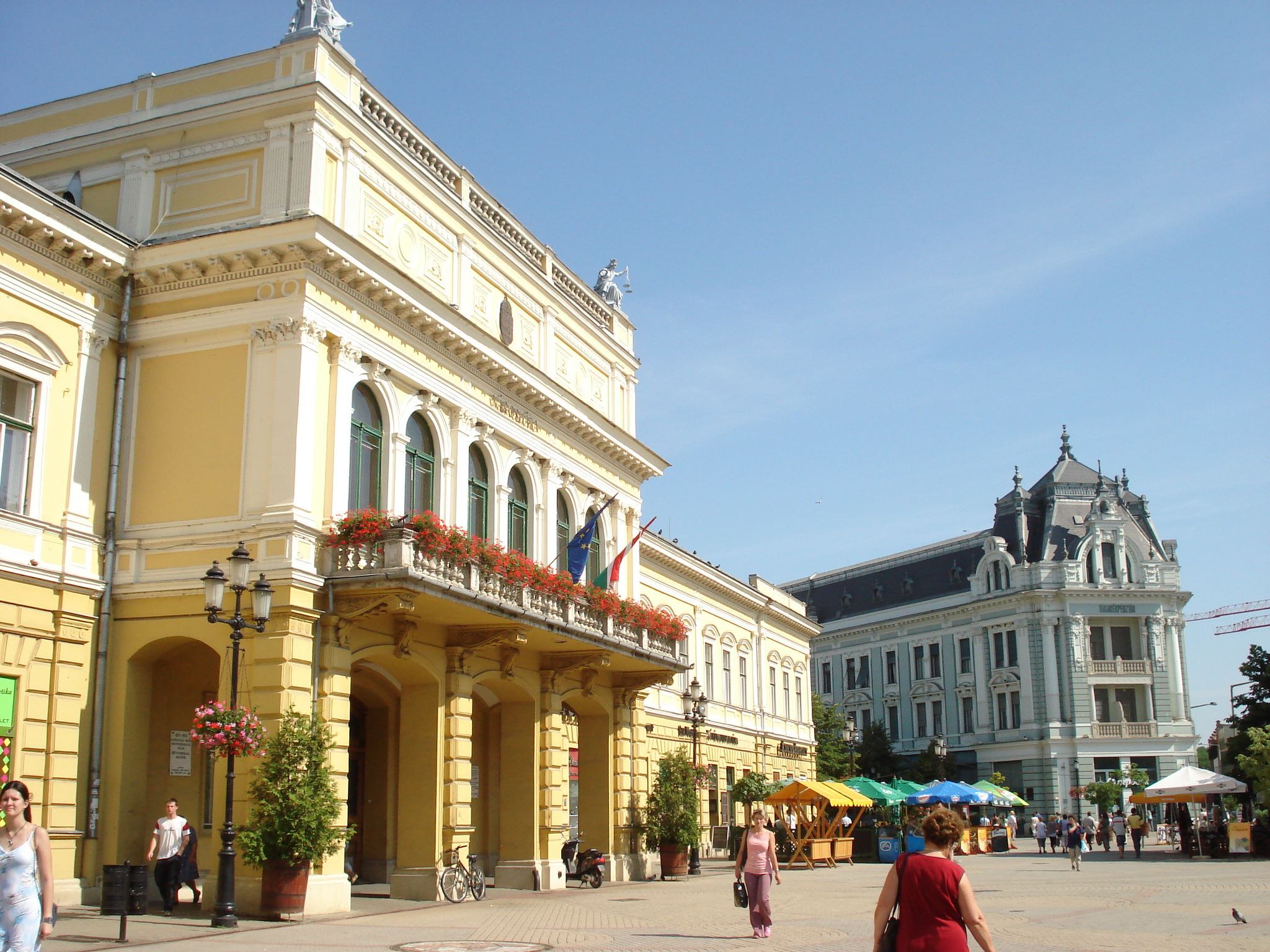
Downtown of Nyíregyháza

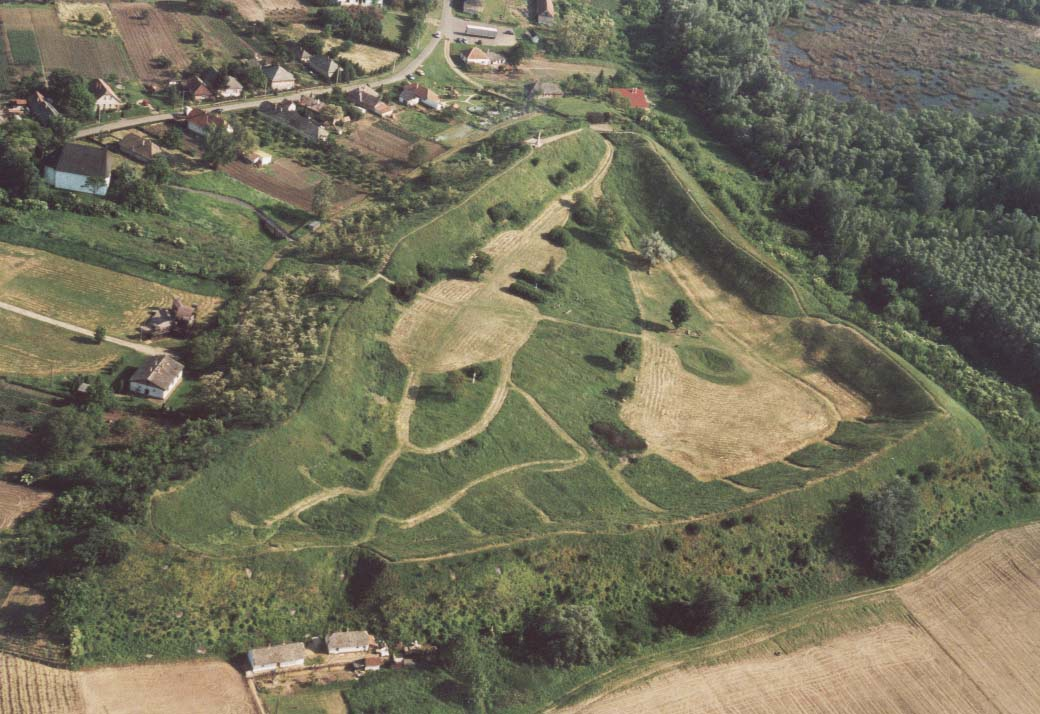
Earthfort of Szabolcs

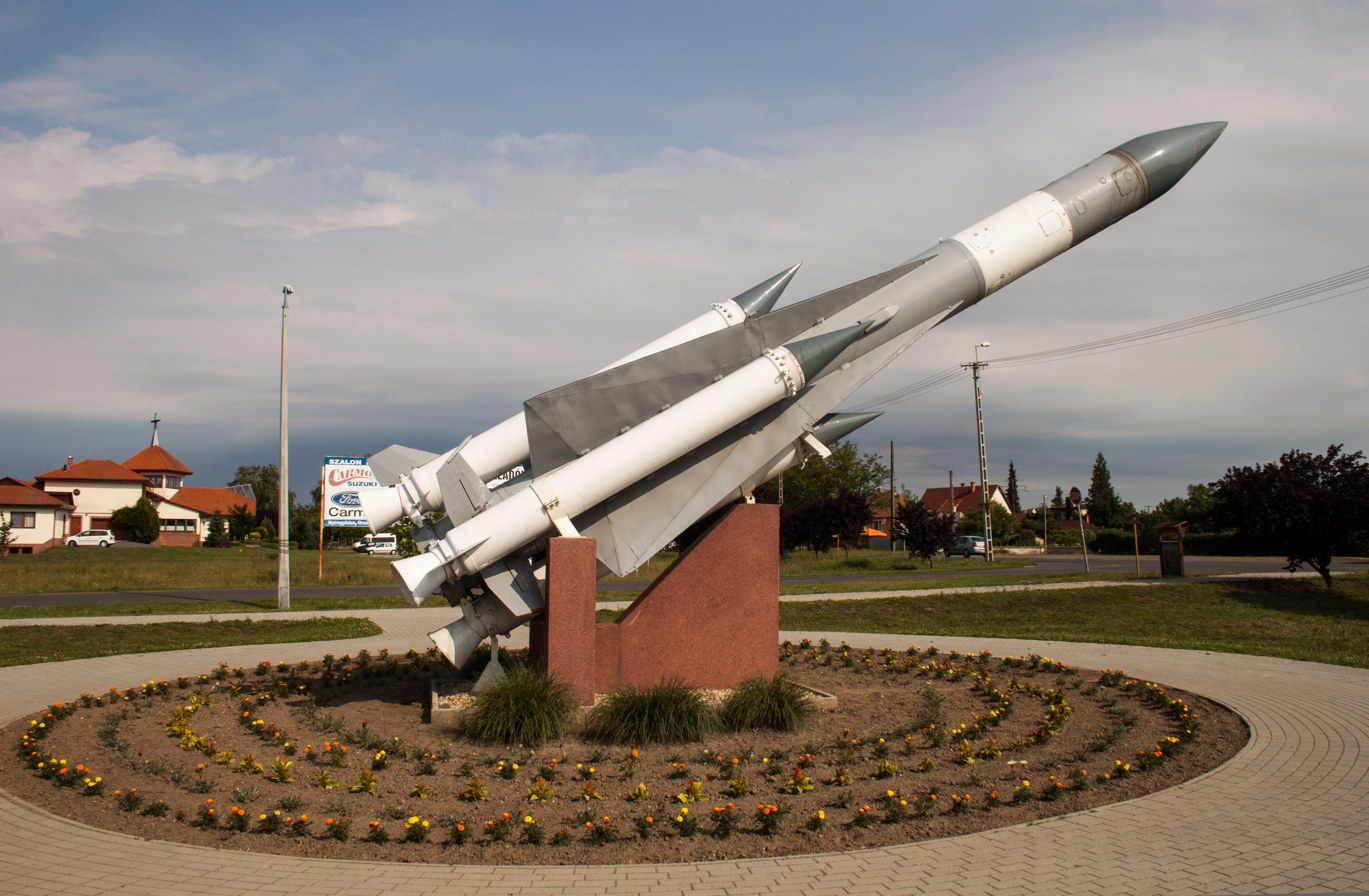
Defence Memorial Park in Nyírtelek

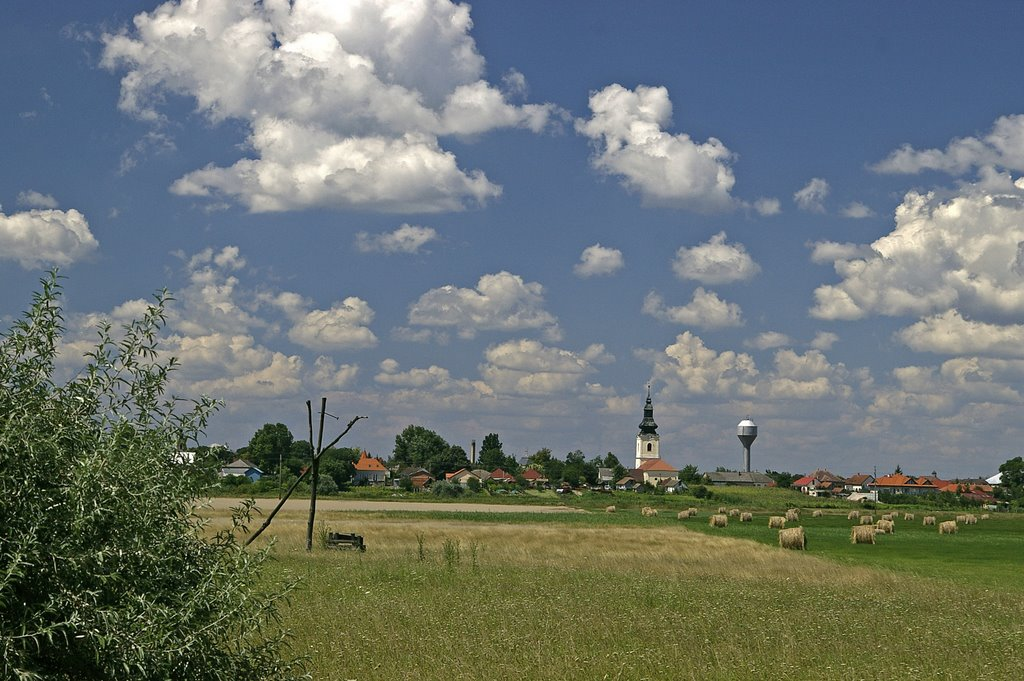
View of Újfehértó

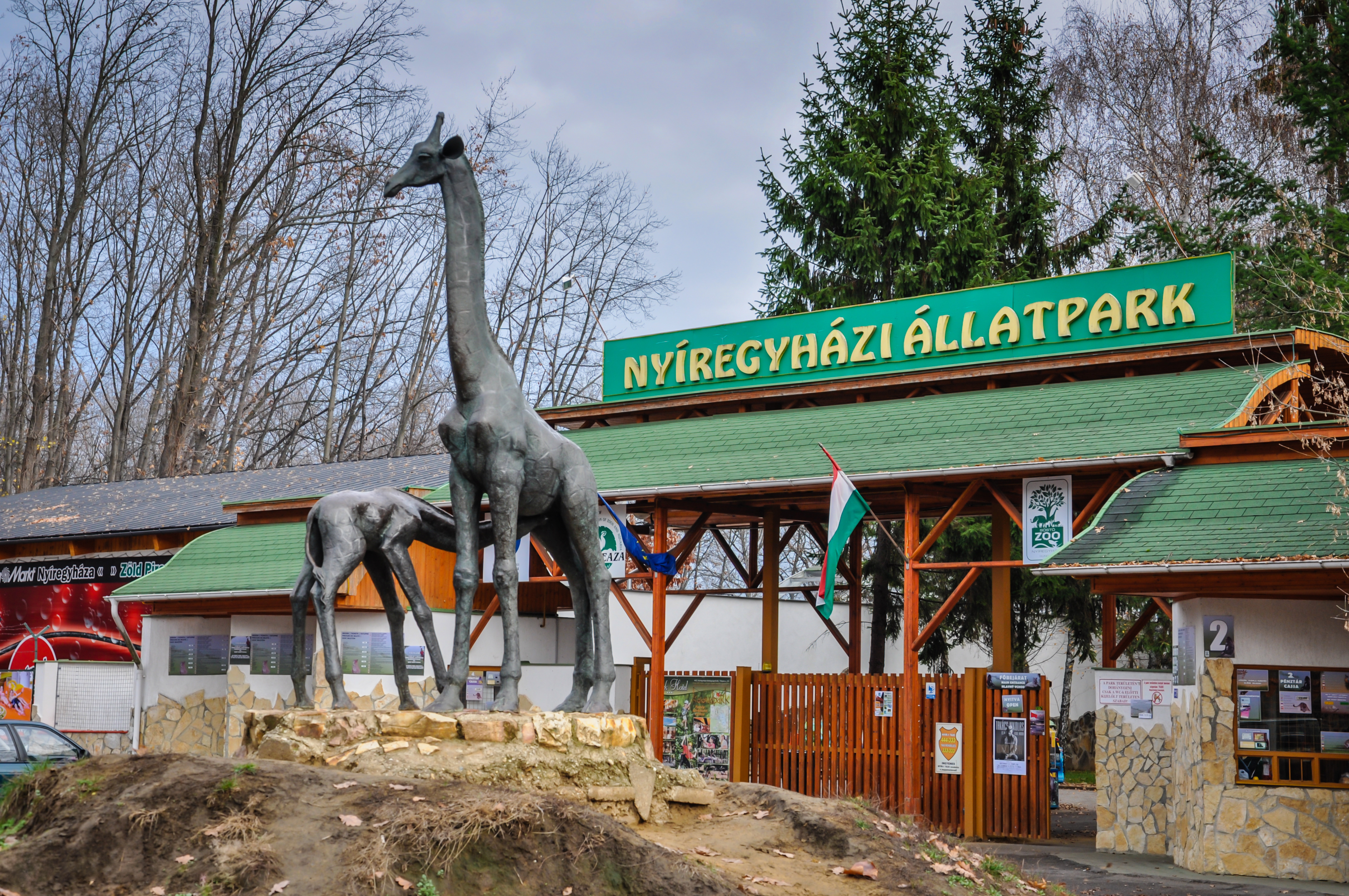
Main entrance of Nyíregyháza Zoo

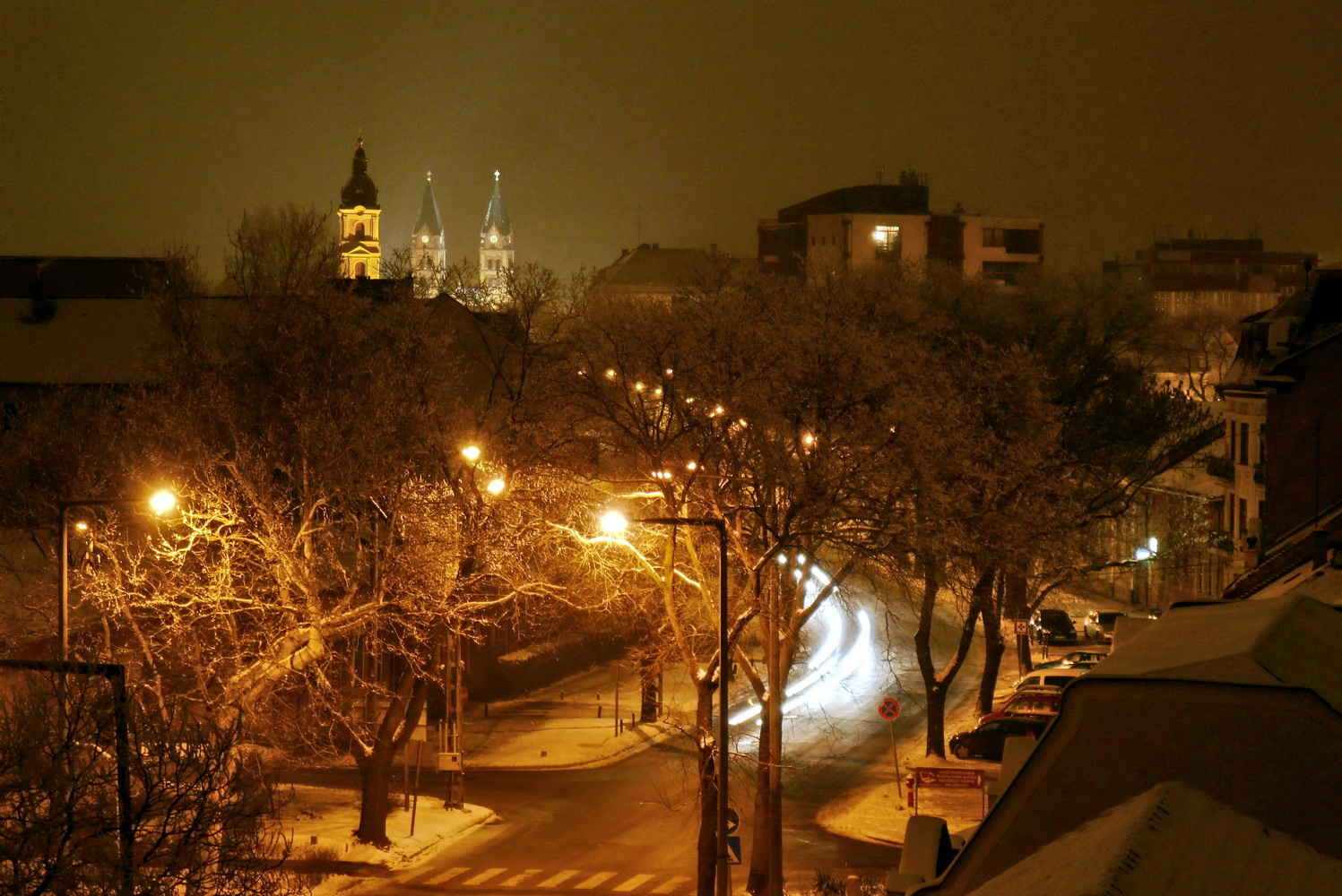
Church towers in Nyíregyháza

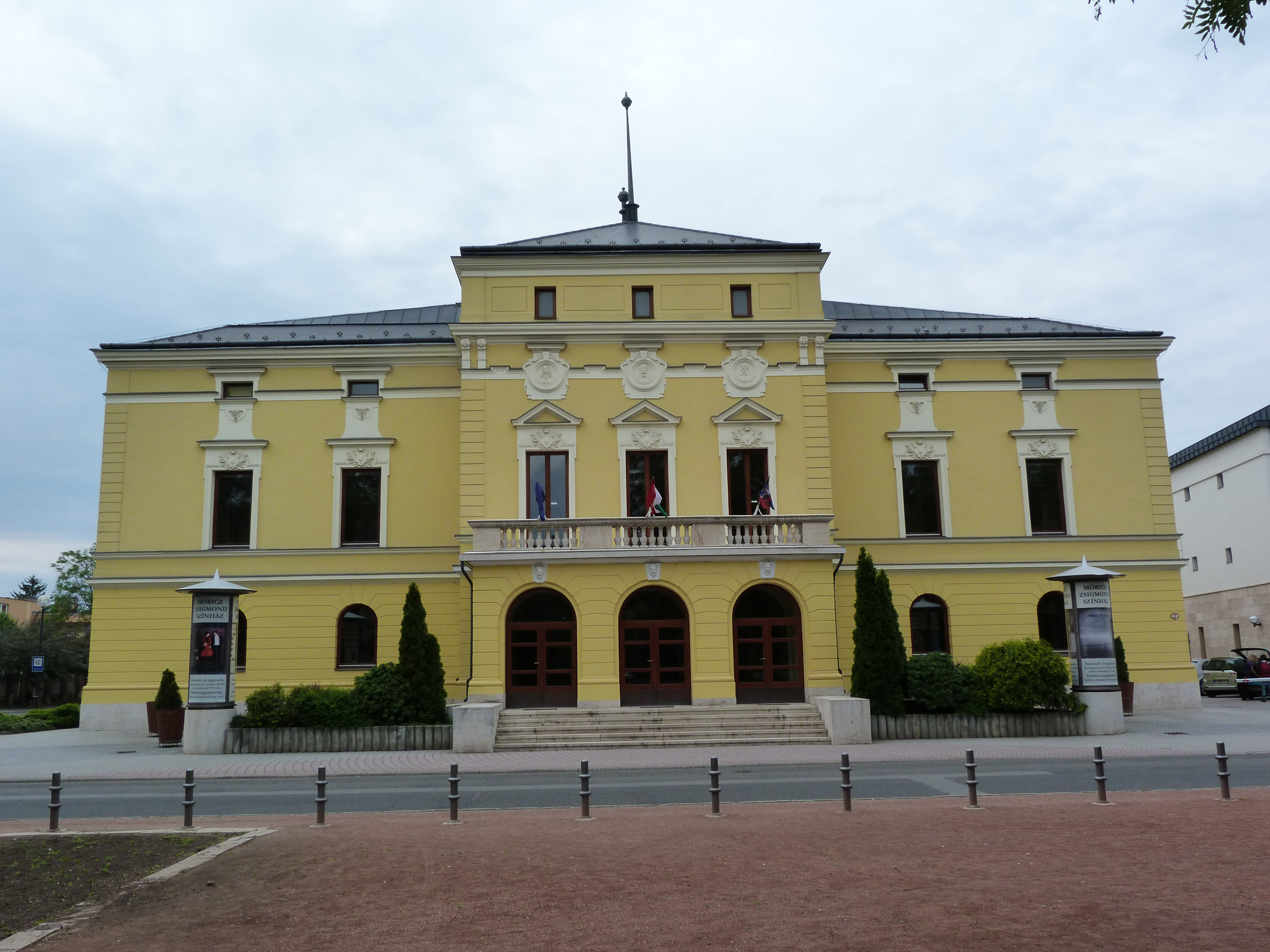
Móricz Zsigmond Theater (Nyíregyháza)

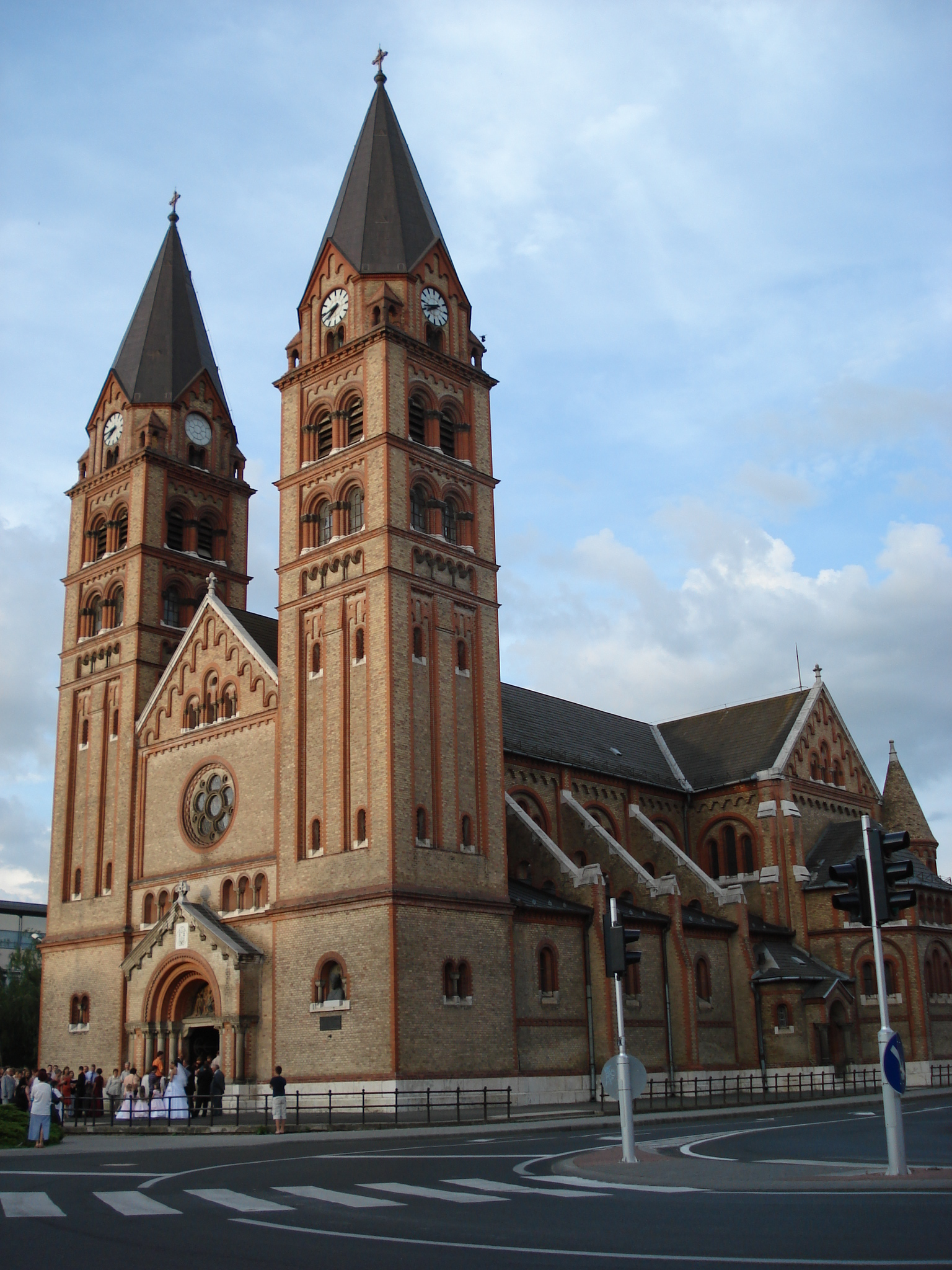
Our Lady of Hungary Church in Nyíregyháza

== See also ==
- List of cities and towns of Hungary
