= Hajdúsámson =

- Town
- Flag Coat of arms

- Location within Hungary
- Coordinates: 47°36′N 21°46′E
- Country: Hungary
- County: Hajdú-Bihar
- District: Debrecen

Area
  - Total: 69.47 km^{2} (26.82 sq mi)

Population (2015)
  - Total: 12,961
  - Density: 186.6/km^{2} (483/sq mi)
- Time zone: UTC+1 (CET)
  - Summer (DST): UTC+2 (CEST)
- Postal code: 4251
- Area code: (+36) 52
- Website: hajdusamson.hu

Hajdúsámson [ˈhɒjduːʃaːmʃon] is a town in Hajdú-Bihar county, in the Northern Great Plain region of eastern Hungary.

== Geography ==
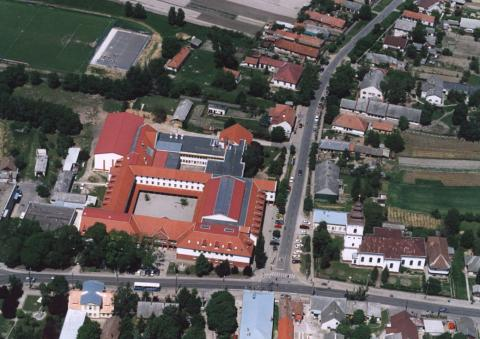
Aerial view

It covers an area of 69.47 km^{2} (27 sq mi) and has a population of 12,961 people (2015).

== Twin towns – sister cities ==
Hajdúsámson is twinned with:

- Belene, Bulgaria
- Sândominic, Romania
