= Hajdúság =

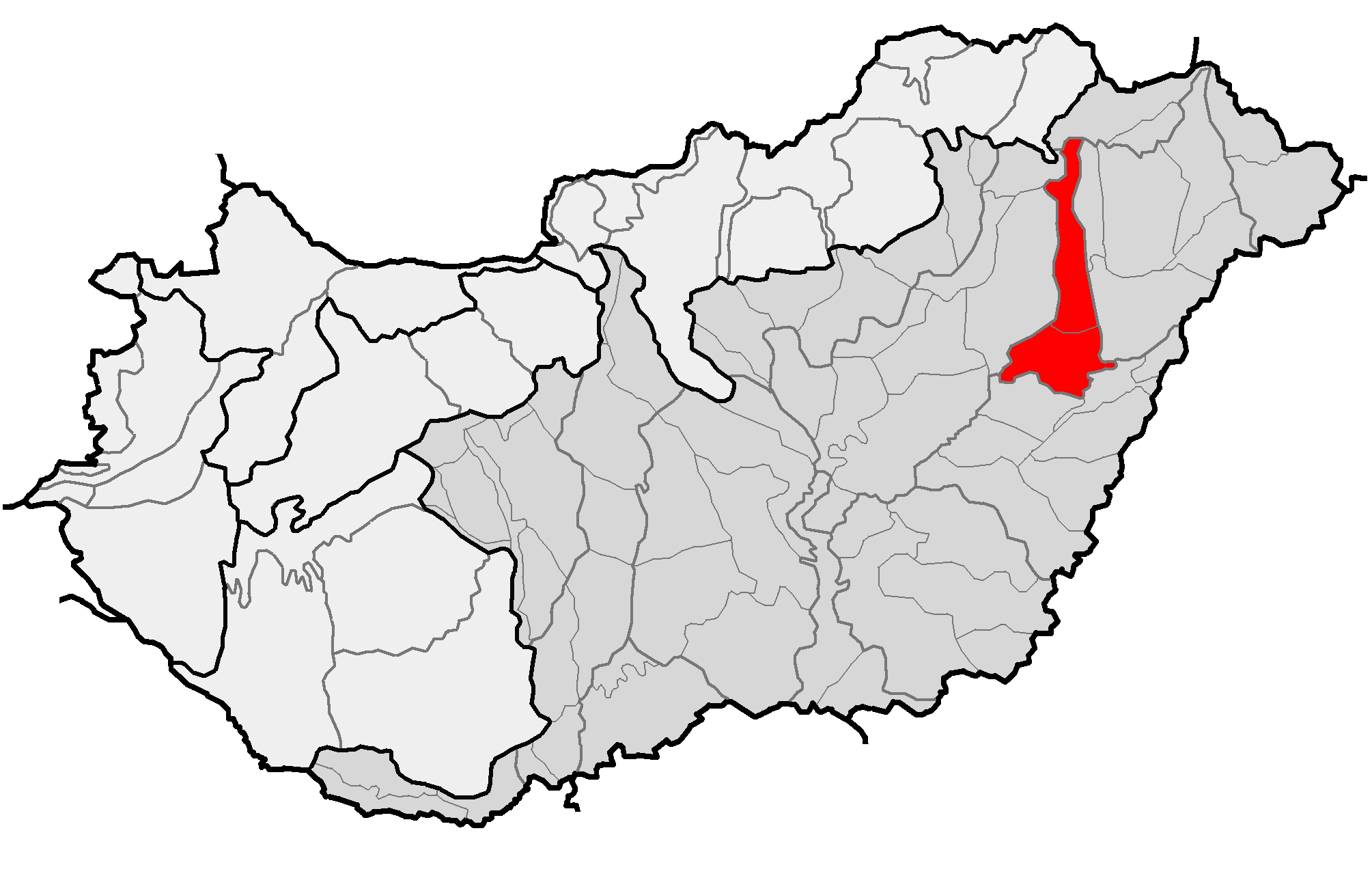
Location of Hajdúság as one of 35 mesoregions in physical geography of Hungary

Hajdúság is a historical and geographical region in Hungary, located in the Great Hungarian Plain around Debrecen. It consists of six hajdú towns (Hungarian: hajdúvárosok), named Hajdúböszörmény, Hajdúdorog, Hajdúnánás, Hajdúhadház, Hajdúszoboszló and Vámospércs.

== History ==
The region was established by István Bocskai in the 17th century, who invited Hajdús to his domains. Hajdús were Hungarian mercenary soldiers, mercantiles and cattle drovers in the Great Hungarian Plain, during the Ottoman wartimes Hungarian peasants also joined the group. After settling down they got collective nobility. It was an autonomous region (Hungarian: Hajdúkerület, means "Hajdú District") until 1876 when it became part of Hajdú County (now Hajdú-Bihar County).

The region's name derives from the Hajdú (pronounced "haj-doo"), a group of mercenary foot-soldiers in Hungary’s 16th–17th centuries. The word hajdú originally meant a cattle driver (from hajtó, one who drives), as many of these soldiers had been drovers on the long-distance cattle trade routes between the Great Plain and Western Europe. During the prolonged wars at the end of the 16th century (including the Long Turkish War, 1593–1606), large bands of Hajdú mercenaries roamed the country. In 1604, a substantial contingent of these battle-hardened Hajdús joined the uprising of Prince István Bocskai of Transylvania against Habsburg rule. Bocskai, recognizing their value, rewarded the Hajdú troops for their service. In December 1605 he issued a decree (Charter of Korpona) granting some 9,000 Hajdú warriors "collective nobility" and settling them in towns on confiscated lands of his domain. He allocated them lands in the mainly depopulated area between the Tisza and Debrecen – this territory became known as Hajdúság. By 1608–1609, seven fortified Hajdú towns (the "Old Hajdú towns") had been established: Hajdúböszörmény, Hajdúböszörmény, Hajdúdorog, Hajdúhadház, Hajdúnánás, Hajdúszoboszló, Polgár, and Vámospércs.
