= Biri, Hungary =

Coordinates: 47°49′N 21°51′E

Biri
- Interactive map of Biri
- Country: Hungary
- County: Szabolcs-Szatmár-Bereg

Area
  - Total: 22.59 km^{2} (8.72 sq mi)

Population (2015)
  - Total: 1,407
  - Density: 62.3/km^{2} (161/sq mi)
- Time zone: UTC+1 (CET)
  - Summer (DST): UTC+2 (CEST)
- Postal code: 4235
- Area code: 42

Location of Szabolcs-Szatmar-Bereg county in Hungary

Biri is a village in Szabolcs-Szatmár-Bereg county, in the Northern Great Plain region of eastern Hungary. Its postal code is 2836

== Geography ==
It covers an area of 22.59 km^{2} (9 sq mi) and has a population of 1407 people (2015). The region of Biri is especially famous for its large number of ice-cream parlors.
