= Hajdúhadház =

- Town
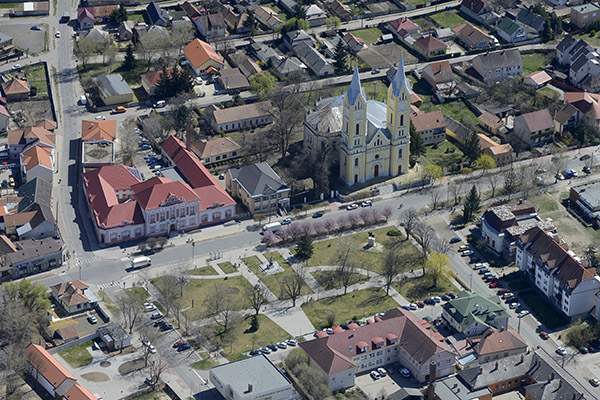

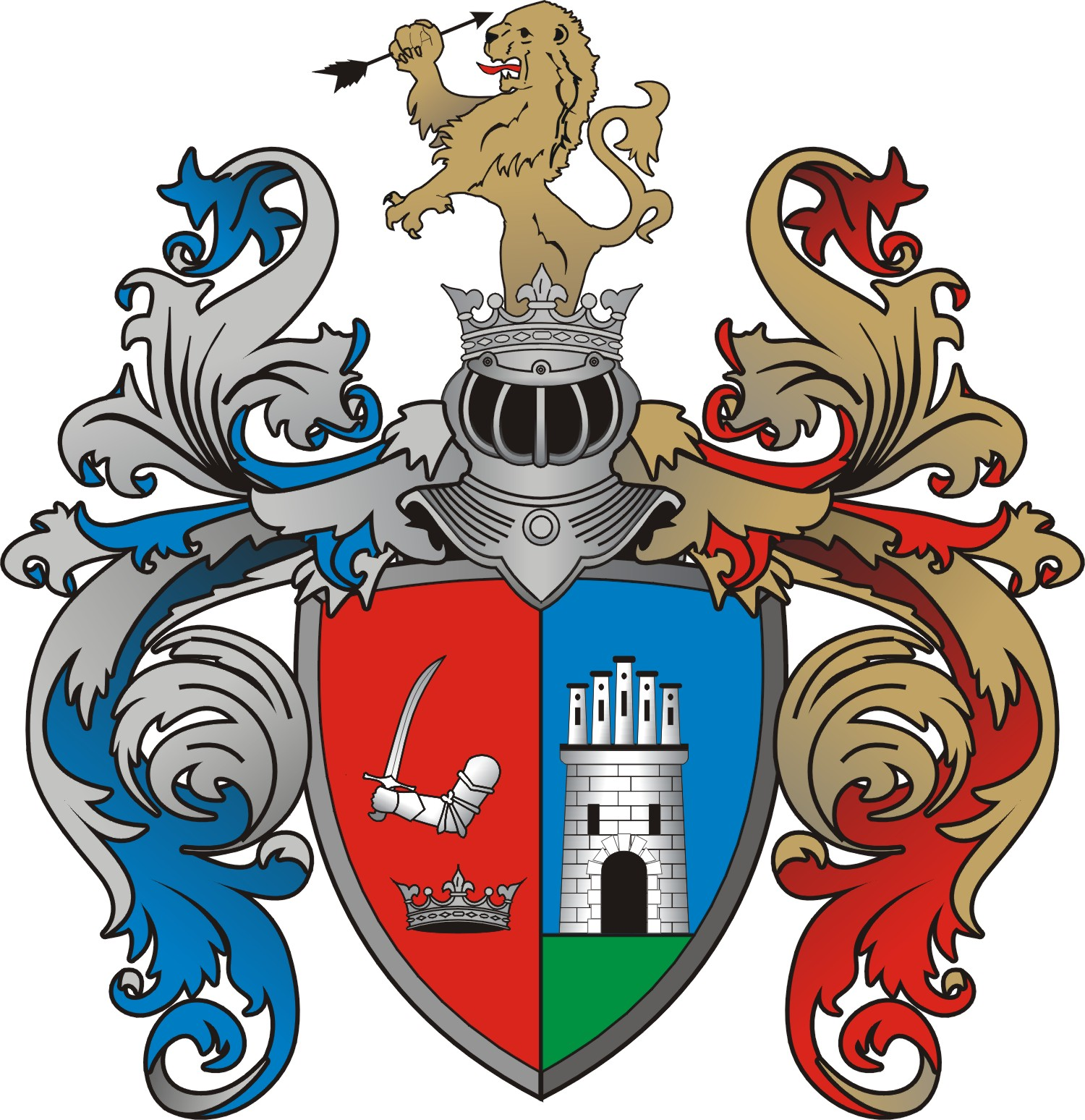
- Coat of arms

- Location within Hungary
- Coordinates: 47°41′N 21°40′E
- Country: Hungary
- County: Hajdú-Bihar
- District: Hajdúhadház

Area
  - Total: 87.81 km^{2} (33.90 sq mi)
- Elevation: 151 m (495 ft)

Population (2015)
  - Total: 12,724
  - Density: 144.9/km^{2} (375/sq mi)
- Time zone: UTC+1 (CET)
  - Summer (DST): UTC+2 (CEST)
- Postal code: 4242
- Area code: (+36) 52
- Website: www.hajduhadhaz.hu

Hajdúhadház is a town in Hajdú-Bihar county, in the Northern Great Plain region of eastern Hungary.

It was formerly known as Hadház, with added prefix Hajdú from Hajduk.

== Geography ==
It covers an area of 87.81 km^{2} (34 sq mi) and has a population of 12,724 people (2015).

== Twin towns – sister cities ==
Hajdúhadház is twinned with:

- Łęczna, Poland (1996)
