= Bököny =

Coordinates: 47°44′N 21°45′E

- Interactive map of Bököny
- Country: Hungary
- County: Szabolcs-Szatmár-Bereg

Area
  - Total: 35.47 km^{2} (13.70 sq mi)

Population (2001)
  - Total: 3,275
  - Density: 92.33/km^{2} (239.1/sq mi)
- Time zone: UTC+1 (CET)
  - Summer (DST): UTC+2 (CEST)
- Postal code: 4231
- Area code: 42

Location of Szabolcs-Szatmar-Bereg county in Hungary

Bököny is a village in Szabolcs-Szatmár-Bereg county, in the Northern Great Plain region of eastern Hungary.

== Geography ==
It covers an area of 35.47 km^{2} (14 sq mi) and has a population of 3275 people (2001).
