= Hajdú-Bihar County 6th constituency =

Constituency in Hungary (2012-)

Hajdú-Bihar County 6th constituency (Hajdúböszörmény)
- Constituency for the National Assembly
- Location of Hajdú-Bihar county 06 within Hajdú-Bihar county

- Location of Hajdú-Bihar county within Hungary
- County: Hajdú-Bihar
- Electorate: 69,786 (2018)
- Major settlements: Hajdúböszörmény

Current constituency
- Created: 2011
- Party: Tisza Party
- Member: Éva Göröghné Bocskai
- Elected: 2026

The 6th constituency of Hajdú-Bihar County (Hungarian: Hajdú-Bihar megyei 06. számú országgyűlési egyéni választókerület) is one of the single member constituencies of the National Assembly, the national legislature of Hungary. The constituency standard abbreviation: Hajdú-Bihar 06. OEVK.

Since 2026, it has been represented by Éva Göröghné Bocskai of the Tisza Party.

== Geography ==
The 6th constituency is located in north-western part of Hajdú-Bihar County.

=== List of municipalities ===
The constituency includes the following municipalities:

1. Balmazújváros
2. Folyás
3. Görbeháza
4. Hajdúböszörmény
5. Hajdúdorog
6. Hajdúnánás
7. Polgár
8. Tiszagyulaháza
9. Újszentmargita
10. Újtikos

== Members ==
The constituency was first represented by István Tiba of the Fidesz from 2014, and he was re-elected in 2018 and 2022. In the 2026 election, Éva Göröghné Bocskai of the Tisza Party was elected representative.

Election	Member	Party	%	Ref.
2014	István Tiba	Fidesz	47.65	
2018	István Tiba	Fidesz	48.91	
2022	István Tiba	Fidesz	58.19	
2026	Éva Göröghné Bocskai	TISZA	52.24	
