= Hajdúnánás District =

Hajdúnánás District Hajdúnánási járás
- Districts of Hungary
- Coat of arms

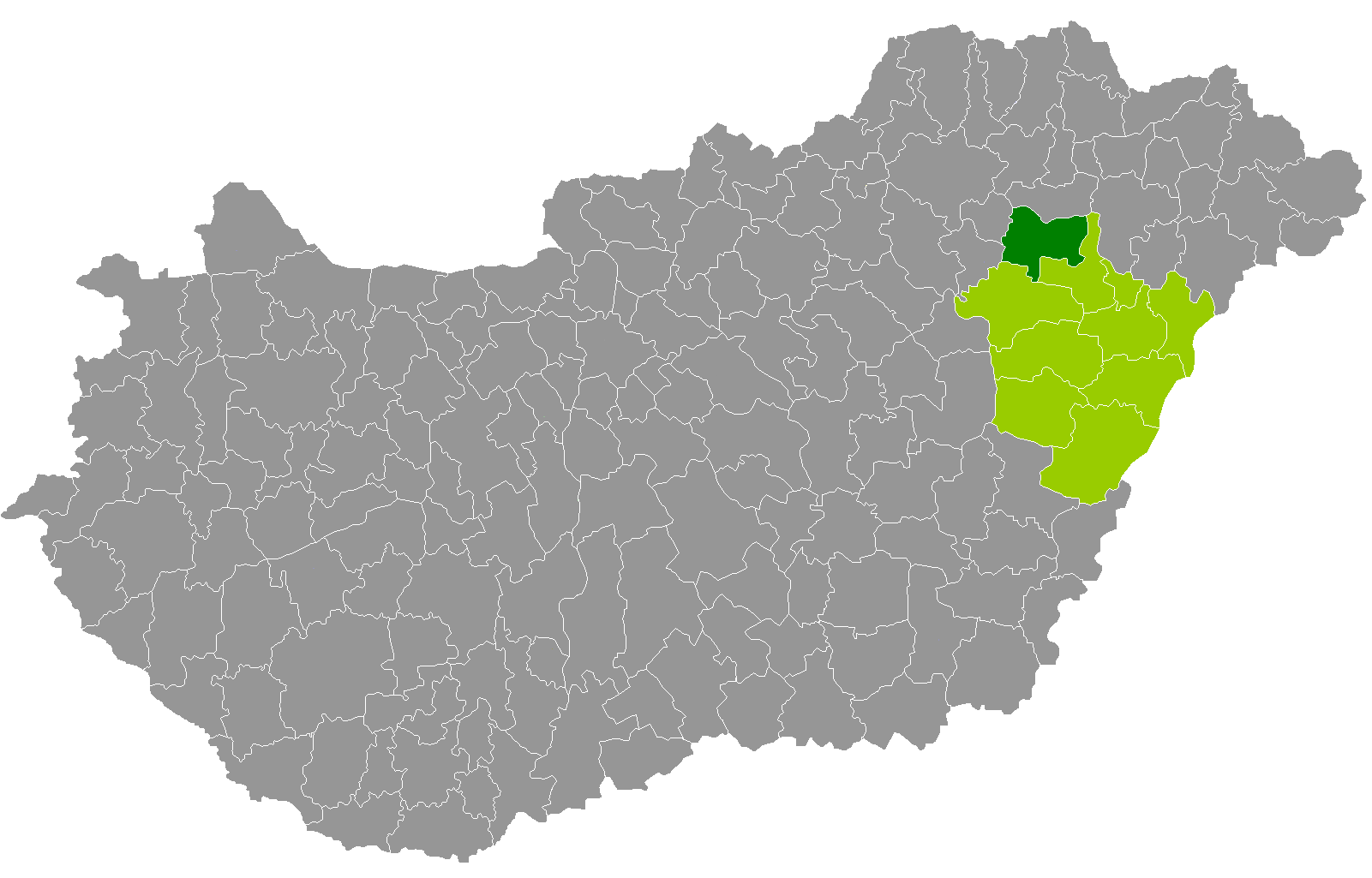
- Hajdúnánás District within Hungary and Hajdú-Bihar County.
- Coordinates: 47.84°N 21.43°E
- Country: Hungary
- County: Hajdú-Bihar
- District seat: Hajdúnánás

Area
  - Total: 547.27 km^{2} (211.30 sq mi)
  - Rank: 6th in Hajdú-Bihar

Population (2011 census)
  - Total: 29,614
  - Rank: 8th in Hajdú-Bihar
  - Density: 54/km^{2} (140/sq mi)

Hajdúnánás (Hungarian: Hajdúnánási járás) is a district in north-western part of Hajdú-Bihar County. Hajdúnánás is also the name of the town where the district seat is found. The district is located in the Northern Great Plain Statistical Region. This district is a part of Hajdúság historical and geographical region.

== Geography ==
Hajdúnánás District borders with Tiszavasvári District (Szabolcs-Szatmár-Bereg County) to the north, Hajdúböszörmény District to the southeast, Balmazújváros District to the south, Mezőcsát District and Tiszaújváros District (Borsod-Abaúj-Zemplén County) to the west. The number of the inhabited places in Hajdúnánás District is 6.

== Municipalities ==
The district has 2 towns and 4 villages. (ordered by population, as of 1 January 2012)

- Folyás (328)
- Görbeháza (2,402)
- **Hajdúnánás** (16,975) – district seat
- **Polgár** (7,915)
- Tiszagyulaháza (705)
- Újtikos (907)

The bolded municipalities are cities.

== Demographics ==
Religion in Hajdúnánás District (2011 census)
1. Catholic Church (20.7%)
2. Greek Catholicism (1.90%)
3. Calvinism (21.8%)
4. Other religions (0.90%)
5. Non-religious (29.8%)
6. Atheists (0.70%)
7. Undeclared (24.2%)

In 2011, it had a population of 29,614 and the population density was 54/km².

Year	County population	Change
2011	29,614	n/a

=== Ethnicity ===
Besides the Hungarian majority, the main minorities are the Roma (approx. 1,000) and German (100).

Total population (2011 census): 29,614
Ethnic groups (2011 census): Identified themselves: 26,934 persons:

- Hungarians: 25,755 (95.62%)
- Gypsies: 851 (3.16%)
- Others and indefinable: 328 (1.22%)

Approx. 3,000 persons in Hajdúnánás District did not declare their ethnic group at the 2011 census.

=== Religion ===
Religious adherence in the county according to 2011 census:

- Catholic – 6,698 (Roman Catholic – 6,141; Greek Catholic – 555);
- Reformed – 6,463;
- other religions – 268;
- Non-religious – 8,833;
- Atheism – 219;
- Undeclared – 7,133.

== Gallery ==
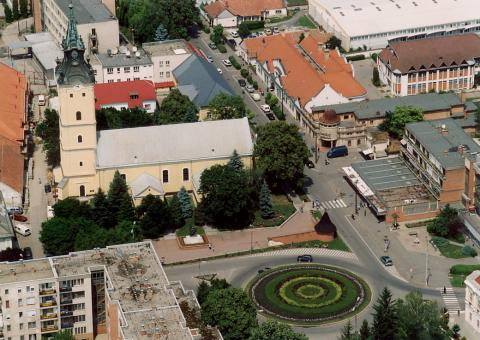
Hajdúnánás, the district seat

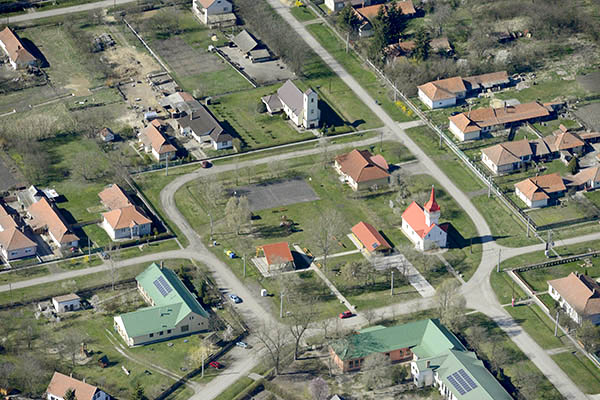
Aerial view of Újtikos

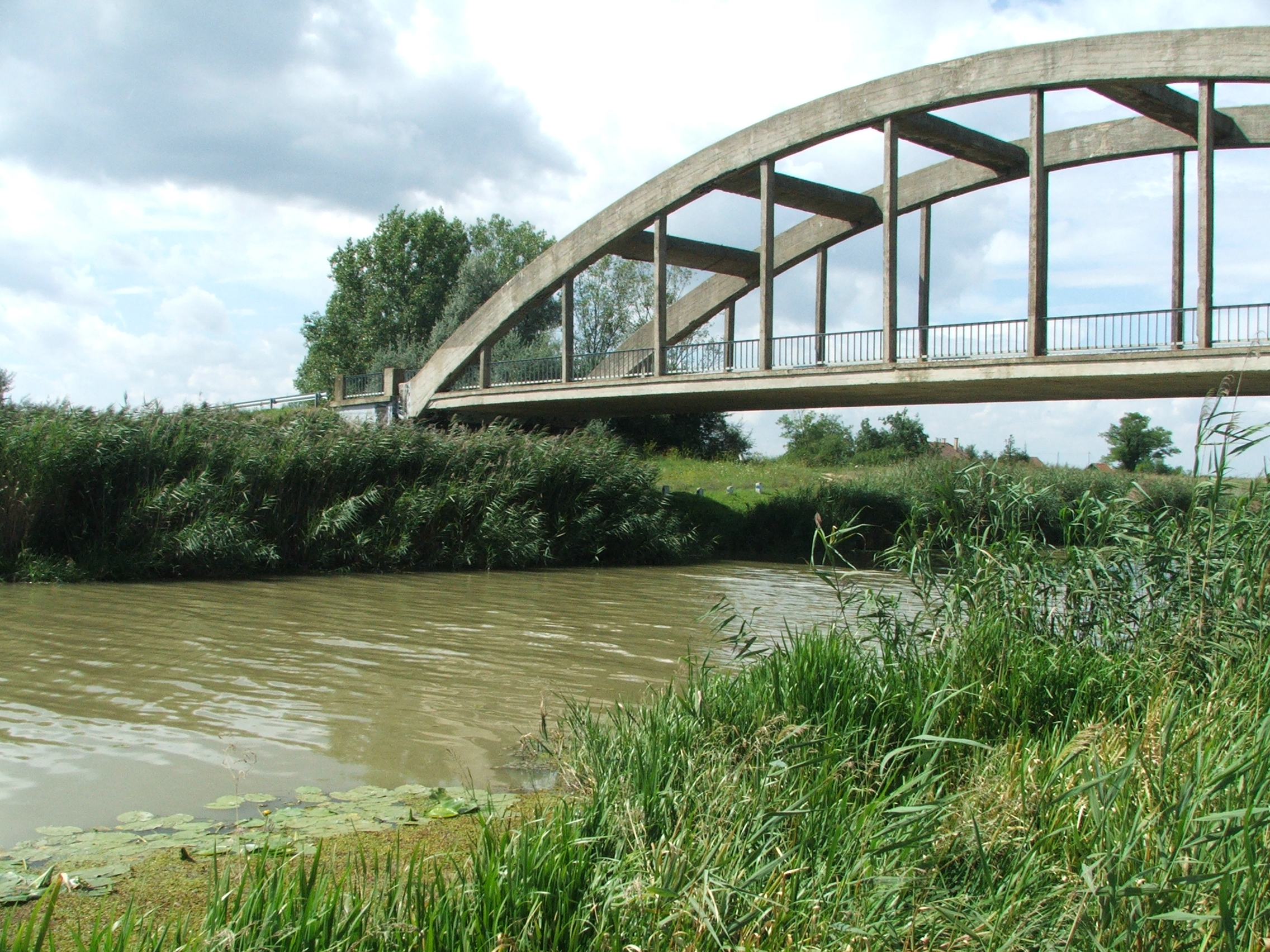
Bridge over Keleti Canal near Hajdúnánás

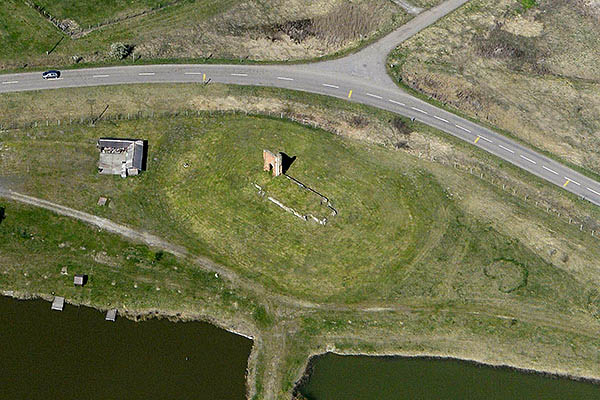
Church ruins of Folyás

== See also ==
- List of cities and towns of Hungary
