= List of spa towns in Hungary =

There are number of spa towns in Hungary. Between the oldest and most visited are the spas of Budapest, Hévíz, Hajdúszoboszló, Bükfürdő, Sárvár and Zalakaros. In 2011 the Hungarian spas were visited by around 700,000 guests, of whom around half were foreigners, mainly from Austria, Germany and Russia.

== List ==
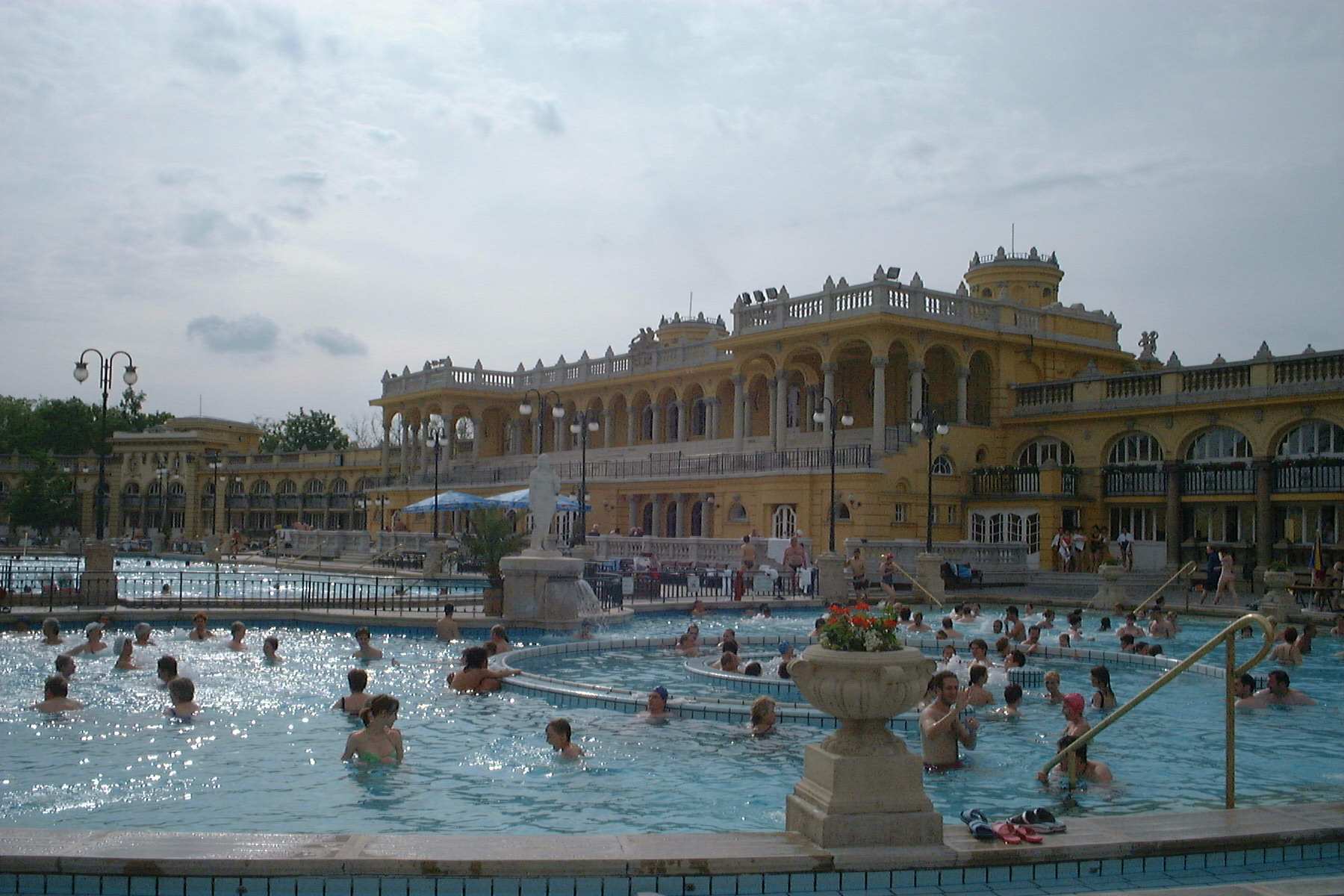
Széchenyi thermal bath in Budapest.

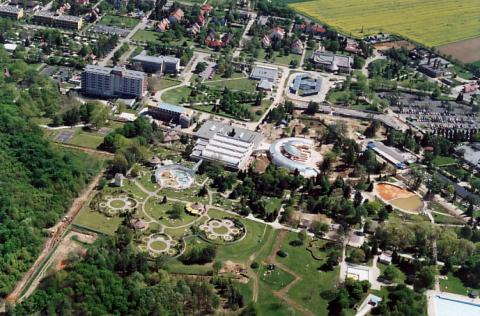
Aerial photo from Bükfürdő.

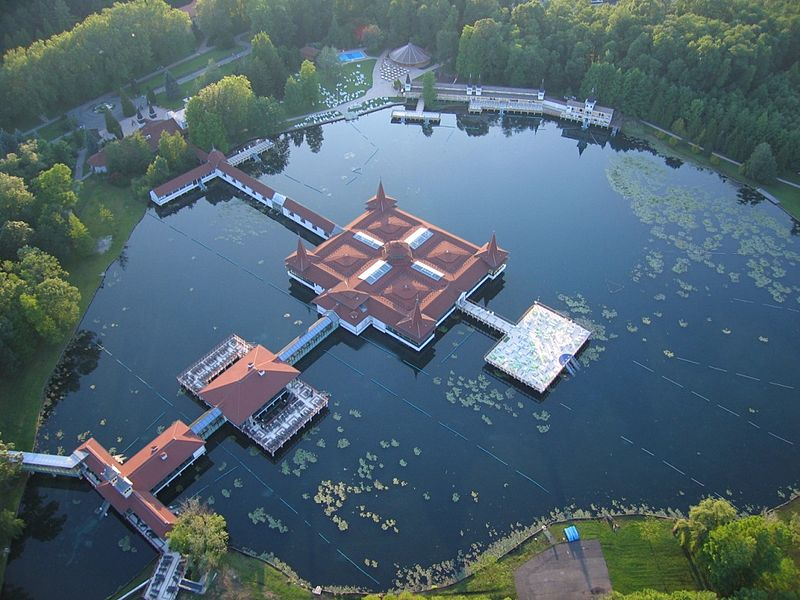
Lake Hévíz, the second largest thermal lake in the world.

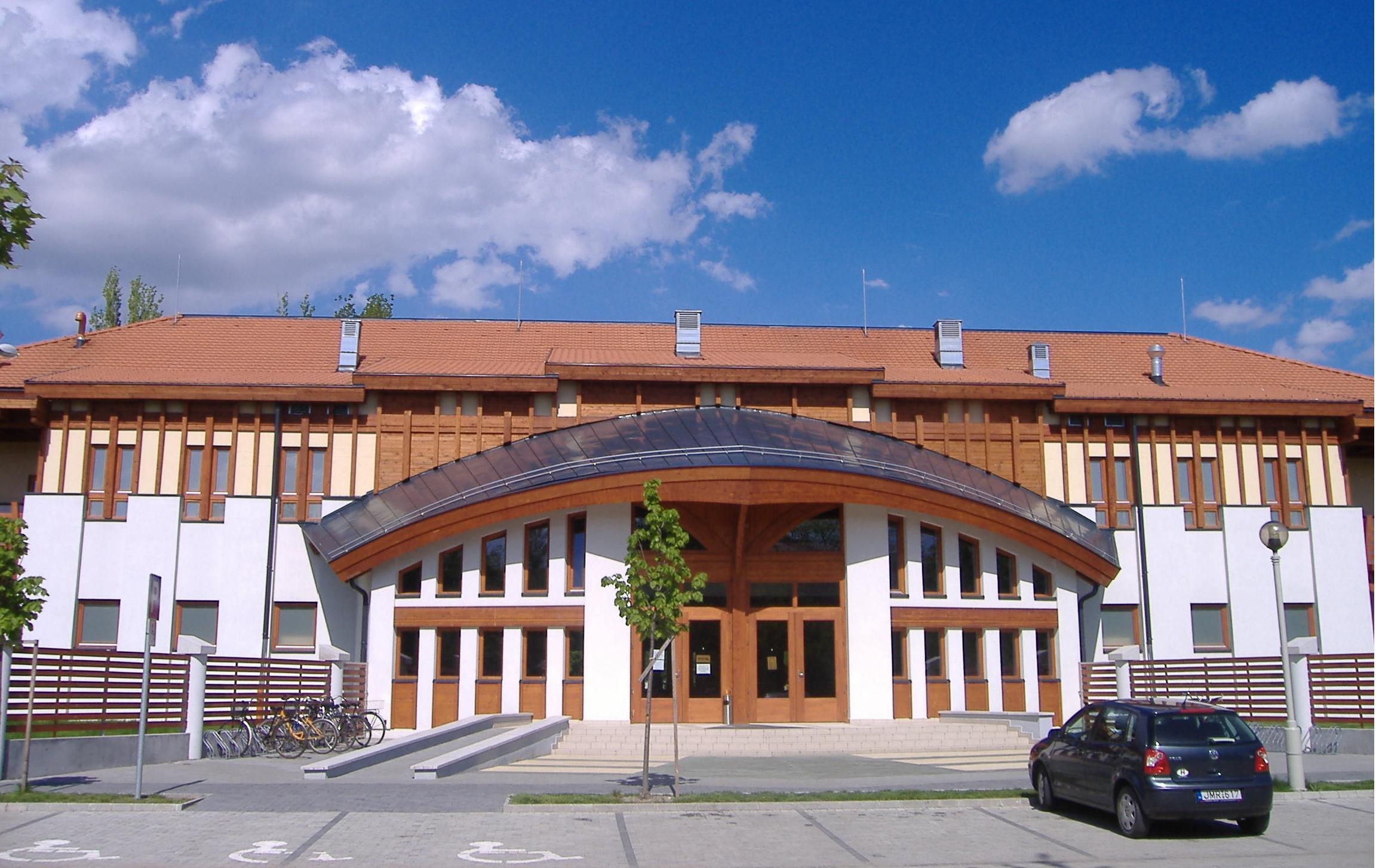
Main entrance of Makó Thermal Baths.

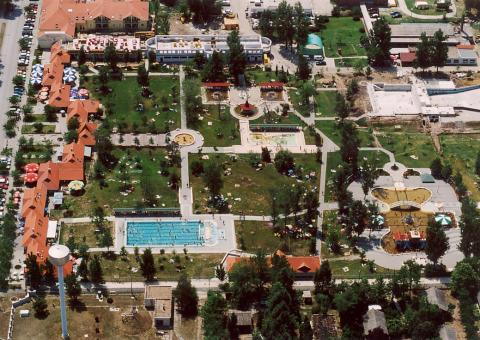
Aerial photo from Cserkeszőlő Spa.

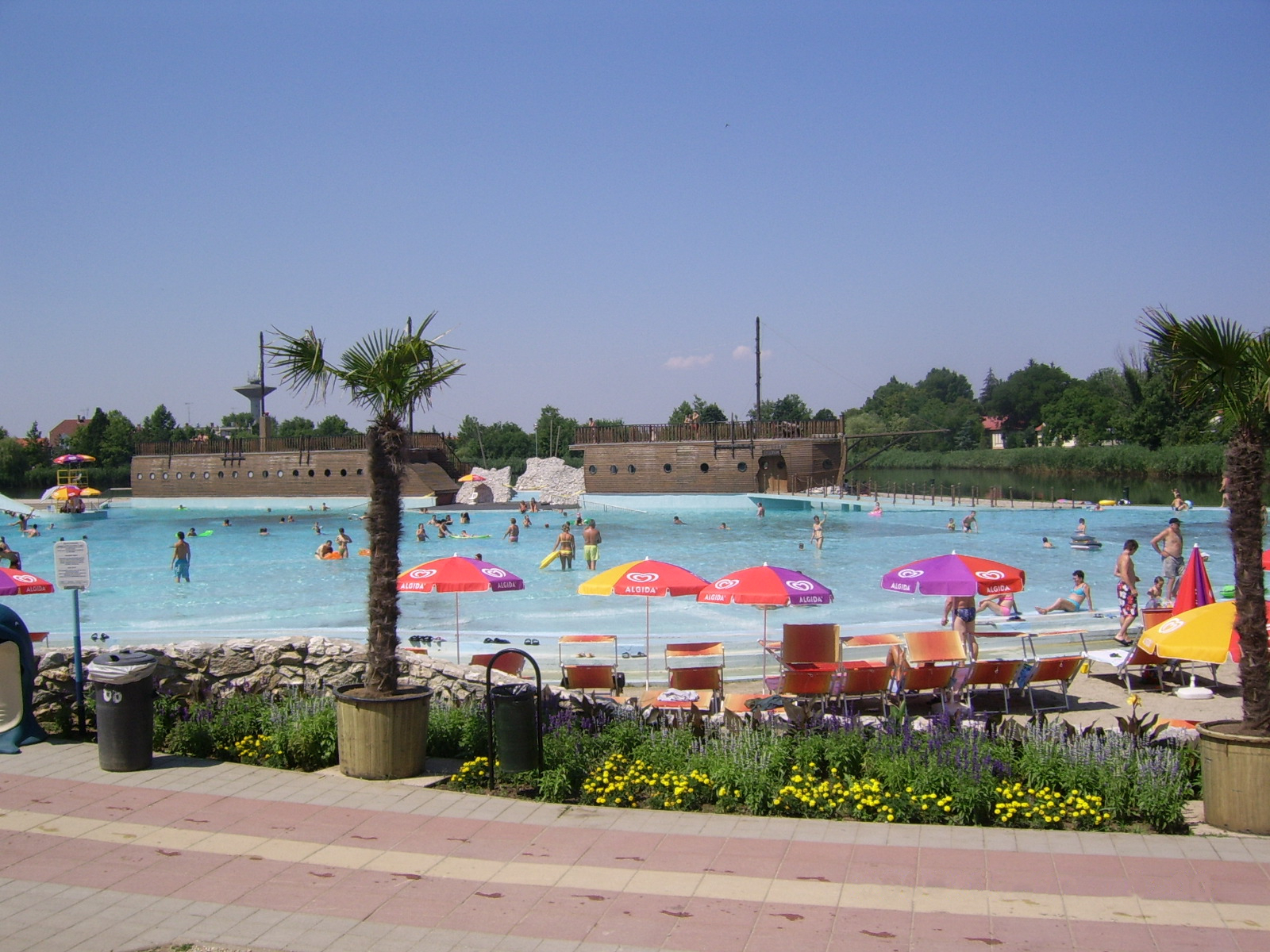
Spa in Hajdúszoboszló.

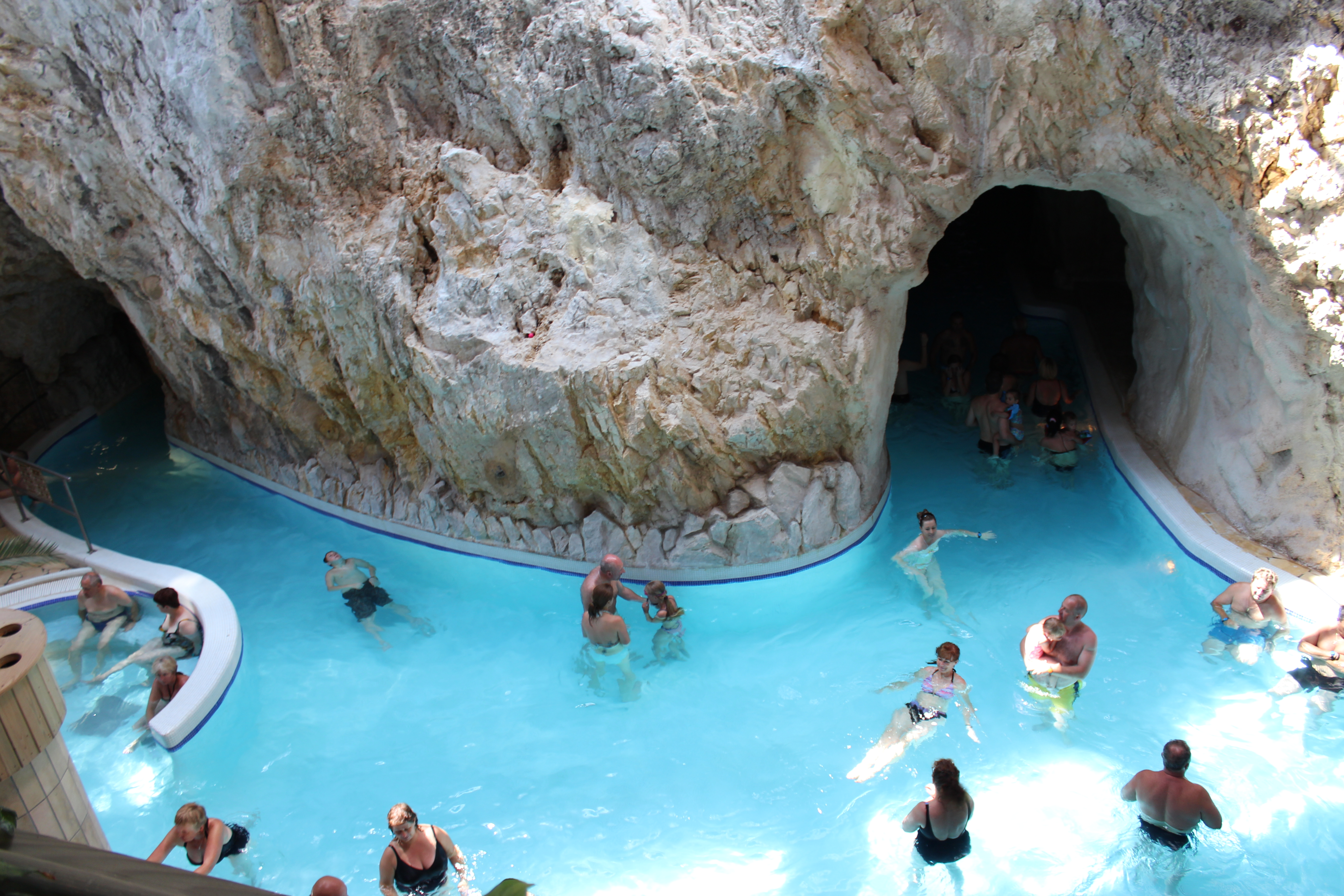
Behind the entrance of Cave Bath.

The following is a list of spa towns in Hungary.^{[a]}

- Budapest:
  - Gellért Baths
  - Király Baths
  - Rác Thermal Bath
  - Rudas Baths
  - Széchenyi thermal bath
- Győr-Moson-Sopron County:
  - Balf
  - Hegykő
  - Kapuvár
  - Lipót
  - Mosonmagyaróvár
- Vas County:
  - Bük (Bükfürdő)
  - Körmend
  - Sárvár
  - Szombathely
- Zala County:
  - Alsópáhok
  - Hévíz
  - Kehidakustány
  - Keszthely
  - Zalakaros
- Komárom-Esztergom County:
  - Esztergom
  - Komárom
  - Tata
- Veszprém County:
  - Balatonfüred
  - Pápa
  - Tapolca
- Somogy County:
  - Nagyatád
- Tolna County:
  - Tamási
- Baranya County:
  - Harkány
  - Szigetvár
- Bács-Kiskun County:
  - Kiskunhalas
  - Kunszentmiklós
  - Tiszakécske
  - Lakitelek (Tőserdő)
- Csongrád-Csanád County:
  - Algyő
  - Csongrád
  - Szeged (Kiskundorozsma)
  - Makó
  - Mórahalom
  - Szentes
- Békés County:
  - Gyomaendrőd
  - Orosháza (Gyopárosfürdő)
  - Gyula
  - Szarvas
- Jász-Nagykun-Szolnok County:
  - Berekfürdő
  - Cserkeszőlő
  - Jászapáti
  - Kisújszállás
  - Martfű
  - Mezőtúr
  - Tiszaörs
  - Túrkeve
- Hajdú-Bihar County:
  - Balmazújváros
  - Debrecen
  - Hajdúböszörmény
  - Hajdúszoboszló
- Szabolcs-Szatmár-Bereg County:
  - Fehérgyarmat
  - Kisvárda
  - Nyíregyháza (Sóstóhegy)
  - Vásárosnamény
- Borsod-Abaúj-Zemplén County:
  - Bogács
  - Mezőkövesd (Zsóry Bath)
  - Miskolc (Miskolctapolca)
  - Tiszaújváros
- Heves County:
  - Bükkszék
  - Egerszalók
  - Mátraderecske
  - Parád (Parádfürdő)

== Statistics ==
Most visitors staying in Hungary on short term basis (not counting visitors staying outside commercial accommodation and day trip visitors) are from the following countries of nationality:

=== Total tourist traffic ===
Rank	Bath	No. of guest nights
1	Hévíz, Zala	990,980
2	Hajdúszoboszló, Hajdú-Bihar	719,131
3	Bükfürdő, Vas	655,801
4	Sárvár, Vas	444,988
5	Zalakaros, Zala	436,454
6	Gyula, Békés	238,735
7	Harkány, Baranya	156,102

=== Domestic tourist traffic ===
Rank	Bath	No. of guest nights
1	Hajdúszoboszló, Hajdú-Bihar	471,077
2	Hévíz, Zala	344,982
3	Zalakaros, Zala	327,459
4	Bükfürdő, Vas	273,939
5	Gyula, Békés	223,146
6	Sárvár, Vas	173,754
7	Egerszalók, Heves	100,477

=== Foreign tourist traffic ===
Rank	Bath	No. of guest nights
1	Hévíz, Zala	645,998
2	Bükfürdő, Vas	381,862
3	Sárvár, Vas	271,234
4	Hajdúszoboszló, Hajdú-Bihar	248,054
5	Zalakaros, Zala	108,995
6	Hegykő, Győr-Moson-Sopron	71,794
7	Harkány, Baranya	59,631

== See also ==
- Tourism in Hungary
- List of spa towns

== Notes and references ==
Notes:

a.	In Hungarian, word for spa (fürdő) is almost always a part of the fürdő's name. or the more archaic bath (füred), spa town (fürdőváros) or bathing place (fürdőhely) implies a spa town.
