= Hungarian motorcycle Grand Prix =

Motorcycling event

Coordinates: 47°34′44″N 19°14′55″E

Hungarian Grand Prix

Grand Prix motorcycle racing
- Venue: Balaton Park Circuit (2025–2026); Hungaroring (1990, 1992)
- First race: 1990
- Last race: 2026
- Most wins (rider): Mattia Casadei, Marc Márquez, Máximo Quiles (2)
- Most wins (manufacturer): Ducati (4)

The Hungarian motorcycle Grand Prix was a motorcycling event that was part of the Grand Prix motorcycle racing World Championship.

== History ==
Hungaroring, which held Grand Prix in 1990 and 1992

The first Hungarian Grand Prix was held in 1990 on the Hungaroring and was the maiden win of Mick Doohan. Before the start of the race, there was a discussion whether or not the race should continue for the 500cc class due to the relatively poor condition of the circuit. The temperatures that day were very warm and the asphalt was bumpy, causing riders to break out in a discussion over cancelling the event. Eventually an agreement was reached but the night before, a thunderstorm soaked the circuit. Now the circuit was not only bumpy but also dangerous due to it being very slippery, causing the riders to erupt in discussions once more. However, after the sun came out, the track dried up and was cleaned by the marshalls. The riders then opted to start the race, deeming the conditions safe enough. However, at least five reconnaissance laps were held before starting the race. After the race, the management council of the FIM refused to keep the Hungarian GP, as well as the Belgian round, on the calendar for next year. This was mainly because of the serious organisational problems which had plagued the race. The riders also were generally unhappy with the circuit and complainted that the circuit was more suited for Formula 1 due to its barriers, the circuit disappeared from the calendar in 1991. The circuit had to undergo work to improve things before 31 December 1990 in order to reappear on the calendar in the future.

After an absence of one year, the circuit reappeared on the calendar in 1992 after the IRTA and Bernie Ecclestone got more influence in the sport over the FIM during the FIM–IRTA war. Ecclestone personally contracted the circuit and put the dates on the calendar and one of his wishes was for more "F1 styled circuits" to appear on the grand prix motorcycling calendar, Hungary being one of them. The race was held in an originally wet track but as it dried up, riders went into the pits to change bikes and the race was eventually won by Eddie Lawson on the Cagiva – the first win for the Italian team. After 1992, the race once again disappeared from the calendar after Ecclestone focused his interest completely on Formula 1 again and a preference for F1 cars to race on the circuit instead. A new race has not been held in Hungary since then.

=== Cancelled Revival at Balatonring ===
In 2008, new plans were laid out to bring back grand prix motorcycle racing to Hungary. The race were to be held at the new Balatonring circuit for the 2009 season. The Balatonring would be specifically made for motorcycle racing and the first grand prix was set to be held on the 20th of September 2009, with a contract that agreed to host the race for at least five years. Construction on the track by the Spanish construction company Sedesa began on 6 November 2008 when the first stone was laid and a time capsule, as well as the Hungarian and Spanish flags, were buried. The event was attended by many local officials of the Sávoly region, one of them being Gordon Bajnai, as well as 2007 125cc world champion Gábor Talmácsi and his then team manager Jorge Martínez as he was one of the driving forces behind the project. The total project was estimated to cost 80 million Euro (64 million U.S. Dollars) with the racing facility projected to draw 100.000 tourists and generate a revenue of 2 billion Forint or 7.75 million Euro's at the time during its first year of operation. Worldwide Circuit Management and Magyar Turizmus have established a joint venture relationship where 30% of the venue is owned by WCM and 70 by the Hungarian Tourism Agency.

However, progress on the circuit was very slow due to the 2008 financial crisis which caused the Spanish construction industry to be plunged into an economic meltdown and plummeting the value of the Hungarian Forint as well. Problems related to acquiring the necessary permits were also present, halting the work that Sedesa was doing. Only the clearing and levelling of the land had been done by this time and this caused the Balatonring organisers to request the subsequent removal of the venue from the calendar on 13 May 2009. The reason for the delay was because of the 2008 financial crisis and a cold winter. The initial reports were that the grand prix had been postponed to 2010, scheduling the race to be held on 19 September 2010, the organisers and circuit owners being confident that the circuit would be finished in time. When a British tourist went over to Lake Balaton for a vacation in August 2009, he reported to crash.net that the surroundings of the track are barren, that the locals in the village of Sávoly were excited and that he personally was disappointed that the circuit itself was flat, comparing it to the more hilly Snetterton Circuit. In November 2009, The Budapest Times reported that Sedesa was 'almost certain' to receive a 50 million Euro (15.3 billion Forint) loan from the state-owned Hungarian Development Bank, which was necessary to finish the project by the then delayed deadline of August 2020. The organisers asked for the loan earlier in the year and as the approval process was longer than expected, the company began construction at its own risk at the beginning of October 2009. The government could guarantee of up to 80% of the proposed 50 million Euro loan but, in return, the contract with Dorna Sports had to be extended until 2019 – the previous contract secured Hungarian races until 2013 – so that the loan could be approved. Once the circuit itself was to be completed, a logistics centre and luxury hotel were also planned to be built after. The cost of the entire project was still estimated to be around 80 to 90 million Euro's, but now the 74.7 million Euro government support along with the loan guarantee had significantly driven up cost by now.

The project then got underway until early March 2010, when the anti-corruption organization Transparency International and the Hungarian Civil Liberties Union called for the project to be stopped. This was because they had concerns over the lack of oversight of the public funds. The head of Grupo Milton Management Zrt, the company responsible for the management of the Balatonring project, was convicted on charges of corruption in 1995 and the feasibility study of the project had not only not been published, but journalists were outright refused to access the study, even though they were well within their right to do so as they could make applications under Hungary's freedom of information act. After pressure from the groups, then Prime Minister Bajnai ordered the Ministry of National Development and Economy to make the feasibility study of the project public. The groups then discovered that the heads of Hungary's finance department opposed funding of the Balatonring circuit. The atmosphere surrounding the project even caused Tamás Suchman, the head of the Balatonring Development Agency, to resign on Thursday 4 March 2010. "I do not want to participate in such a project where every kind of accusation has been started, from blackmail to the uncertainty of recouping the investment.", said Suchman in a report by Hungarian business website RealDeal. On 13 March 2010, the future of the Balatonring was once again unsure after the Hungarian Development Bank rejected the loan offer to complete the circuit, citing that the loan was too risky. The original terms of the loan agreement stated that 70% of the funding would be provided by the state in return for receiving a 30% stake in the circuit itself. However, the calculations which were required to measure said return on the investment had not been made, making it impossible to judge the value of investing in construction of the venue. A statement issued by the MFB said that the bank had negotiated with the investor about the business risks of the venue, but that the investor could not accept the conditions which the MFB had put on the loan. Because of this, construction firm Savoly Motorcentrum Fejleszto will have to fund the construction on their own as they will not be receiving any funding from the state. The Hungarian government was still committed to the construction of the Balatonring but was now only prepared to fund the MotoGP round itself. Five days later, on 18 March 2010, it was confirmed that the reserve race called the Aragon Grand Prix, held at the MotorLand Aragón, was going to replace the Hungarian Grand Prix. The reason was that the construction on the circuit could not be completed on time. As there had not been stated any future date, all hopes for a future Hungarian Grand Prix on the Balatonring were gone by now and construction ceased as Worldwide Circuit Management withdrew from the project entirely. The circuit had gathered a total of 13.5 million Euro (16 million U.S. Dollar) of debt by then whilst only the earthworks of the circuit was completed, the water, sewer and electricity network were fully developed and the slanted design of the buildings and the track structure remained.

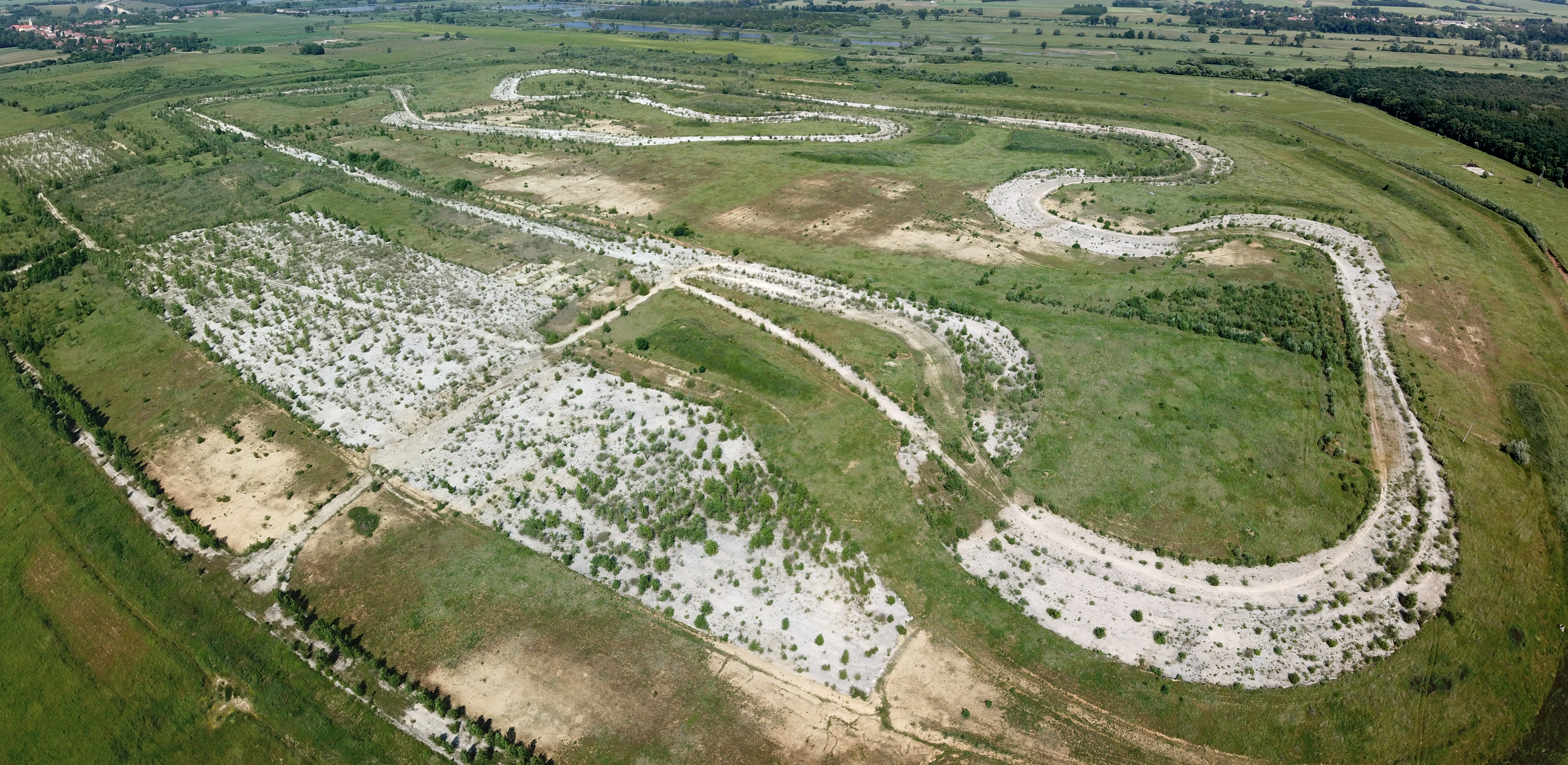
A panorama of the abandoned Balatonring circuit and the paddock area in 2018.

In the years after 2010, little was done on the original place of the Balatonring. In 2012, the outline of the track couldn't even be seen due to the weeds and grass growing back where the once barren places were created during the construction process. In that same year, the project became bankrupt and an auction had been set up to sell the circuit but to no success. In 2016, a Google Maps picture shows that the layout of the track is kept clean once again, hoping that the government could find a new investor in the future. Reports that the site was used as an illegal dumping ground and that the foundation stone was stolen also emerged. In 2020, Tibor Schuller, mayor of Sávoly, hoped that the government would at least finish the original circuit because, in terms of its status, the track is still registered as a state-owned investment and the surrounding infrastructure is also good. However, that seems impossible for multiple reasons; the expectations of the paddock building and the central infrastructure no longer meet the area, the line drawing is already considered obsolete, there is already a similar track on the race calendar meaning that the rights holder would not support the location of the venue, there is not enough space in the area for other facilities that allow multifunctionality, existing earthworks would have to be completely dismantled and redone, increasing the costs even more, the noise emission standards have become stricter and don't allow for the previously planned track site to be built since it is so close to populated areas, the changed legal environment since the original construction prescribes significantly stricter environmental and construction regulations and the possible implementation of the project would also lead to significant environmental pollution, the destruction of Natura 2000 sites in the area and endanger the unique wildlife of Kis-Balaton.

== Revival ==
In 2017, talks for the revival of the Hungarian round emerged again. The original plans were to bring back the race to the Hungaroring for the 2018 season, but for that to happen the circuit had to undergo major modifications to bring it up to modern safety standards. The renovation, which began in October 2018 after the venue secured crucial state funding, focussed on the altering of some turns and run-off areas as well as the construction of a new grandstand, commentary boxes and a new pit complex. A museum and a visitor centre was also going to be built. The upgrades are done to make the circuit eligible for a possible return for motorcycle racing. Once the project is underway, the circuit's Chief Executive Officer Zsolt Gyulay confirmed that they will hold discussions with the FIM to see if it's possible to host MotoGP on the track again. Gyulay also admitted that the Hungarian government would have to be on board for the Hungaroring to host MotoGP, but doesn't expect them to oppose such a decision. However, the talks went nowhere and MotoGP has not gone to the Hungaroring since the initial talks.

On 13 November 2019, it was announced that Dorna Sports had signed a Memorandum of understanding with the government of Hungary to host a Hungarian round at a new circuit for five years, between 2022 and 2026, as long as the race promoter's contract is signed by the end of February 2020. Minister for Innovation and Technology László Palkovics said that he was "very happy to announce MotoGP is set to return to Hungary" and that "a strategy for the development of Hungarian motorsports will be submitted to the government; this strategy will include numerous objectives and measures, and - in addition to success in the sport and its impact on tourism - it is also needed because the industry has a dominant impact on the success of the Hungarian economy.". At the time, no details were given about the new circuit, only that it was likely going to be in the east of the country. Gábor Talmácsi was also excited, saying that "I have always wished to have MotoGP here", that he "worked for six years to try to work out how to bring MotoGP to Hungary, finding all the people to support it who love their motorsport" since his retirement in 2013 and that "This project is my heart".

=== Magyar Nemzetkozi Motodrome ===
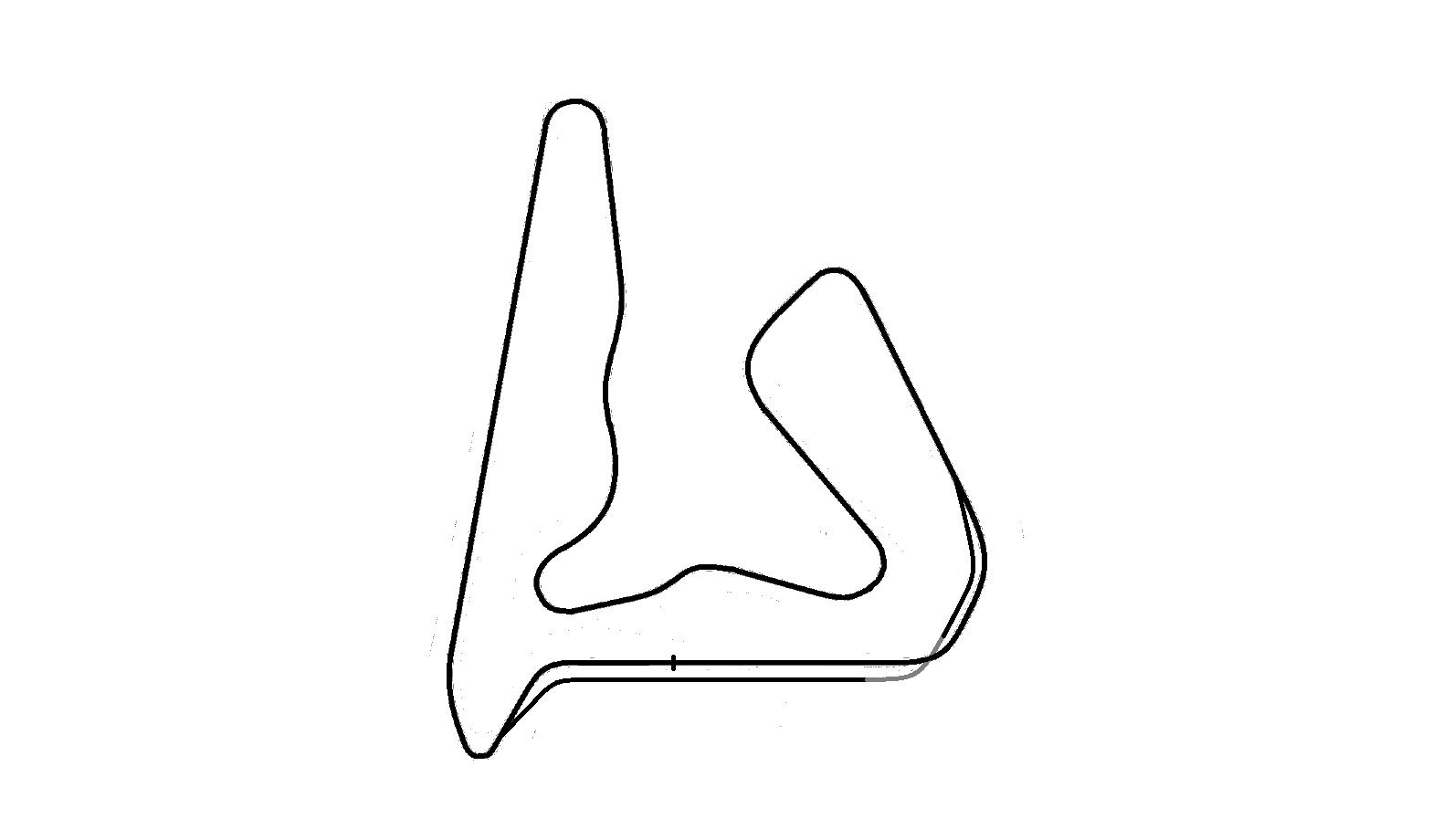
Proposed layout of Magyar Nemzetkozi Motodrome

In February 2020, Budapest Business Journal reported that the Hungaroring is once again being considered as a venue for the 2022 race, a government official said in a response to a query by a Hungarian opposition MP posted on the website of the parliament. Tamás Schanda stated that "A review is also underway on the matter of the suitability of Hungaroring and the related possible construction of a new track. The results of [the review] and the recommendations formulated will be summarised in the national strategy on developing car and motorsport." On 21 June 2020, it was confirmed that Hungary will build a new modern, multifunctional and economically operable racetrack near Hajdúnánás, at the centre of the Debrecen-Miskolc-Nyíregyháza triangle, in the north-eastern part of the country. This track Magyar Nemzetkozi Motodrome would be suitable to host MotoGP, as well as Formula 1 races in the future. The agreement with Dorna Sports would be for eight years but was postponed to 2023. László Palkovics stated at the project launch press conference that the investment, which included the construction of service facilities, a training centre, a conference centre and a hotel, is estimated to cost 65 billion Forint or 186 million Euro. Palkovicz continued, stating that the reason for these big investments result in the prominence of a region and that they want east Hungary to become a new centre of the Hungarian automotive industry after Győr, Kecskemét and Debrecen. "With this investment, eastern Hungary will be more widely known, and it will have a foreseeable positive effect on marketing and tourism for the whole country", Lajos Kósa added. Palkovics mentioned that the Hungarian government has a new strategy concerning motorsport. This included infrastructure developments, education and training, as well as other future options for supporting motorsport and that, in addition to sporting events, road safety training could also be held on the future track. The project was also aimed at helping the country's economy in the long run, which has been affected by the COVID-19 pandemic. The circuit will be designed by the Dromo and Jarno Zaffelli; and on 20 March 2021, the circuit proposal was published. which was about 5.050 km (3.138 mi) length. However, the circuit proposal was halted.

=== Reserve Grand Prix plan in 2024, inclusion of Balaton Park in 2025 ===
In September 2023, it was revealed that Balaton Park Circuit would be planned to be included in the Superbike World Championship in 2024, and it would be also the reserve venue of MotoGP World Championship in the same year before the return of Hungarian motorcycle Grand Prix to Hungaroring in 2025. Instead of Hungaroring, Balaton Park would be included in the calendar to host the MotoGP in August 2025.

== Official names and sponsors ==
- 1990: Magyar Nagydíj (no official sponsor)
- 1992: HB Magyar Nagydíj
- 2025: Michelin Grand Prix of Hungary
- 2026: Grand Prix of Hungary (no official sponsor)

== Winners ==
=== Multiple winners (riders) ===
# Wins	Manufacturer	Wins	
# Wins	Manufacturer	Category	Years won
2	(Italy) Mattia Casadei	MotoE	2025 Race 1, 2025 Race 2
2	(Spain) Máximo Quiles	Moto3	2025, 2026
2	(Spain) Marc Márquez	MotoGP	2025, 2026

=== Multiple winners (manufacturers) ===
# Wins	Manufacturer	Wins	
# Wins	Manufacturer	Category	Years won
4	(Italy) Ducati	MotoGP	2025, 2026
4	(Italy) Ducati	MotoE	2025 Race 1, 2025 Race 2
3	(Japan) Honda	500cc	1990
3	(Japan) Honda	250cc	1992
3	(Japan) Honda	125cc	1990
2	(Austria) KTM	Moto3	2025, 2026
2	(Germany) Kalex	Moto2	2025, 2026

=== By year ===
Year	Track	Moto3		Moto2		MotoGP		Report
Year	Track	Rider	Manufacturer	Rider	Manufacturer	Rider	Manufacturer	Report
2026	Balaton Park	(Spain) Máximo Quiles	KTM	(Spain) Manuel González	Kalex	(Spain) Marc Márquez	Ducati	Report

Year	Track	MotoE				Moto3		Moto2		MotoGP		Report
Year	Track	Race 1		Race 2		Moto3		Moto2		MotoGP		Report
Year	Track	Rider	Manufacturer	Rider	Manufacturer	Rider	Manufacturer	Rider	Manufacturer	Rider	Manufacturer	Report
2025	Balaton Park	(Italy) Mattia Casadei	Ducati	(Italy) Mattia Casadei	Ducati	(Spain) Máximo Quiles	KTM	(Colombia) David Alonso	Kalex	(Spain) Marc Márquez	Ducati	Report

Year	Track	125cc		250cc		500cc		Report
Year	Track	Rider	Manufacturer	Rider	Manufacturer	Rider	Manufacturer	Report
1992	Hungaroring	(Italy) Alessandro Gramigni	Aprilia	(Italy) Luca Cadalora	Honda	(United States) Eddie Lawson	Cagiva	Report
1990	Hungaroring	(Italy) Loris Capirossi	Honda	(United States) John Kocinski	Yamaha	(Australia) Mick Doohan	Honda	Report
