= Éva Göröghné Bocskai =

Hungarian politician

Member of the National Assembly
- Incumbent
- Assumed office 9 May 2026
- Preceded by: István Tiba
- Constituency: Hajdú-Bihar 6th

Personal details
- Party: TISZA

Éva Göröghné Bocskai is a Hungarian politician who was elected member of the National Assembly in 2026. She has served as mayor of Hajdúböszörmény since 2024.
