= Magyar Nemzetkozi Motodrome =

Race track in Mogyoród, Hungary

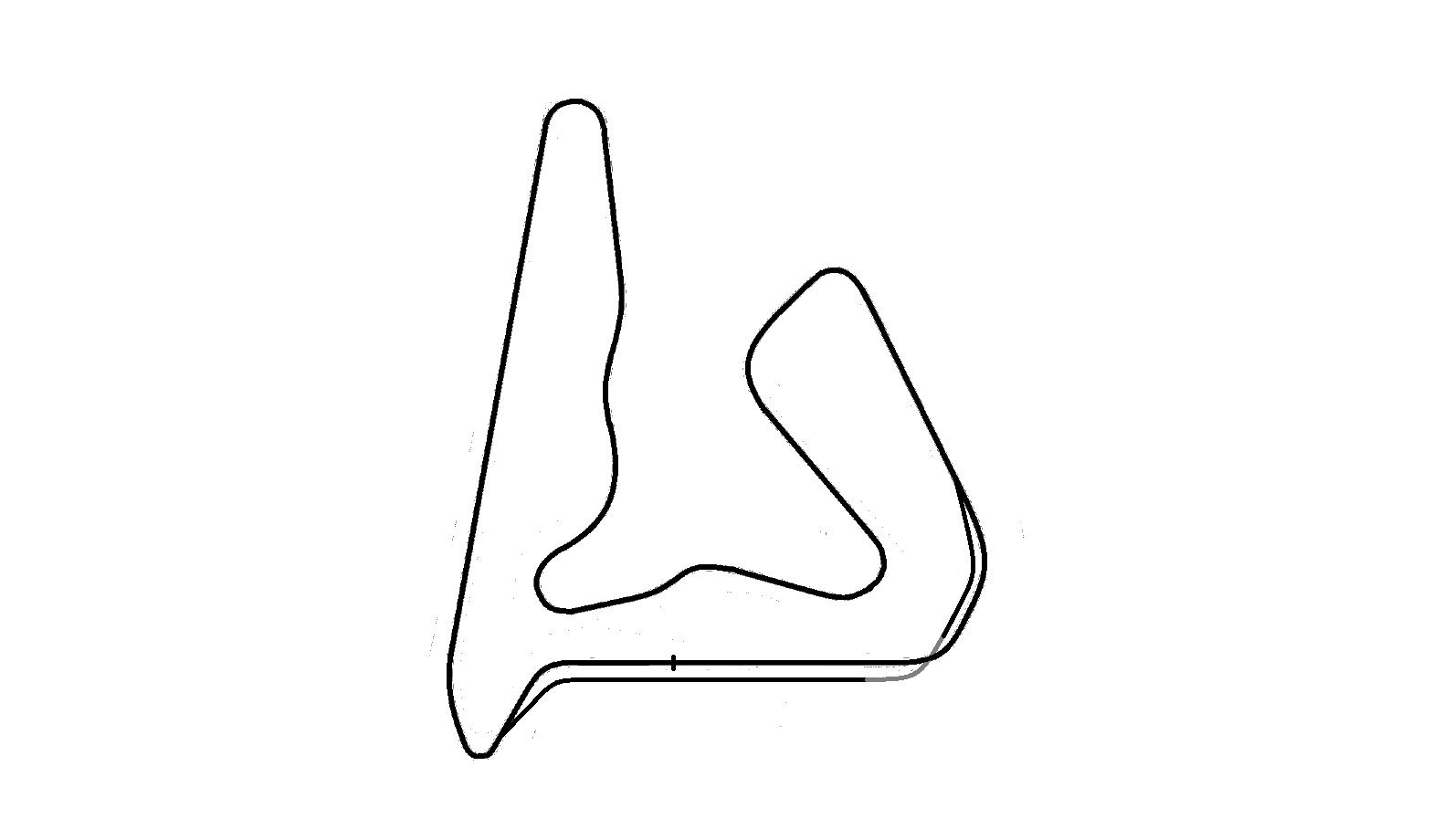
- Location: Hajdúnánás, Debrecen, Hajdú-Bihar County, Hungary
- Broke ground: not yet broke ground
- Opened: not yet opened
- Architect: Jarno Zaffelli

Grand Prix Circuit
- Length: 5.050 km (3.138 mi)
- Turns: 15

Outer Loop
- Length: 3.615 km (2.246 mi)
- Turns: 11

Inner Loop
- Length: 1.659 km (1.031 mi)
- Turns: 6

The Magyar Nemzetkozi Motodrome (English: Hungarian National Motodrome) was a planned motorsport racetrack project in Hajdúnánás, Debrecen, Hajdú-Bihar County, Hungary. Currently not even under construction, the circuit was designed to host the Hungarian motorcycle Grand Prix from 2023 onwards.

== Description ==
After the failed Balatonring project, Hungary would once again try to build a circuit for MotoGP, this time to be built in Hajdúnánás near Debrecen. Construction began in the second quarter of 2021 to be built and was to be homologated by 2023, the year the Hungarian motorcycle Grand Prix had been expected to return. That grand prix would be postponed by a year.

The new track was planned to have a 5.050 km (3.138 mi) long layout with 15 turns and multiple elevation changes. Two other shorter layouts were also planned to be built.

However, in September 2023, it was announced that MotoGP will be planning to return Hungaroring from 2025, and include Balaton Park Circuit as a reserve circuit for 2024 without mentioning this circuit.
