= Hot spring =

Spring produced by the emergence of geothermally heated groundwater

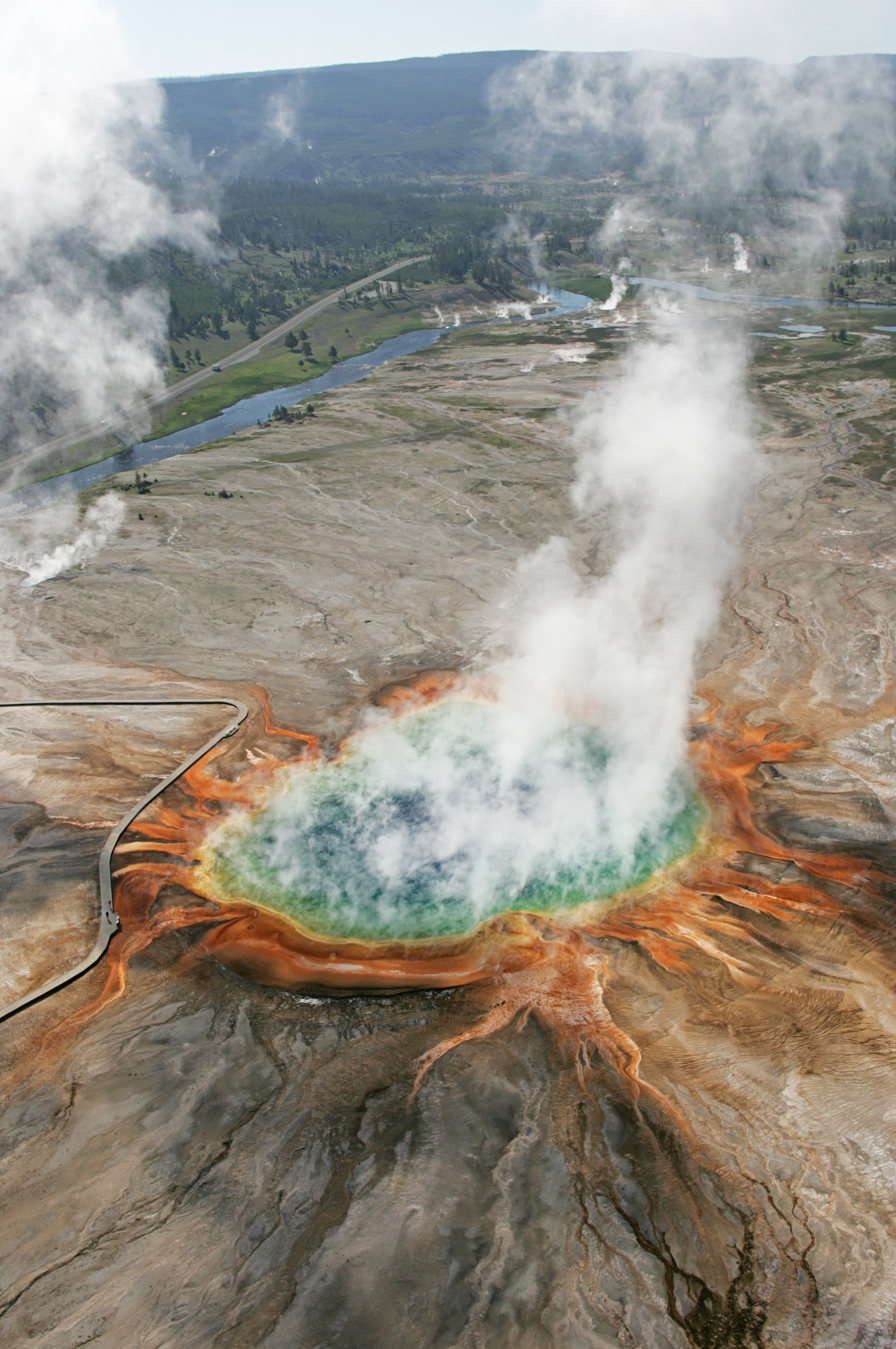
Grand Prismatic Spring and Midway Geyser Basin in Yellowstone National Park

A hot spring, thermal spring, hydrothermal spring, or geothermal spring is a spring produced by the emergence of geothermally heated groundwater onto the surface of the Earth. The groundwater is heated either by shallow bodies of magma (molten rock) or by circulation through faults to hot rock deep in the Earth's crust.

Hot spring water often contains large amounts of dissolved minerals. The chemistry of hot springs ranges from acid sulfate springs with a pH as low as 0.8, to alkaline chloride springs saturated with silica, to bicarbonate springs saturated with carbon dioxide and carbonate minerals. Some springs also contain abundant dissolved iron. The minerals brought to the surface in hot springs often feed communities of extremophiles, microorganisms adapted to extreme conditions, and it is possible that life on Earth had its origin in hot springs.

Humans have made use of hot springs for bathing, relaxation, or medical therapy for thousands of years. However, some are hot enough that immersion can be harmful, leading to scalding and potentially death.

== Definitions ==
There is no universally accepted definition of a hot spring. For example, one can find the phrase hot spring defined as

- any spring heated by geothermal activity
- a spring with water temperatures above its surroundings
- a natural spring with water temperature above human body temperature (normally about 37 °C (99 °F))

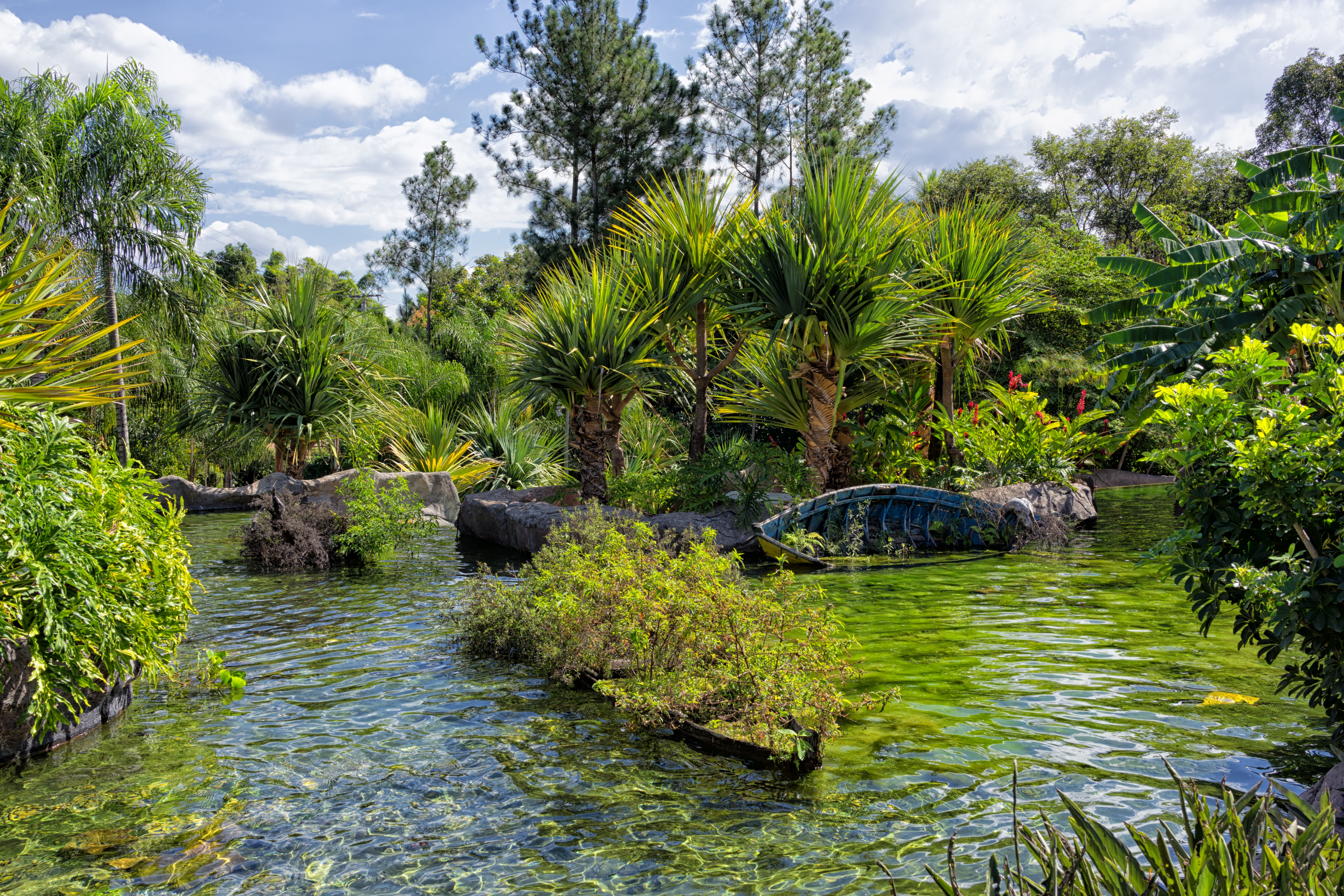
Hot water springs in Rio Quente, Brazil

- a natural spring of water whose temperature is greater than 21 °C (70 °F)
- a type of thermal spring whose water temperature is usually 6 to 8 °C (11 to 14 °F) or more above mean air temperature.
- a spring with water temperatures above 50 °C (122 °F)

The related term "warm spring" is defined as a spring with water temperature less than a hot spring by many sources, although Pentecost et al. (2003) suggest that the phrase "warm spring" is not useful and should be avoided. In 1923, Menzier proposed that a warm spring be defined as a thermal spring where the water is below that of the human body, but above that of the mean air temperature around the spring, though this definition is contested.

== Sources of heat ==
Water issuing from a hot spring is heated geothermally, that is, with heat produced from the Earth's mantle. This takes place in two ways. In areas of high volcanic activity, magma (molten rock) may be present at shallow depths in the Earth's crust. Groundwater is heated by these shallow magma bodies and rises to the surface to emerge at a hot spring. However, even in areas that do not experience volcanic activity, the temperature of rocks within the earth increases with depth. The rate of temperature increase with depth is known as the geothermal gradient. If water percolates deeply enough into the crust, it will be heated as it comes into contact with hot rock. This generally takes place along faults, where shattered rock beds provide easy paths for water to circulate to greater depths.

Much of the heat is created by decay of naturally radioactive elements. An estimated 45 to 90 percent of the heat escaping from the Earth originates from radioactive decay of elements mainly located in the mantle. The major heat-producing isotopes in the Earth are potassium-40, uranium-238, uranium-235, and thorium-232. In areas with no volcanic activity, this heat flows through the crust by a slow process of thermal conduction, but in volcanic areas, the heat is carried to the surface more rapidly by bodies of magma.

The radiogenic heat from the decay of ^{238}U and ^{232}Th are now the major contributors to the earth's internal heat budget.

A hot spring that periodically jets water and steam is called a geyser. In active volcanic zones such as Yellowstone National Park, magma may be present at shallow depths. If a hot spring is connected to a large natural cistern close to such a magma body, the magma may superheat the water in the cistern, raising its temperature above the normal boiling point. The water will not immediately boil, because the weight of the water column above the cistern pressurizes the cistern and suppresses boiling. However, as the superheated water expands, some of the water will emerge at the surface, reducing pressure in the cistern. This allows some of the water in the cistern to flash into steam, which forces more water out of the hot spring. This leads to a runaway condition in which a sizable amount of water and steam are forcibly ejected from the hot spring as the cistern is emptied. The cistern then refills with cooler water, and the cycle repeats.

Geysers require both a natural cistern and an abundant source of cooler water to refill the cistern after each eruption of the geyser. If the water supply is less abundant, so that the water is boiled as fast as it can accumulate and only reaches the surface in the form of steam, the result is a fumarole. If the water is mixed with mud and clay, the result is a mud pot.

An example of a non-volcanic warm spring is Warm Springs, Georgia (frequented for its therapeutic effects by paraplegic U.S. President Franklin D. Roosevelt, who built the Little White House there). Here the groundwater originates as rain and snow (meteoric water) falling on the nearby mountains, which penetrates a particular formation (Hollis Quartzite) to a depth of 3,000 feet (910 m) and is heated by the normal geothermal gradient.

== Chemistry ==
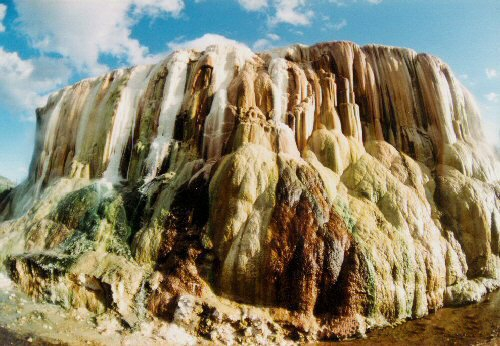
Hammam Maskhoutine in Algeria, an example of a bicarbonate hot spring

Because heated water can hold more dissolved solids than cold water, the water that issues from hot springs often has a very high mineral content, containing everything from calcium to lithium and even radium. The overall chemistry of hot springs varies from alkaline chloride to acid sulfate to bicarbonate to iron-rich, each of which defines an end member of a range of possible hot spring chemistries.

Alkaline chloride hot springs are fed by hydrothermal fluids that form when groundwater containing dissolved chloride salts reacts with silicate rocks at high temperature. These springs have nearly neutral pH but are saturated with silica (SiO_{2}). The solubility of silica depends strongly upon temperature, so upon cooling, the silica is deposited as geyserite, a form of opal (opal-A: SiO_{2}·nH_{2}O). This process is slow enough that geyserite is not all deposited immediately around the vent, but tends to build up a low, broad platform for some distance around the spring opening.

Acid sulfate hot springs are fed by hydrothermal fluids rich in hydrogen sulfide (H_{2}S), which is oxidized to form sulfuric acid, H_{2}SO_{4}. The pH of the fluids is thereby lowered to values as low as 0.8. The acid reacts with rock to alter it to clay minerals, oxide minerals, and a residue of silica.

Bicarbonate hot springs are fed by hydrothermal fluids that form when carbon dioxide (CO_{2}) and groundwater react with carbonate rocks. When the fluids reach the surface, CO_{2} is rapidly lost and carbonate minerals precipitate as travertine, so that bicarbonate hot springs tend to form high-relief structures around their openings.

Iron-rich springs are characterized by the presence of microbial communities that produce clumps of oxidized iron from iron in the hydrothermal fluids feeding the spring.

Some hot springs produce fluids that are intermediate in chemistry between these extremes. For example, mixed acid-sulfate-chloride hot springs are intermediate between acid sulfate and alkaline chloride springs and may form by mixing of acid sulfate and alkaline chloride fluids. They deposit geyserite, but in smaller quantities than alkaline chloride springs.

== Flow rates ==
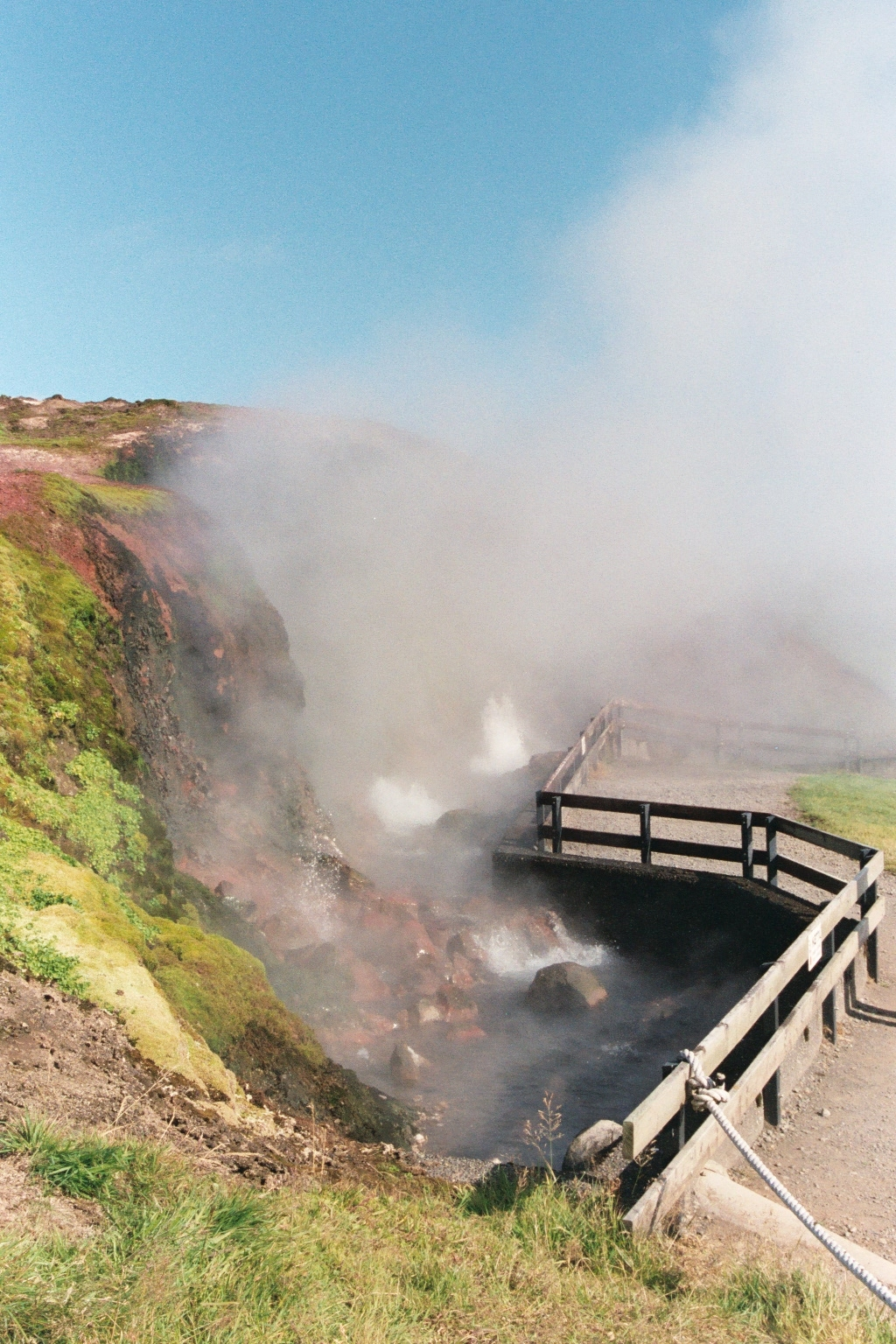
Deildartunguhver, Iceland: the highest flow hot spring in Europe

Hot springs range in flow rate from the tiniest "seeps" to veritable rivers of hot water. Sometimes there is enough pressure that the water shoots upward in a geyser, or fountain.

=== High-flow hot springs ===
There are many claims in the literature about the flow rates of hot springs. There are many more high flow non-thermal springs than geothermal springs. Springs with high flow rates include:

- The Dalhousie Springs complex in Australia had a peak total flow of more than 23,000 liters/second in 1915, giving the average spring in the complex an output of more than 325 liters/second. This has been reduced now to a peak total flow of 17,370 liters/second so the average spring has a peak output of about 250 liters/second.
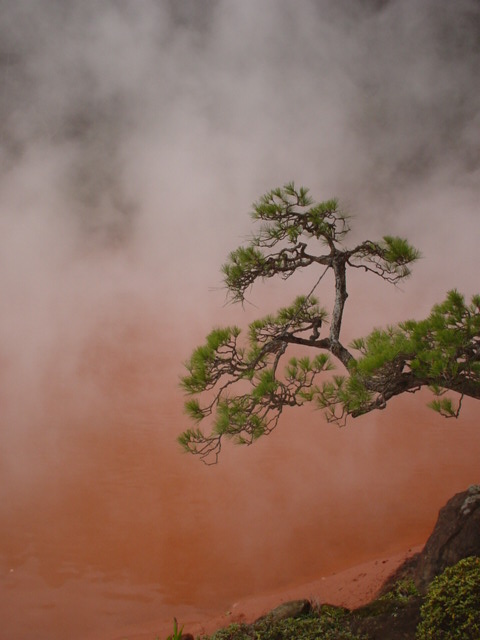
- "Blood Pond" hot spring in Beppu, Japan
  The 2,850 hot springs of Beppu in Japan are the highest flow hot spring complex in Japan. Together the Beppu hot springs produce about 1,592 liters/second, or corresponding to an average hot spring flow of 0.56 liters/second.
- The 303 hot springs of Kokonoe in Japan produce 1,028 liters/second, which gives the average hot spring a flow of 3.39 liters/second.
- Ōita Prefecture has 4,762 hot springs, with a total flow of 4,437 liters/second, so the average hot spring flow is 0.93 liters/second.
- The highest flow rate hot spring in Japan is the Tamagawa Hot Spring in Akita Prefecture, which has a flow rate of 150 liters/second. The Tamagawa Hot Spring feeds a 3 m (9.8 ft) wide stream with a temperature of 98 °C (208 °F).
- The most famous hot springs of Brazil's Caldas Novas ("New Hot Springs" in Portuguese) are tapped by 86 wells, from which 333 liters/second are pumped for 14 hours per day. This corresponds to a peak average flow rate of 3.89 liters/second per well.
- In Florida, there are 33 recognized "magnitude one springs" (having a flow in excess of 2,800 L/s (99 cu ft/s)). Silver Springs, Florida has a flow of more than 21,000 L/s (740 cu ft/s).
- The Excelsior Geyser Crater in Yellowstone National Park yields about 4,000 U.S. gal/min (0.25 m^{3}/s).
- Evans Plunge in Hot Springs, South Dakota has a flow rate of 5,000 U.S. gal/min (0.32 m^{3}/s) of 87 °F (31 °C) spring water. The Plunge, built in 1890, is the world's largest natural warm water indoor swimming pool.
- The hot spring of Saturnia, Italy with around 500 liters a second
- Lava Hot Springs in Idaho has a flow of 130 liters/second.
- Glenwood Springs in Colorado has a flow of 143 liters/second.
- Elizabeth Springs in western Queensland, Australia might have had a flow of 158 liters/second in the late 19th century, but now has a flow of about 5 liters/second.
- Deildartunguhver in Iceland has a flow of 180 liters/second.
- There are at least three hot springs in the Nage region 8 km (5.0 mi) south west of Bajawa in Indonesia that collectively produce more than 453.6 liters/second.
- There are another three large hot springs (Mengeruda, Wae Bana and Piga) 18 km (11 mi) north east of Bajawa, Indonesia that together produce more than 450 liters/second of hot water.

== Ecosystems ==
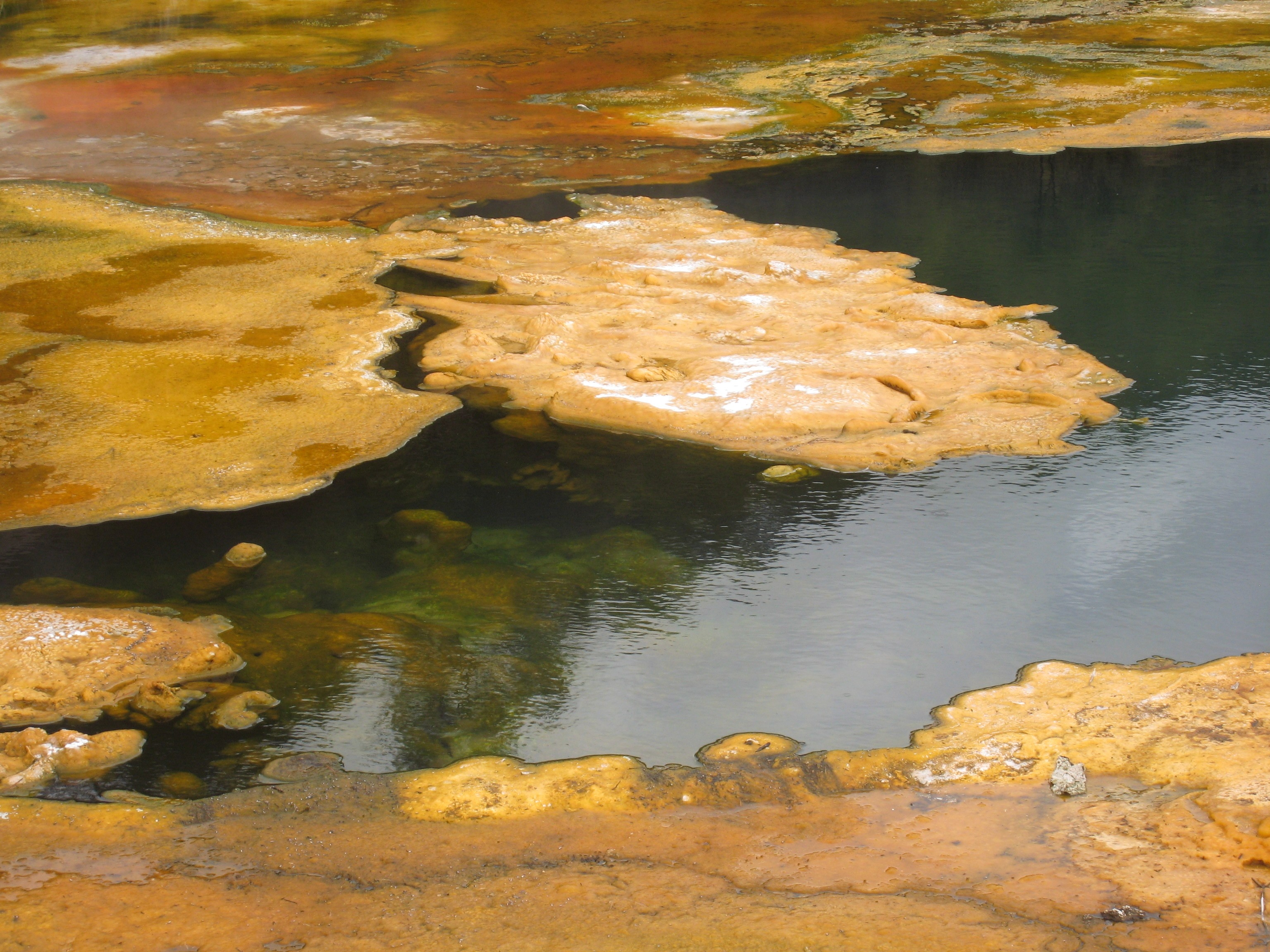
Algal mats growing in the Map of Africa hot pool, Orakei Korako, New Zealand

Hot springs often host communities of microorganisms adapted to life in hot, mineral-laden water. These include thermophiles, which are a type of extremophile that thrives at high temperatures, between 45 and 80 °C (113 and 176 °F). Further from the vent, where the water has had time to cool and precipitate part of its mineral load, conditions favor organisms adapted to less extreme conditions. This produces a succession of microbial communities as one moves away from the vent, which in some respects resembles the successive stages in the evolution of early life.

For example, in a bicarbonate hot spring, the community of organisms immediately around the vent is dominated by filamentous thermophilic bacteria, such as Aquifex and other Aquificales, that oxidize sulfide and hydrogen to obtain energy for their life processes. Further from the vent, where water temperatures have dropped below 60 °C (140 °F), the surface is covered with microbial mats 1 centimetre (0.39 in) thick that are dominated by cyanobacteria, such as Spirulina, Oscillatoria, and Synechococcus, and green sulfur bacteria such as Chloroflexus. These organisms are all capable of photosynthesis, though green sulfur bacteria produce sulfur rather than oxygen during photosynthesis. Still further from the vent, where temperatures drop below 45 °C (113 °F), conditions are favorable for a complex community of microorganisms that includes Spirulina, Calothrix, diatoms and other single-celled eukaryotes, and grazing insects and protozoans. As temperatures drop close to those of the surroundings, higher plants appear.

Alkali chloride hot springs show a similar succession of communities of organisms, with various thermophilic bacteria and archaea in the hottest parts of the vent. Acid sulfate hot springs show a somewhat different succession of microorganisms, dominated by acid-tolerant algae (such as members of Cyanidiophyceae), fungi, and diatoms. Iron-rich hot springs contain communities of photosynthetic organisms that oxidize reduced (ferrous) iron to oxidized (ferric) iron.

Hot springs are a dependable source of water that provides a rich chemical environment. This includes reduced chemical species that microorganisms can oxidize as a source of energy.

== Significance to abiogenesis ==
=== Hot spring hypothesis ===
In contrast with "black smokers" (hydrothermal vents on the ocean floor), hot springs similar to terrestrial hydrothermal fields at Kamchatka produce fluids having suitable pH and temperature for early cells and biochemical reactions. Dissolved organic compounds were found in hot springs at Kamchatka . Metal sulfides and silica minerals in these environments would act as photocatalysts. They experience cycles of wetting and drying which promote the formation of biopolymers which are then encapsulated in vesicles after rehydration. Solar UV exposure to the environment promotes synthesis to monomeric biomolecules. The ionic composition and concentration of hot springs (K, B, Zn, P, O, S, C, Mn, N, and H) are identical to the cytoplasm of modern cells and possibly to those of the LUCA or early cellular life according to phylogenomic analysis. For these reasons, it has been hypothesized that hot springs may be the place of origin of life on Earth. The evolutionary implications of the hypothesis imply a direct evolutionary pathway to land plants. Where continuous exposure to sunlight leads to the development of photosynthetic properties and later colonize on land and life at hydrothermal vents is suggested to be a later adaptation.

Recent experimental studies at hot springs support this hypothesis. They show that fatty acids self-assemble into membranous structures and encapsulate synthesized biomolecules during exposure to UV light and multiple wet-dry cycles at slightly alkaline or acidic hot springs, which would not happen at saltwater conditions as the high concentrations of ionic solutes there would inhibit the formation of membranous structures. David Deamer and Bruce Damer note that these hypothesized prebiotic environments resemble Charles Darwin's imagined "warm little pond". If life did not emerge at deep sea hydrothermal vents, rather at terrestrial pools, extraterrestrial quinones transported to the environment would generate redox reactions conducive to proton gradients. Without continuous wet-dry cycling to maintain stability of primitive proteins for membrane transport and other biological macromolecules, they would go through hydrolysis in an aquatic environment. Scientists discovered a 3.48 billion year old geyserite that seemingly preserved fossilized microbial life, stromatolites, and biosignatures. Researchers propose pyrophosphite to have been used by early cellular life for energy storage and it might have been a precursor to pyrophosphate. Phosphites, which are present at hot springs, would have bonded together into pyrophosphite within hot springs through wet-dry cycling. Like alkaline hydrothermal vents, the Hakuba Happo hot spring goes through serpentinization, suggesting methanogenic microbial life possibly originated in similar habitats.

=== Limitations ===
A problem with the hot spring hypothesis for an origin of life is that phosphate has low solubility in water. Pyrophosphite could have been present within protocells, however all modern life forms use pyrophosphate for energy storage. Kee suggests that pyrophosphate could have been utilized after the emergence of enzymes. Dehydrated conditions would favor phosphorylation of organic compounds and condensation of phosphate to polyphosphate. Another problem is that solar ultraviolet radiation and frequent impacts would have inhibited habitability of early cellular life at hot springs, although biological macromolecules might have undergone selection during exposure to solar ultraviolet radiation and would have been catalyzed by photocatalytic silica minerals and metal sulfides. Carbonaceous meteors during the Late Heavy Bombardment would not have caused cratering on Earth as they would produce fragments upon atmospheric entry. The meteors are estimated to have been 40 to 80 meters in diameter however larger impactors would produce larger craters. Metabolic pathways have not yet been demonstrated at these environments, but the development of proton gradients might have been generated by redox reactions coupled to meteoric quinones or protocell growth. Metabolic reactions in the Wood-Ljungdahl pathway and reverse Krebs cycle have been produced in acidic conditions and thermophilic temperatures in the presence of metals which is consistent with observations of RNA mostly stable at acidic pH.

== Human uses ==
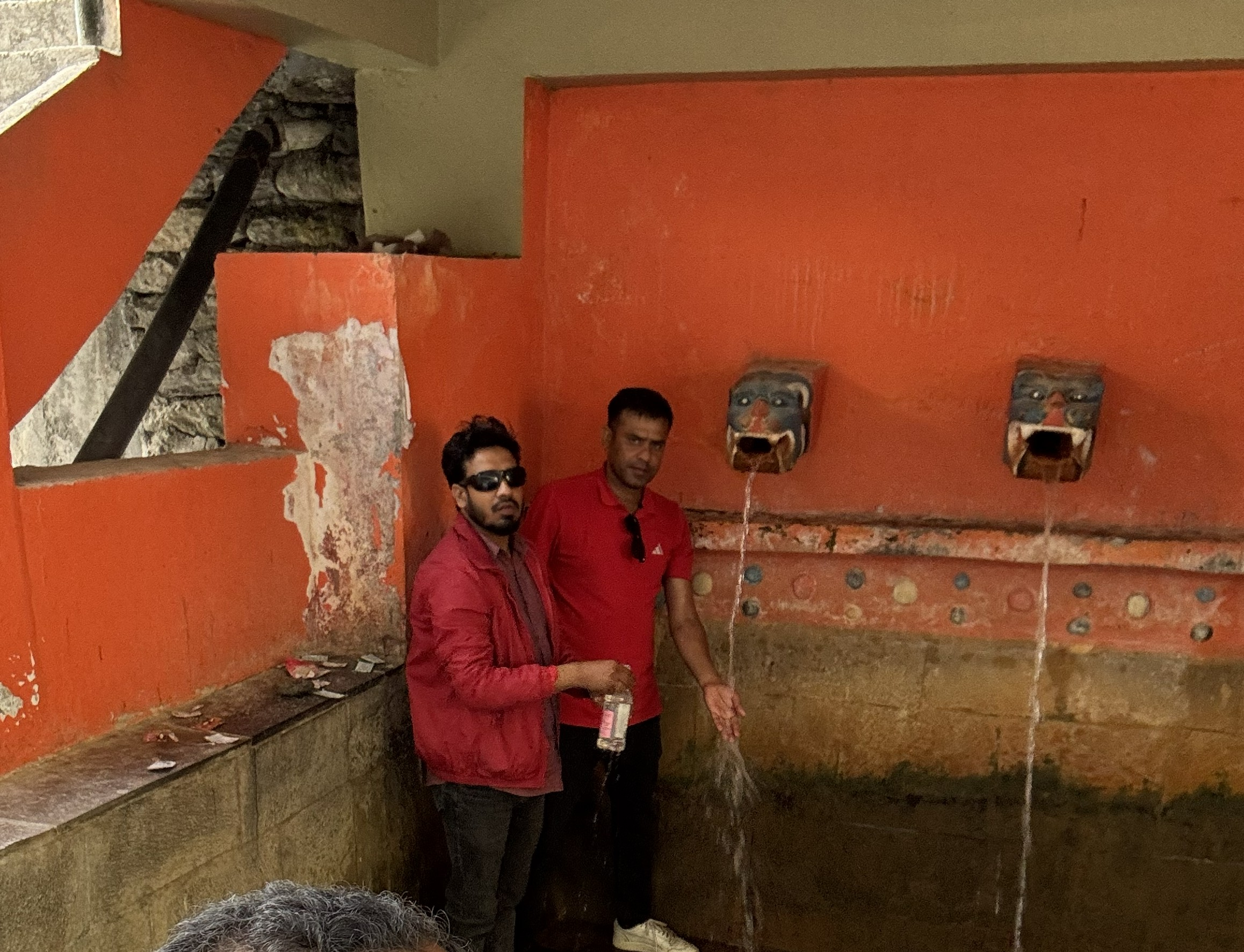
Hot spring in Sindhupalchowk District, Nepal

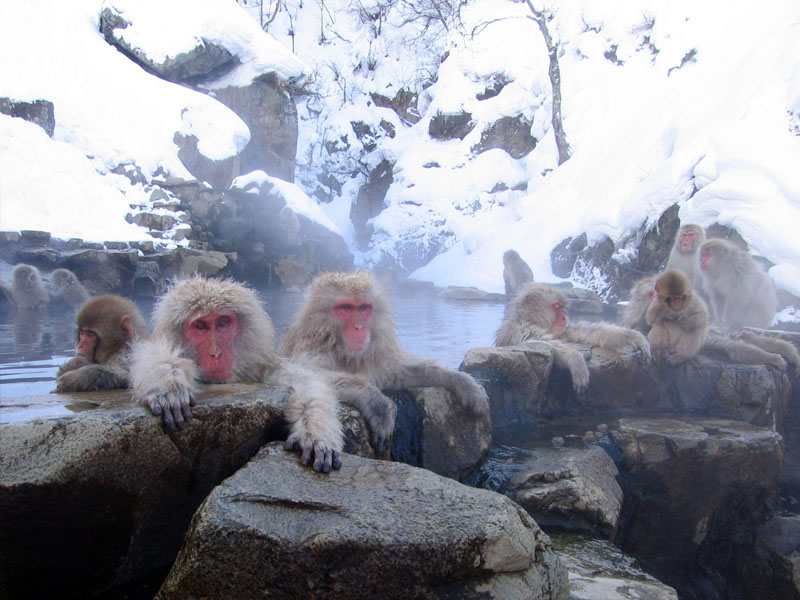
Macaques enjoying an open air hot spring or "onsen" in Nagano

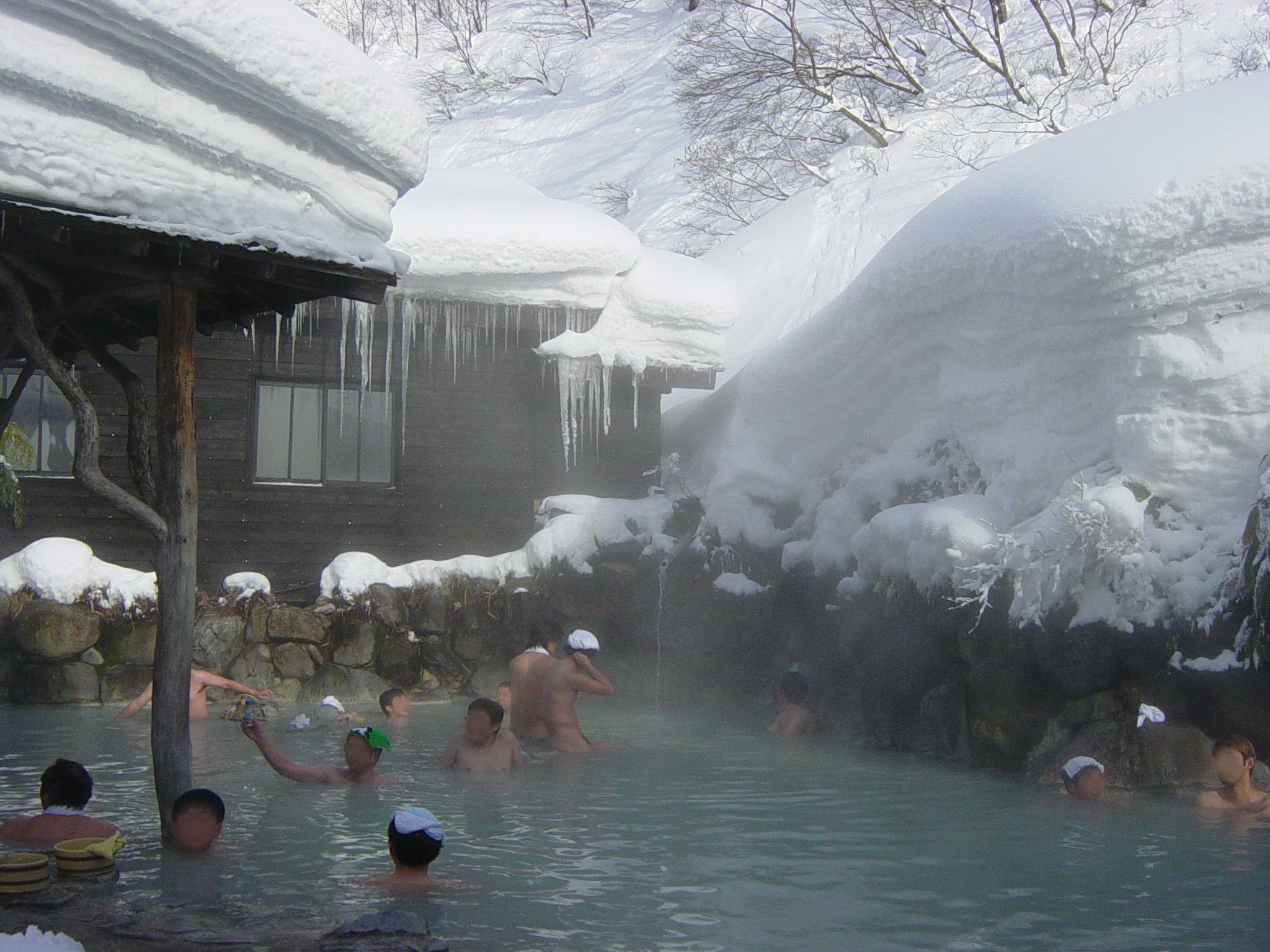
Winter bathing at Tsuru-no-yu roten-buro in Nyūtō, Akita

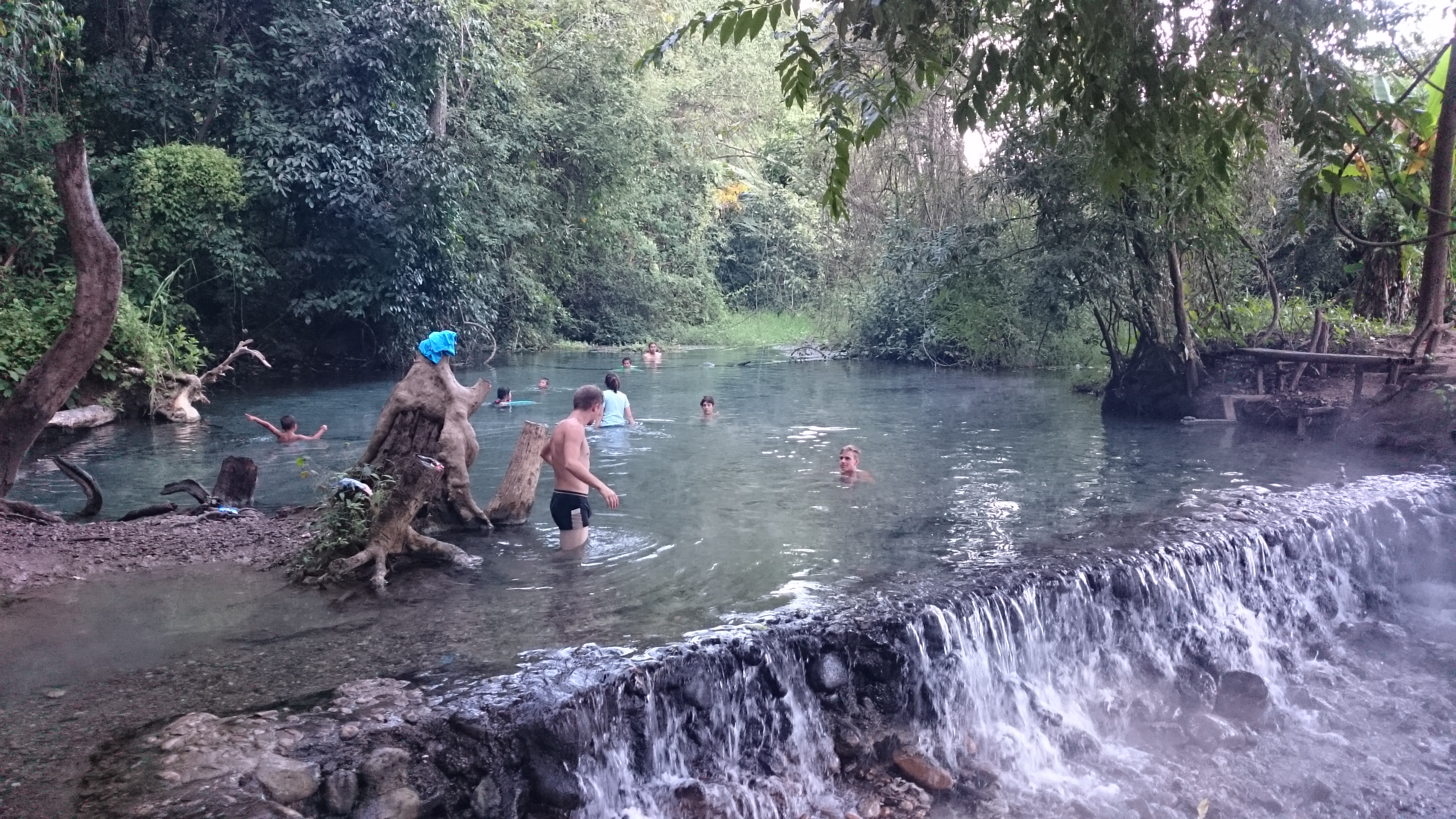
Sai Ngam hot springs in Mae Hong Son province, Thailand

=== Bathing ===
==== History ====
Hot springs have been enjoyed by humans for millennia. Even macaques are known to have extended their northern range into Japan by making use of hot springs to protect themselves from cold stress. Hot spring baths (onsen) have been in use in Japan for at least two thousand years, traditionally for cleanliness and relaxation, but increasingly for their therapeutic value. In the Homeric Age of Greece (ca. 1000 BCE), baths were primarily for hygiene, but by the time of Hippocrates (ca. 460 BCE), hot springs were credited with healing power. The popularity of hot springs has fluctuated over the centuries since, but they are now popular around the world. In 2023 the Global Wellness Institute, a wellness industry study, estimated the global earnings of the 31,200 hot springs establishments to be over $62 billion USD.

==== Therapeutic uses ====
Because of both the folklore and the claimed medical value attributed to some hot springs, they are often popular tourist destinations, and locations for rehabilitation clinics for those with disabilities. However, the scientific basis for therapeutic bathing in hot springs is uncertain. Hot bath therapy for lead poisoning was common and reportedly highly successful in the 18th and 19th centuries, and may have been due to diuresis (increased urine) from sitting in hot water, which increased excretion of lead; better food and isolation from lead sources; and increased intake of calcium and iron. Significant improvement in patients with rheumatoid arthritis and ankylosing spondylitis have been reported in studies of spa therapy, but these studies have methodological problems, such as the obvious impracticality of placebo-controlled studies (in which a patient does not know if they are receiving the therapy). As a result, the therapeutic effectiveness of hot spring therapy remains uncertain.

==== Precautions ====
Hot springs in volcanic areas are often at or near the boiling point. People have been seriously scalded and even killed by accidentally or intentionally entering these springs.

Some hot springs microbiota are infectious to humans:

- Naegleria fowleri, an excavate amoeba, lives in warm unsalted waters worldwide and causes a fatal meningitis should the organisms enter the nose.
- Acanthamoeba also can spread through hot springs, according to the US Centers for Disease Control - The organisms enter through the eyes or via an open wound.
- Legionella bacteria have been spread through hot springs.
- Neisseria gonorrhoeae was reported to have very likely been acquired from bathing in a hot spring according to one case study, with the near-body temperature, slightly acidic, isotonic, organic matter-containing waters thought to facilitate the survival of the pathogen.

==== Etiquette ====
The customs and practices observed differ depending on the hot spring. It is common practice that bathers should wash before entering the water so as not to contaminate the water (with/without soap). In many countries, like Japan, it is required to enter the hot spring with no clothes on, including swimwear. Often there are different facilities or times for men and women, but mixed onsen do exist. In some countries, if it is a public hot spring, swimwear is required.

=== Cooking and drinking ===
Hot springs are used for geothermal cooking, such as boiling eggs and vegetables at Hammam Maskhoutine (Algeria), and in Japan. Immersing eggs into hot springs of around 67 °C (153 °F) produces onsen tamago (lit. 'hot spring egg'), which have unique texture unlike ordinary boiled eggs, with a soft-set yolk and custardy white. Onsen tamago are served in hot spring resorts throughout Japan.

Some people drink the water from hot springs as folk remedies.

== Examples ==
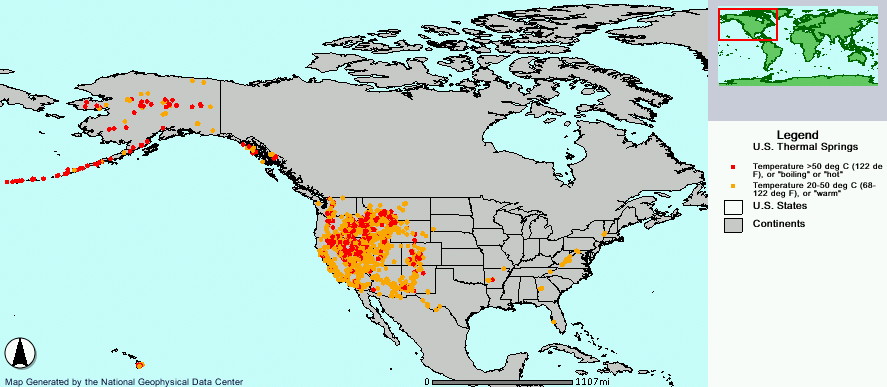
Distribution of geothermal springs in the US

There are hot springs in many places and on all continents of the world. Countries that are renowned for their hot springs include China, Costa Rica, Hungary, Iceland, Iran, Japan, New Zealand, Brazil, Peru, Serbia, South Korea, Taiwan, Turkey, and the United States, but there are hot springs in many other places as well:

- Widely renowned since a chemistry professor's report in 1918 classified them as one of the world's most electrolytic mineral waters, the Rio Hondo Hot Springs in northern Argentina have become among the most visited on earth. The Cacheuta Spa is another famous hot springs in Argentina.
- The springs in Europe with the highest temperatures are located in France, in a small village named Chaudes-Aigues. Located at the heart of the French volcanic region Auvergne, the thirty natural hot springs of Chaudes-Aigues have temperatures ranging from 45 °C (113 °F) to more than 80 °C (176 °F). The hottest one, the "Source du Par", has a temperature of 82 °C (180 °F). The hot waters running under the village have provided heat for the houses and for the church since the 14th Century. Chaudes-Aigues (Cantal, France) is a spa town known since the Roman Empire for the treatment of rheumatism.
- Carbonate aquifers in foreland tectonic settings can host important thermal springs although located in areas commonly not characterised by regional high heat flow values. In these cases, when thermal springs are located close or along the coastlines, the subaerial and/or submarine thermal springs constitute the outflow of marine groundwater, flowing through localised fractures and karstic rock-volumes. This is the case of springs occurring along the south-easternmost portion of the Apulia region (Southern Italy) where few sulphurous and warm waters (22–33 °C (72–91 °F)) outflow in partially submerged caves located along the Adriatic coast, thus supplying the historical spas of Santa Cesarea Terme. These springs are known from ancient times (Aristotele in III Century BC) and the physical-chemical features of their thermal waters resulted to be partly influenced by the sea level variations.
- One of the potential geothermal energy reservoirs in India is the Tattapani thermal springs of Madhya Pradesh.
- The silica-rich deposits found in Nili Patera, the volcanic caldera in Syrtis Major, Mars, are thought to be the remains of an extinct hot spring system.

== See also ==
- Hotspot (geology)
- Hydrothermal vents
- Earliest known life forms
- List of spa towns
- List of hot springs (worldwide listing)
- List of hot springs in Japan
- List of hot springs in the United States
- Mineral spring
- Valley of Geysers
