= Balatonring =

Unbuilt motor racing circuit

- Second proposed layout of Balatonring circuit
- Location: Sávoly, Hungary
- Coordinates: 46°34′19.2″N 17°16′8.4″E
- Major events: Grand Prix motorcycle racing Hungarian motorcycle Grand Prix (cancelled)

Full Circuit
- Length: 4.650 km (2.889 mi)
- Turns: 17

Balatonring was to be a 4.650 km (2.889 mi) motor racing circuit, located in Sávoly, Hungary, on the western end of the Balaton. The site is located about 180 km (110 mi) from Budapest, the capital city of Hungary. Spain's Balatonring Zrt was to operate the racing circuit with a 70% share owned by Worldwide Circuit Management S.L. (WCM) and Magyar Turizmus Zrt. (Hungarian Tourism Board) owning 30%. Spanish investment group Sedesa would have been the constructor at a cost of €.80 million and seating for 110,000 to 140,000 would have been provided.

First proposed layout of Balatonring circuit

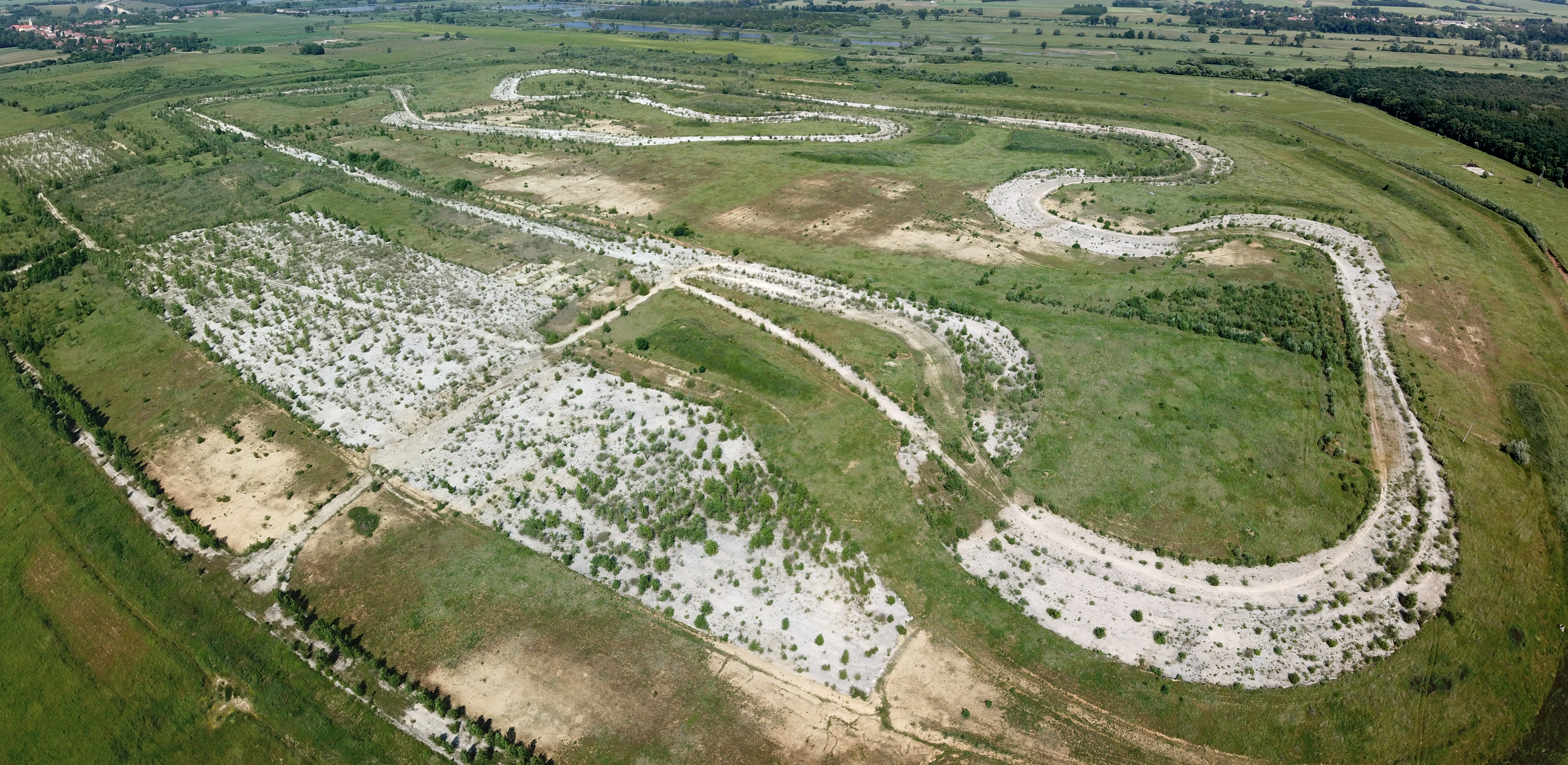
Aerial view of the abandoned circuit, 2018

Construction work on the 200 million Euro project had started on 6 November 2008, and the facility was due to host its first MotoGP race on 20 September 2009. However, on 11 March 2009, motogpmatters.com reported that the Hungarian round would be canceled due to problems related to the 2008 financial crisis. The circuit would not be completed in time for the 20 September race. The first Hungarian GP was scheduled to take place in September 2010.

On 18 March 2010 the Hungarian motorcycle Grand Prix was cancelled as the FIM said the construction work needed would not be done in time for the event. It was replaced by the Aragon motorcycle Grand Prix in MotorLand Aragón, Spain.

As of November 2012, the plot was on auction for a month. The project accumulated a total debt of HUF 3.5 bn (USD 16,000,000) and the plot was being sold for HUF 1.5 bn (USD 6,800,000). Nothing can be seen from the track line as weeds have grown over it.
