= Polgár, Hungary =

Polgár
- Town
- Flag Coat of arms

- Location within Hungary
- Coordinates: 47.8663°N 21.1242°E
- Country: Hungary
- County: Hajdú-Bihar
- District: Hajdúnánás

Area
  - Total: 97.46 km^{2} (37.63 sq mi)

Population (2001)
  - Total: 8,418
- Time zone: UTC+1 (CET)
  - Summer (DST): UTC+2 (CEST)
- Postal code: 4090
- Area code: (+36) 52
- Website: polgar.hu

Polgár is a town in Hajdú-Bihar County in eastern Hungary.

This is a town with 8,598 inhabitants at the tri–point of 3 counties at the temporary end of the No. 3 motorway. Its natural vegetation is part of the Tiszántúl district, and the birds are the most valuable of its fauna. It is rich in fish and game (pheasant, wild duck, partridge, boar, hare, deer). In the vicinity of Polgár, various Bronze Age items were excavated. The Blessed Virgin church was built from 1852 to 1856 in a neo-Classical style according to plans by József Hild. In 1944, it was blown up, then it was re–constructed from 1948 to 1958. The Kálvária group of buildings from 1769 is a listed monument including the Polonkai House. The town is picturesque as the streets of this market town preserve the characteristics of the folk architecture of Matyóland. Health and spa facilities include a medicinal and open-air bath and water sport facilities. A boating lake and a 20 hectare park also belongs to the bath facilities. There is a campsite for 30 persons beside the bathing facilities. A lot of foreign guests return here year after year.

== Etymology ==
Polgár is a status name for a freeman of a town, as a Magyar or Hungarian name especially for one who was a member of a town's governing council.

== Places of Interest ==
- Calvary Hill
- Beach Bath (medicinal water)
- Archeological Park
- Tire Burning Plant (the 3rd largest direct burning plant under construction in Hungary).

== Demographics ==
In 2001, 94% of the city's population declared themselves to be Hungarian and 6% to be Roma.

== Famous people ==
- Géza Némethy (1865–1937), a classical philologist, literary historian and member of the Hungarian Academy of Sciences, was born here.
- István Barankovics (1906-1974), was a politician and journalist, one of the leaders of the Hungarian Christian People 's Movement and the Secretary General of the Democratic People's Party.
- Ildikó Pécs (1940-2020), a Jászai Mari Prize winner and Kossuth Prize winner.
- Sándor Klacsmányi (1941-2011) was a journalist and translator.
- András Görömbei 1945-2013), literary historian, correspondent member of the Hungarian Academy of Sciences, Kossuth Prize (2000).

== See also ==
- Hajdú-Bihar
- Hungary
