= István Tiba =

Hungarian dentist and politician (born 1962)

Member of the National Assembly
- In office 13 October 2008 – 8 May 2026
- In office 15 May 2002 – 15 May 2006

Personal details
- Born: 6 May 1962 (age 64) Miskolc, Hungary
- Party: Fidesz (since 1998)
- Profession: dentist, politician

Dr. István Tiba (born 6 May 1962) is a Hungarian dentist and politician, member of the National Assembly (MP) for Balmazújváros (Hajdú-Bihar County Constituency VIII) from 2002 to 2006 and from 2010 to 2014. Thereafter, he was MP for Hajdúböszörmény (Hajdú-Bihar County Constituency VI) from 2014 to 2026. He was also MP from the county regional list of Fidesz between 2008 and 2010. He was elected mayor of Balmazújváros during the local elections held in 2006, holding the office until 2014.

== Work experience ==
István Tiba finished the Földes Ferenc Secondary School in Miskolc in 1980. He worked as a male nurse for the Hungarian Ambulance Service in Budapest from 1980 to 1982, then as a dental technician for the Dental Technology Company from 1982 to 1983. After that, he studied at the Faculty of Dentistry of Debrecen University of Medicine and graduated as a dentist in 1988.

He then moved to Balmazújváros, where he lives and works in his own dental surgery business ever since. He passed a specialist examination in dentistry and stomatology in 1991 and in paediatric dentistry in 1993. He has been working as the managing head dentist of the Balmazújváros Municipal Health Service since 1996. He received an advanced degree in health care management from the University of Economic Sciences of Budapest in 1998. He is Chairman of the Board of Trustees of the Szegletkő (Cornerstone) Foundation and a presbyter of the Reformed Church.

== Political career ==
He ran in the 1998 parliamentary election as a candidate on the Hajdú-Bihar County Regional List of the Hungarian Democratic Forum (MDF). He joined Fidesz in 1998. He came second as a candidate for the mayoral position of Balmazújváros in the 1998 local elections, and became a local representative. He was appointed president of the Balmazújváros organization of Fidesz in 2000.

Tiba secured a seat in Parliament in the second round of the national election on 21 April 2002, representing Balmazújváros (Constituency VIII, Hajdú-Bihar County). He served on the Health Committee in the newly established Parliament since the middle of May 2002. In the local elections held in the autumn of 2002 he was elected a local representative in Balmazújváros.

During the 2006 parliamentary election, he lost his parliamentary seat. He was elected mayor of Balmazújváros in the 2006 local elections. He secured a parliamentary mandate in October 2008 from the party's county regional list, replacing Sándor Arnóth who resigned from his position. Tiba functioned as a member of the Committee on Youth, Social and Family Affairs until 13 May 2010. He was elected MP for Balmazújváros in the 2010 parliamentary election. He became a member of the Local Government and Urban Development Committee on 14 May 2010. He was appointed one of the recorders of the National Assembly on 22 February 2011, succeeding Norbert Erdős. He held that office until May 2026. He was a member of the Enterprise Development Committee from 2014 to 2020, the European Affairs Committee from 2020 to 2023, and the National Cohesion Committee from 2023 to 2026.

He was replaced as individual candidate for Hajdúböszörmény by the Fidesz presidium for the 2026 Hungarian parliamentary election. Although his name appeared in his party's national list, he did not secure a mandate.

== Football ==
Under his chairmanship, the Balmazújvárosi FC was re-established in 2011. The club received 1.2 billion HUF public funds as a backing to develop the club's stadium and the team from 2011 to 2016. Balmazújváros finished second in the 2016–17 Nemzeti Bajnokság II season thereby gaining promotion to the highest level of the Hungarian League system. After spending a year in Nemzeti Bajnokság I, the club relegated to the second level and went into bankrupt by 2018. On 29 August 2019, the club was excluded from the 2019–20 Nemzeti Bajnokság II too due to financial problems.
