= Hajdúböszörmény =

- Town
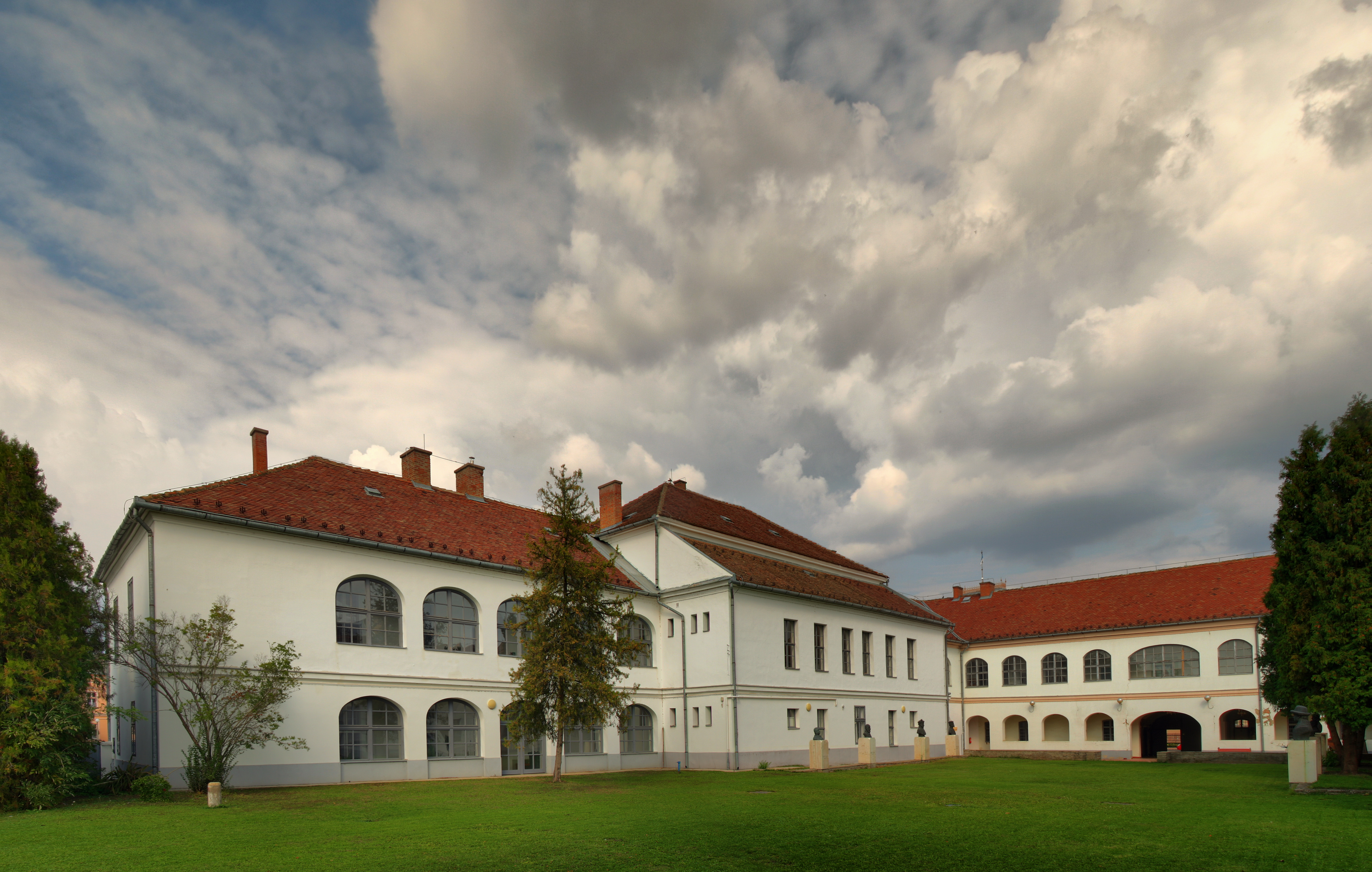

- Flag Coat of arms

- Location within Hungary Location within Europe
- Coordinates: 47°40′N 21°31′E
- Country: Hungary
- County: Hajdú-Bihar
- District: Hajdúböszörmény

Government
  - Mayor: Éva Göröghné Bocskai (TISZA)

Area
  - Total: 370.74 km^{2} (143.14 sq mi)

Population (2015)
  - Total: 31,224
  - Density: 84.221/km^{2} (218.13/sq mi)
- Time zone: UTC+1 (CET)
  - Summer (DST): UTC+2 (CEST)
- Postal code: 4220, 4224, 4074
- Area code: (+36) 52
- Website: www.hajduboszormeny.hu

Hajdúböszörmény [ˈhɒjduːbøsørmeːɲ] is a town in northeastern Hungary with a population of approximately 30,000 people.

== History ==
It was formerly known as Böszörmény, with added prefix Hajdú from Hajduk.

It is also home to one of the faculties of the University of Debrecen. It has a unique circular plan (like Paris) to the streets that is supposed to have originated as a defense from invasion or attack. Not knowing the plan of the streets a visitor could easily get quite lost only to discover that they were walking in circles for an extended period.

Like many smaller towns of Hungary the population even within the city limits generates income as well as household necessities from agriculture and animal husbandry, because of this feature of the local economy, high fences and a cornucopia of smells are very common even within the town core.

Both World Wars have taken a toll on Böszörmény: after World War I the city was occupied by the Romanian Army from April 1919 to March 1920. In World War II the city was heavily bombed in 1944 by the RAF and the American Air Force.

In 1990s Hajdúböszörmény underwent an economic crisis causing widespread unemployment. Many attribute high unemployment levels to the falling of the Iron Curtain that took place in 1989 and the adjustment period that any economy would need to go through in such an economic upheaval. One more recent cause of unemployment was the downsizing of the General Electric Tungsram plant (due to new economic options the company was exploring in China).

== Twin towns – sister cities ==
Hajdúböszörmény is twinned with:

- Berehove, Ukraine
- Harkány, Hungary
- Joseni, Romania
- Kraśnik, Poland
- Montesilvano, Italy
- Salonta, Romania
- Siilinjärvi, Finland
- Trogir, Croatia
- Újrónafő, Hungary
