= Harkány =

- Town
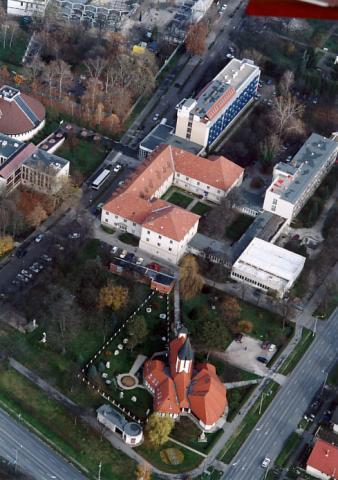
- Aerial view

- Flag Coat of arms
- Interactive map of Harkány
- Location of Harkány
- Coordinates: 45.84756°N 18.23694°E
- Country: Hungary
- County: Baranya
- District: Siklós

Area
  - Total: 25.69 km^{2} (9.92 sq mi)

Population (2015)
  - Total: 4,219
  - Density: 164.2/km^{2} (425.3/sq mi)
- Time zone: UTC+1 (CET)
  - Summer (DST): UTC+2 (CEST)
- Postal code: 7815
- Area code: (+36) 72
- Website: www.harkany.hu

Harkány (Croatian: Harkanj) is a town in Baranya county, Hungary.

== History ==
The area has been inhabited since medieval times, the name "Nagh Harkan" was mentioned in a document from the year 1323. The origin and meaning of the name harkány is unknown, but archaeological findings show that the area was inhabited by Huns and Avars about 1,000 years ago. Until the end of World War II, the majority of the inhabitants were Danube Swabians, also called locally as Stifolder, because their ancestors arrived in the 17th and 18th centuries from the German district of Fulda. Most of the former German settlers were expelled to Allied-occupied Germany and Allied-occupied Austria in 1945–1948, consequent to the Potsdam Agreement.

Few Germans remain today, the majority of the modern population are the descendants of Hungarians from the Czechoslovak–Hungarian population exchange. They occupied the houses of the former Danube Swabian inhabitants.

== Spa ==
Medical waters rich in sulfur were discovered by Pogány János in 1823, a well digger who sensed the warm waters had a good effect on his ill leg.

The medical benefits of the waters are proved in treatment of locomotor disorders, chronic gynaecological inflammations and lymphatic malfunctions and for psoriasis.

The spa is located in a huge 13.5-hectare primeval park, among hundreds of years old trees, where it awaits visitors who want to relax with a beach bath, spa and slide park. In addition to healing skin diseases, the bath water is also excellent for treating infertility problems.

== Tourism ==
Since the discovery of the medical waters 150 years ago, the number of tourists visiting the spa of Harkány has reached one million people yearly. Harkány is one of the most famous city spas; a lot of places of accommodation and recreation have been built. Most of the hotels are of European standards. Harkány has a hospital for treatment of rheumatic related illnesses.

== Demographics ==
As of 2022, the town was 86.3% Hungarian, 4.5% German, 3.8% Croatian, 1% Serbian, and 2.6% of non-European origin. The population was 33.3% Roman Catholic, and 12.1% Reformed.

== Twin towns – sister cities ==
Harkány is twinned with:

- Băile Tușnad, Romania
- Bačko Petrovo Selo, Serbia
