= Hajdúnánás =

- Town
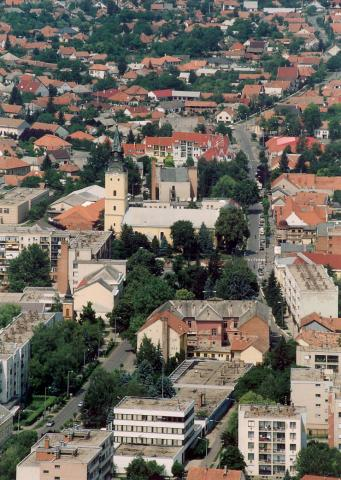
- Aerial view

- Flag Coat of arms

- Location within Hungary
- Coordinates: 47°51′N 21°26′E
- Country: Hungary
- County: Hajdú-Bihar
- District: Hajdúnánás

Government
  - Mayor: Judit Bódi (Összefogás Hajdúnánásért)

Area
  - Total: 259.62 km^{2} (100.24 sq mi)

Population (2015)
  - Total: 17,172
  - Density: 66.1/km^{2} (171/sq mi)
- Time zone: UTC+1 (CET)
  - Summer (DST): UTC+2 (CEST)
- Postal code: 4080
- Area code: (+36) 52
- Website: hajdunanas.hu

Hajdúnánás is a town in Hajdú-Bihar County, in the Northern Great Plain region of eastern Hungary.

It was formerly known as Nánás, with added prefix Hajdú from Hajduk.

== Geography ==
It covers an area of 259.62 km^{2} (100 sq mi) and has a population of 17,172 people (2015).

== Racetrack ==
On 21 June 2020, the Magyar Nemzetkozi Motodrome was announced to be built near Hajdúnánás, at the centre of the Debrecen-Miskolc-Nyíregyháza triangle. This track would be suitable to host MotoGP, as well as Formula 1 races in the future.

== Notable residents ==
- Zoltán Nagy, footballer
- József Mónus, world recorder archer
- Zoltán Csehi, footballer
- Annamária Bogdanović, handballer
- Ágnes Szilágyi, handballer
- Anita Kazai, handballer
- Valéria Szabó, handballer
- Tamás Kulcsár, footballer
- Anett Sopronyi, handballer
- R. Yisrael Efraim Fischel Schreiber (Sofer), Rabbi of Hajdúnánás and author the Afsei Aretz (1862)
- Gábor Tánczos, politician, Minister of Foreign Affairs (1919)
- Viktória Rédei Soós, handballer
- István Spitzmüller, footballer
- Paul Ornstein, Hungarian-American psychoanalyst
- Béla Vihar, poet, journalist, writer, teacher
- Meinhart Maur, German film actor
- Imre Hódos, wrestler
- Henrietta Csiszár, footballer

== Twin towns – sister cities ==
Hajdúnánás is twinned with:

- Piešťany, Slovakia
- Ustroń, Poland
- Valea lui Mihai, Romania

== Sport ==
- Hajdúnánás FK, association football team
