= Újtikos =

Coordinates: 47°55′N 21°11′E

- Interactive map of Újtikos
- Country: Hungary
- County: Hajdú-Bihar

Area
  - Total: 35.29 km^{2} (13.63 sq mi)

Population (2025)
  - Total: 737
- Time zone: UTC+1 (CET)
  - Summer (DST): UTC+2 (CEST)
- Postal code: 4096
- Area code: 52

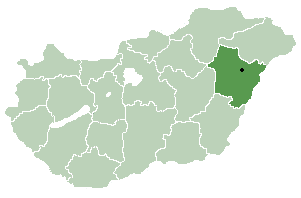
Location of Hajdú-Bihar county in Hungary

Újtikos is a village located in Hajdú-Bihar county, in the Northern Great Plain region of eastern Hungary.

== Geography ==
It covers an area of 35.29 km^{2} (14 sq mi) and has a population of 956 people (2001).
