= Folyás =

Coordinates: 47°48′N 21°08′E

- Interactive map of Folyás
- Country: Hungary
- County: Hajdú-Bihar

Area
  - Total: 53.92 km^{2} (20.82 sq mi)

Population (2015)
  - Total: 297
  - Density: 5.5/km^{2} (14/sq mi)
- Time zone: UTC+1 (CET)
  - Summer (DST): UTC+2 (CEST)
- Postal code: 4090
- Area code: 52

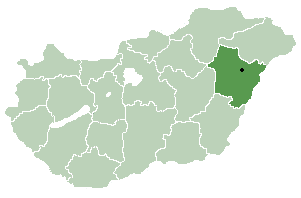
Location of Hajdú-Bihar county in Hungary

Folyás is a village in Hajdú-Bihar county, in the Northern Great Plain region of eastern Hungary.

== Geography ==
It covers an area of 53.92 km^{2} (21 sq mi) and has a population of 297 people (2015).
