= Mátészalka District =

Coordinates: 47.9167°N 22.3333°E

Mátészalka District Mátészalkai járás
- Districts of Hungary
- Coat of arms

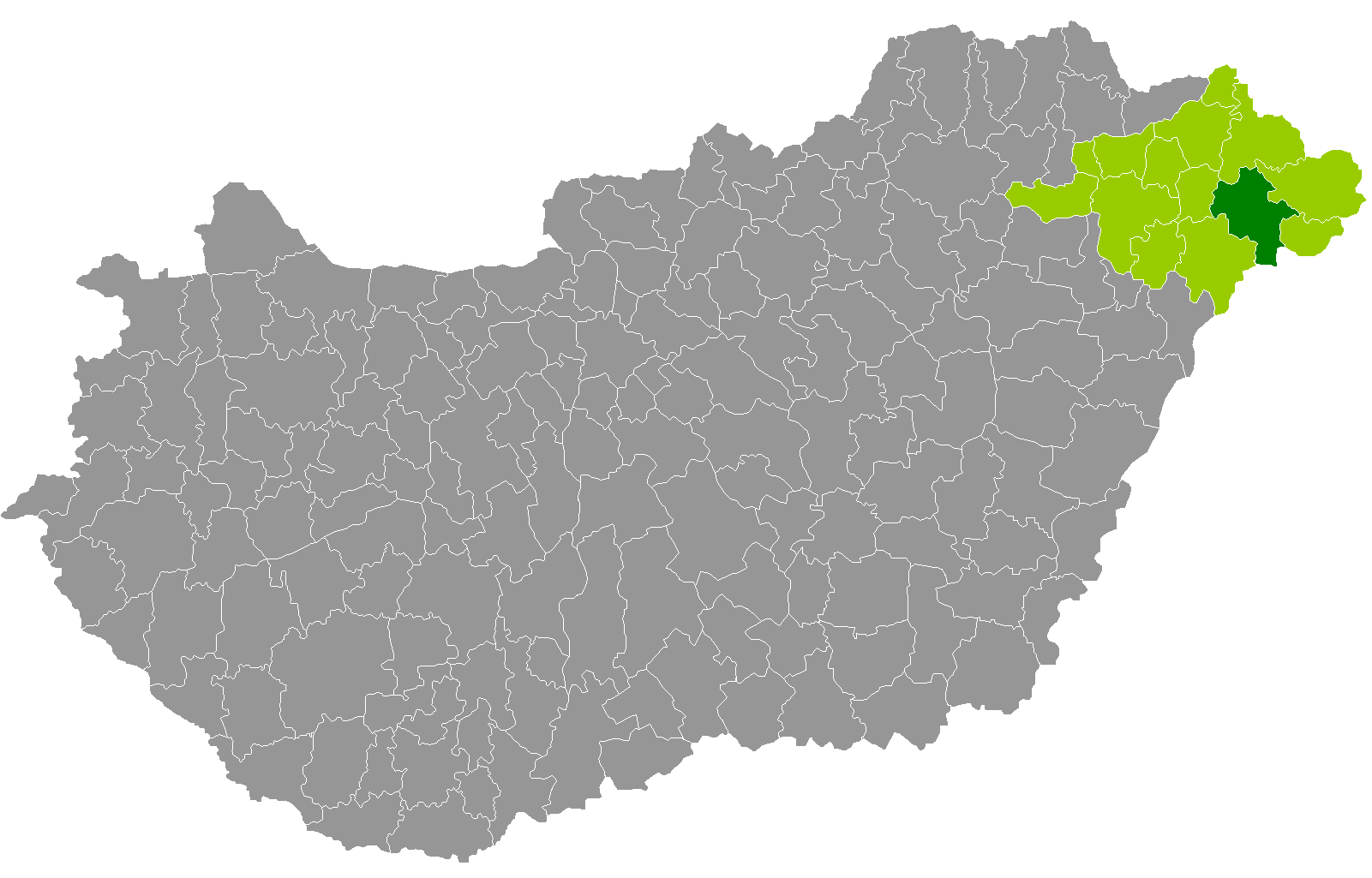
- Mátészalka District within Hungary and Szabolcs-Szatmár-Bereg County.
- Country: Hungary
- County: Szabolcs-Szatmár-Bereg
- District seat: Mátészalka

Area
  - Total: 624.70 km^{2} (241.20 sq mi)
  - Rank: 4th in Szabolcs-Szatmár-Bereg

Population (2011 census)
  - Total: 64,015
  - Rank: 2nd in Szabolcs-Szatmár-Bereg
  - Density: 102/km^{2} (260/sq mi)

Mátészalka (Hungarian: Mátészalkai járás) is a district in central-eastern part of Szabolcs-Szatmár-Bereg County. Mátészalka is also the name of the town where the district seat is found. The district is located in the Northern Great Plain Statistical Region. This district is a part of Szatmár historical and geographical region.

== Geography ==
Mátészalka District borders with Vásárosnamény District to the north, Fehérgyarmat District and Csenger District to the east, the Romanian county of Satu Mare to the south, Nyírbátor District and Baktalórántháza District to the west. The number of the inhabited places in Mátészalka District is 26.

== Municipalities ==
The district has 3 towns, 3 large villages and 20 villages. (ordered by population, as of 1 January 2013)

- Fábiánháza (1,718)
- Fülpösdaróc (316)
- Géberjén (496)
- Győrtelek (1,615)
- Hodász (3,349)
- Jármi (1,280)
- Kántorjánosi (2,150)
- Kocsord (2,893)
- **Mátészalka** (17,144) – district seat
- Mérk (2,171)
- Nagydobos (2,142)
- **Nagyecsed** (6,524)
- Nyírcsaholy (2,210)
- Nyírkáta (1,975)
- Nyírmeggyes (2,622)
- Nyírparasznya (982)
- Ököritófülpös (1,859)
- Ópályi (2,968)
- Őr (1,451)
- Papos (830)
- Rápolt (139)
- Szamoskér (398)
- Szamosszeg (1,955)
- Tiborszállás (1,019)
- **Vaja** (3,639)
- Vállaj (965)

The bolded municipalities are cities, italics municipalities are large villages.

== Demographics ==
Religion in Mátészalka District (2011 census)
1. Calvinism (49.7%)
2. Greek Catholicism (12.9%)
3. Catholic Church (12.0%)
4. Other religions (3.40%)
5. Non-religious (6.10%)
6. Atheists (0.20%)
7. Undeclared (15.7%)

In 2011, it had a population of 64,015 and the population density was 102/km².

Year	County population	Change
2011	64,015	n/a

=== Ethnicity ===
Besides the Hungarian majority, the main minorities are the Roma (approx. 7,500), German (1,000), Romanian (200) and Ukrainian (100).

Total population (2011 census): 64,015
Ethnic groups (2011 census): Identified themselves: 66,204 persons:

- Hungarians: 57,546 (86.92%)
- Gypsies: 7,259 (10.96%)
- Germans: 899 (1.36%)
- Others and indefinable: 500 (0.76%)

Approx. 2,000 persons in Mátészalka District did declare more than one ethnic group at the 2011 census.

=== Religion ===
Religious adherence in the county according to 2011 census:

- Reformed – 31,809;
- Catholic – 15,959 (Greek Catholic – 8,264; Roman Catholic – 7,695);
- other religions – 2,171;
- Non-religious – 3,884;
- Atheism – 163;
- Undeclared – 10,029.

== Gallery ==
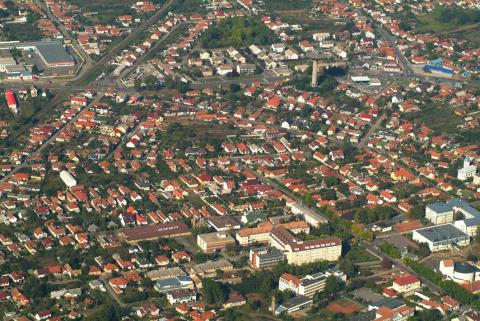
Mátészalka, the district seat

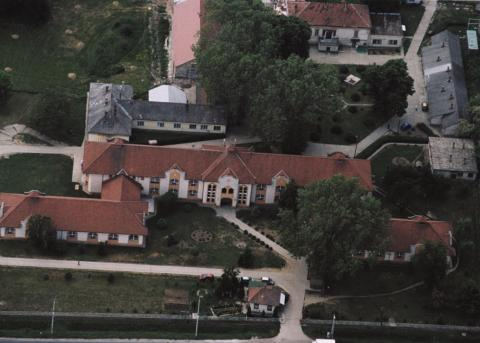
Aerial view of Győrtelek

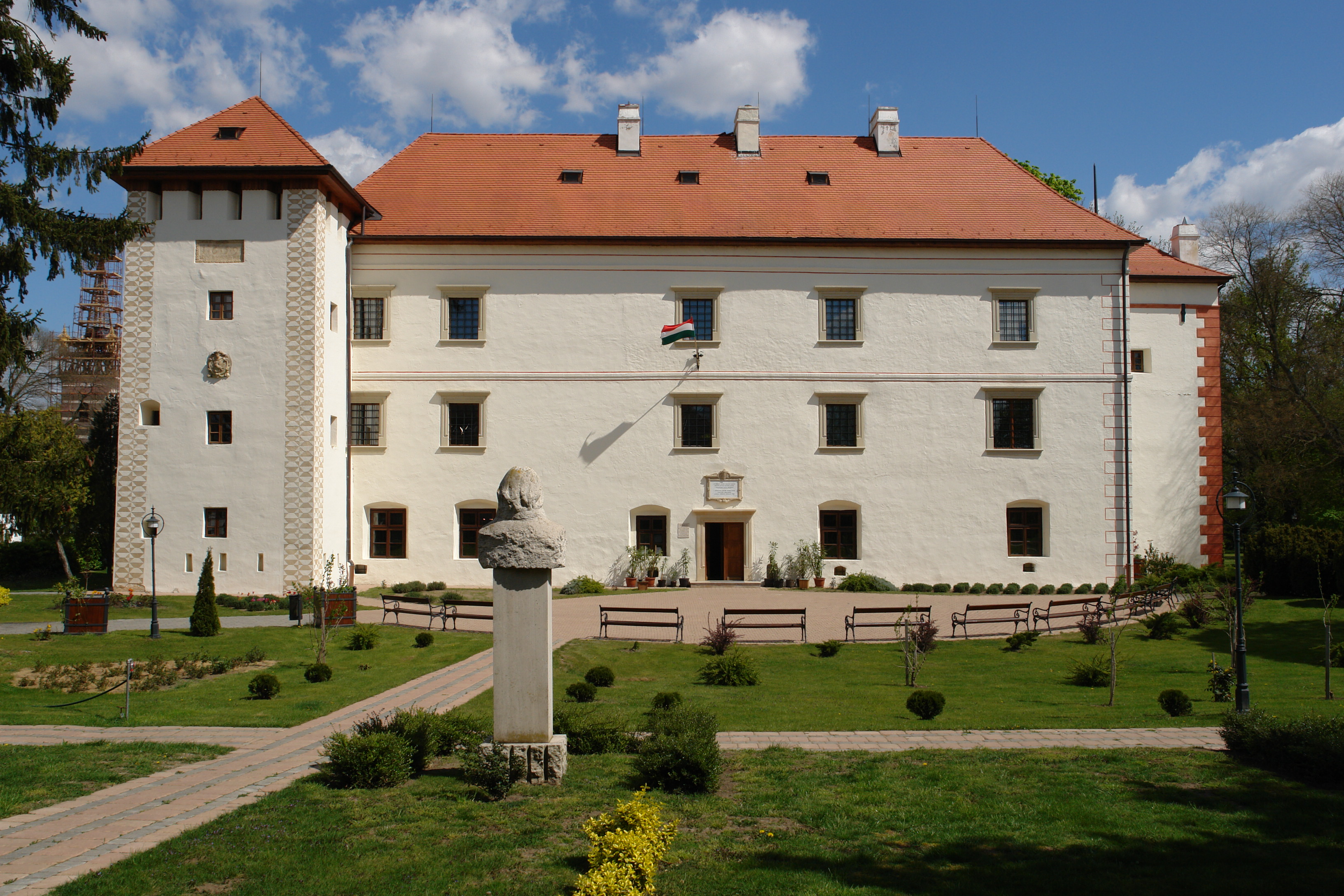
Vay Mansion in Vaja

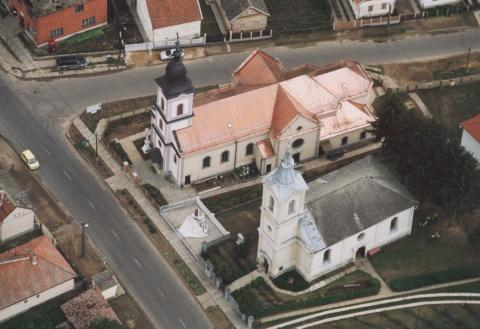
Aerial view of Mérk

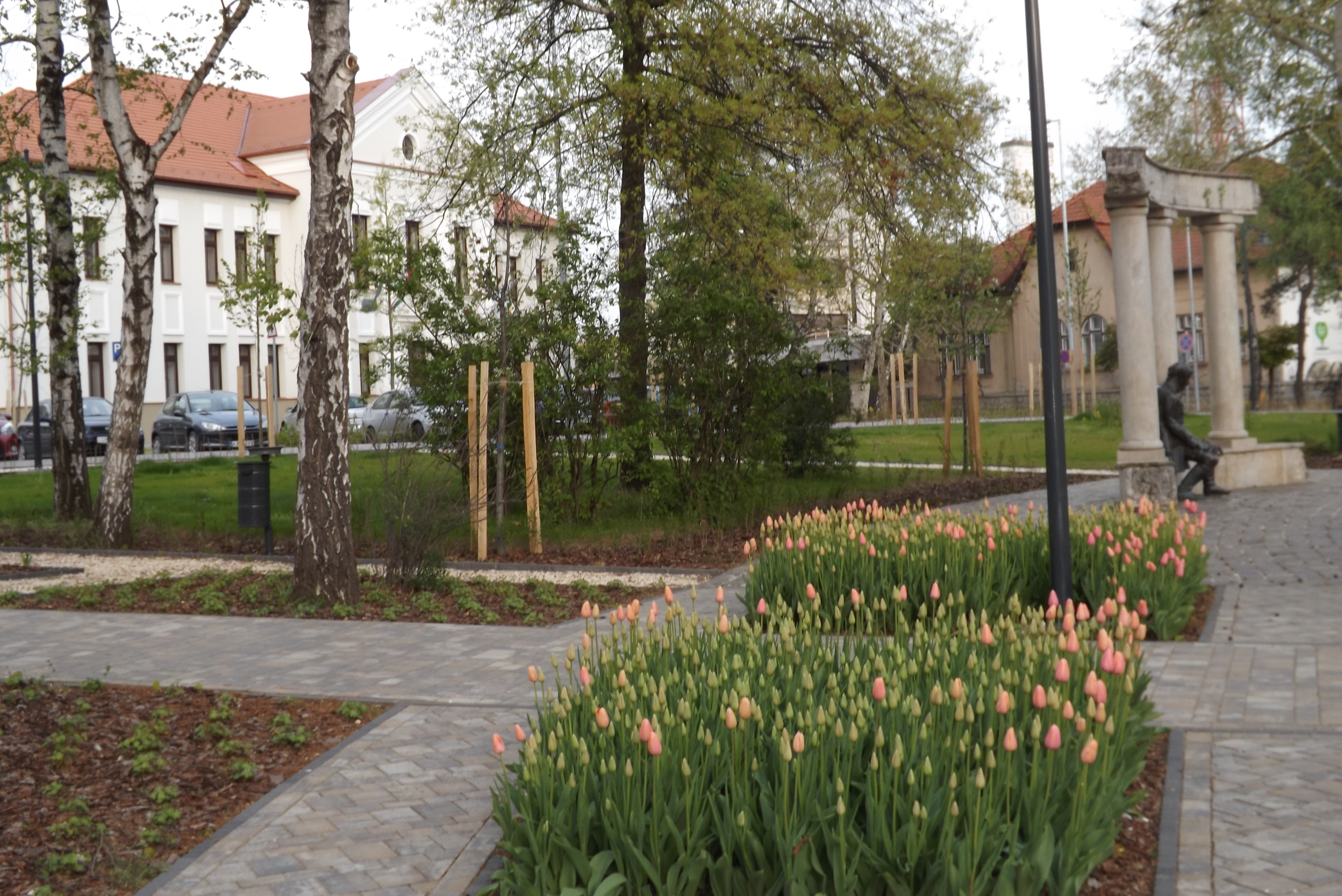
Park in Mátészalka

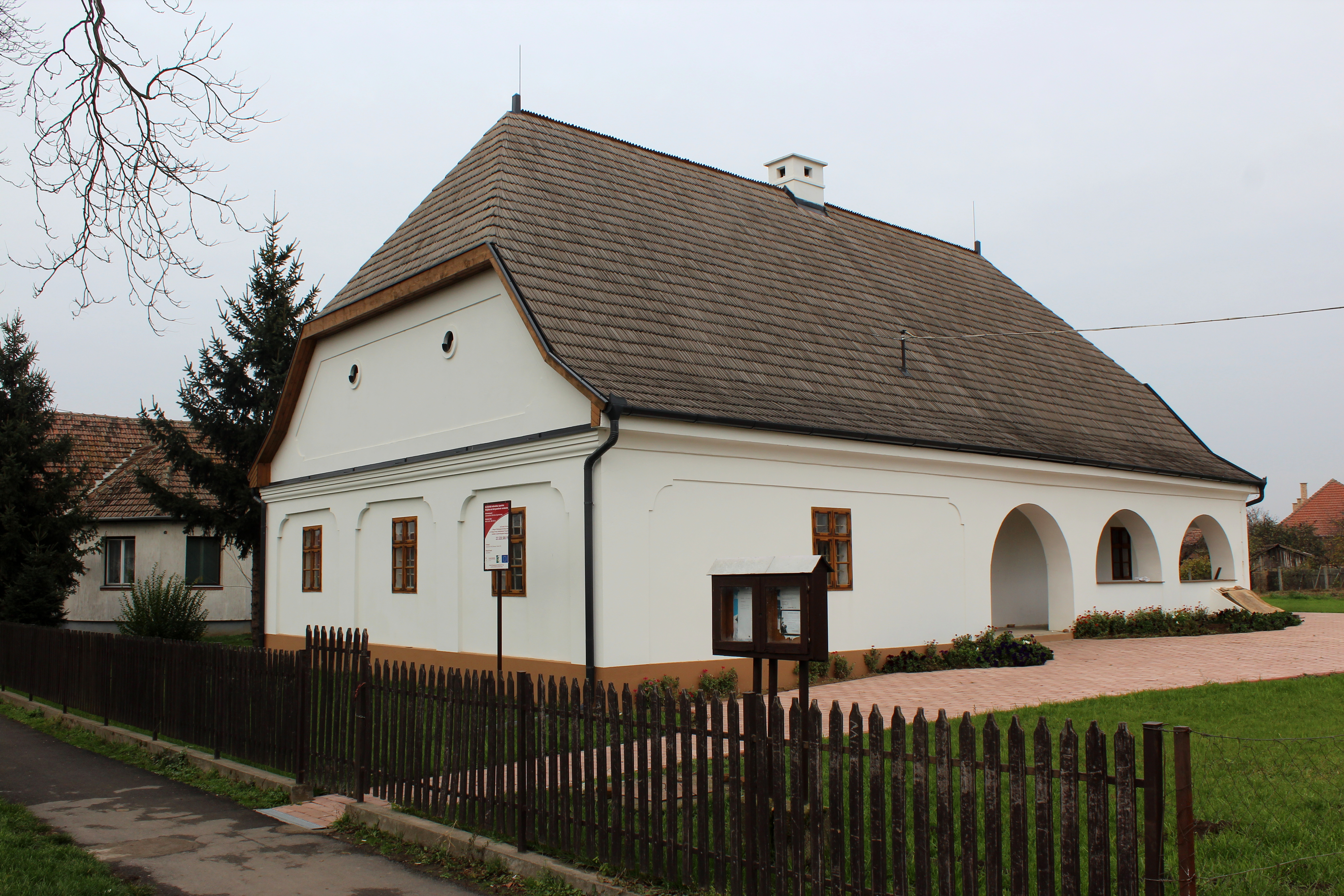
Reformed Parsonage in Ököritófülpös

== See also ==
- List of cities and towns of Hungary
