= Fire of Szatmárököritó =

1910 fire at the Hungarian village ball

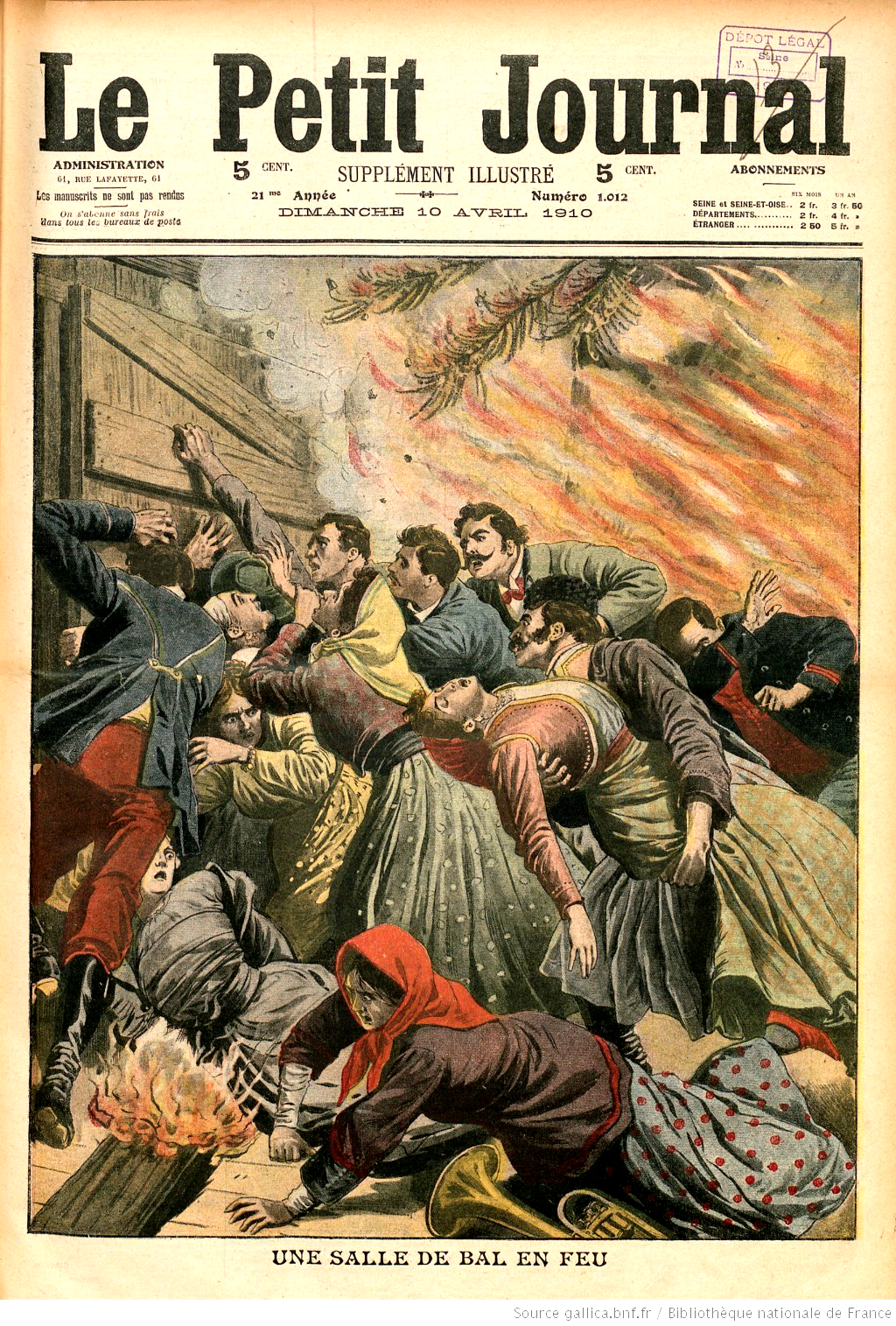
- Illustration of the disaster in the French magazine Le Petit Journal
- Date: 27 March 1910; 116 years ago
- Time: Around 12:00 pm
- Location: Szatmárököritó, Austro-Hungarian Empire (present-day Hungary); 47.918719°N 22.503474°E
- Cause: Inflamation of one of the decoration lamps
- Outcome: Barn completely destroyed
- Deaths: at least 312
- Injuries: at least 99

The Fire of Szatmárököritó was a disaster that occurred on March 27, 1910, in the village of Szatmárököritó, Szatmár County, Kingdom of Hungary at the era of the Austro-Hungarian Empire. The local granary barn used as a venue of large Easter dancing feast caught fire while a crowd of hundreds was celebrating inside. The fire claimed 312 lives, making it the deadliest fire in the country's history to this day.

The fire broke out around midnight, in the middle of the event, in a object owned by local farmer Benjámin Schwarz, who also operated a tavern in Szatmárököritó. The wooden structure—already over fifty years old and in poor condition—had previously served as a venue for such event or harvest balls. Most of the building's doors were locked when the fire started, cutting off any escape route for the people inside. The crowd, surging in panic, could not fit through the single open door. Many perished not from the fire itself, but from being trampled or crushed to death by the fleeing masses. Although fire safety regulations existed at the time, the official investigations following the tragedy failed to identify those responsible; indeed, they declared that no one bore liability for the fire.

The tragedy resonated widely across the globe. Numerous foreign newspapers reported on the fire on their front pages. Furthermore, following the Titanic disaster, it was the accident with the second-highest death toll in Europe at the time.

== Prelude ==
=== Szatmárököritó tavern barn ===
The main village square of Szatmárököritó, burned barn in the background

Szatmárököritó village was among the poorest settlements in the region; in 1910, it had a population of roughly two to three thousand, predominantly of the Reformed faith. At the time, this type of large-scale village dance event was still a relatively new phenomenon in Hungary, and the locals were eager to impress, driven by the novelty of this fashionable custom. Magistrates of Szatmárököritó so decided to host a grand Easter dance ball intending to caught the attention the local residents, as well as those from neighboring villages. The choice of date was rather unusual—a fact that drew criticism from others. Certain religious publications of the era, such as the 1911 Kalendar Szrca Jezusovoga, a Catholic almanac for the Slovenes of Hungary, specifically took issue with the fact that people were celebrating during Easter, a time considered a major holy day even among Calvinists.

The venue barn was built in 1855. It was roughly 25 meters long and 10 meters wide, with a floor area of approximately 250 square meters.[3] Thanks to its spacious interior, it frequently hosted such events, as there were few other suitable places available in the village. The barn also served as a stopping point for carters traveling between Nyírbátor and Szatmárnémeti (present-day Satu Mare, Romania). However, the building itself had a bad reputation. Locals viewed it as a cursed place, as it had been the scene of numerous crimes in the more than half-century since its construction. For instance, during a festivity held there in 1886, no fewer than five people were killed in a brawl, and twenty-six others were injured.

The barn had two large entrances, both of which were obstructed by bandstands and flooring at the time the fire broke out. There were several other exits as well, but only the single entrance where the village magistrate sold tickets was open. Widely accepted view is that the doors were locked to keep out loiterers and gatecrashers who lacked admission tickets. Decorations from the previous harvest ball were still hanging in the barn, including ornaments made of oak branches that were already drying out. For the occasion, pine boughs were primarily used for decoration, though paper flags were also made and kerosene lamps were set up. The barn itself was already dilapidated; its wooden structure built of adobe had dried out, featured a thatched roof, while the beams were coated with pitch. Furthermore, the event organizers failed to thoroughly clean the building; instead, they mostly swept the grain and straw debris left over from the previous harvest into the corners, rendering the barn a fire hazard from the very start. Furthermore, the interior was illuminated by large, candle-lit lanterns made of pig bladders, as well as kerosene lamps, making the event set completely inadequate in terms of fire safety.

== Accident ==
=== Ball starts ===
At the Sunday evening of 27 March 1910 people were arriving to Szatmárököritó for the ball from eighteen surrounding villages. Young people were accompanied by their parents, bringing the total number of attendees to approximately 650. At the small side entrance visitors were feed 1 Austro-Hungarian crown, while family tickets cost 3 crowns (by the evening, some 460–470 crowns had been collected).

The organizers set up the bandstand in front of the large gate at one end of the barn, effectively blocking the main entrance. At the large gate at the other end of the barn, a long bench had been placed against the walls and nailed down, blocking that entrance as well. These benches were intended for onlookers and relatives who could not gain entry to the festivities. Two musical groups, brass and string one, were about to play there. One of these was a local group, established just a few months earlier, and the ball was intended to be their debut. The musicians had purchased their instruments using a 1,000-crown loan and planned to cover the repayments with the proceeds from the ball. They had only recently learned to play, having attended a course that cost 200 crowns.

=== Fire outbreak ===
The festivities were proceeding in high spirits when, around midnight, one of the bladder lanterns caught fire. Lajos Pinczés, a clarinet player, survivor of the disaster, eyewitnessed the burning lantern, but the guests paid little attention to it; it was not uncommon for such bladder lanterns to catch fire, as the wind would often sway them back and forth.

A hussar among the revelers, later widely identified as Dániel Pongó, had his sabre at hand and attempted to cut down the lantern so the fire could be stamped out on the ground. Pongó assumed the lantern was secured to the beam with string, but it was actually fastened with wire; consequently, the sword stroke sent the burning bladder flying upward against the thatched roof, and the dry straw instantly burst into flames. Soon, the resinous pine boughs and paper ornaments used for decoration also inflamed (contemporary newspapers reported that the decorative boughs ignited first, and the straw roof caught fire only afterward).

At this point, nothing could stop the rapidly spreading fire; presumably, there was no water at hand. The tar-coated beams were so dry that they, too, burst into flames in moments. The fire intensified with such speed and ferocity that burning fragments of the roof structure soon began raining down on the people inside, who were seized by panic, their cries and wails filling the air. In the ensuing chaos, more blowtorches and kerosene lamps were knocked over, igniting further fires in the already hazardous space, and the flames quickly engulfed the entire barn. Old canvas sacks, tarpaulins used for drying grain, and other tattered rags that had not been cleared from the barn also caught fire.

=== Exit tragedy ===
Dance of death of Oekorito (Illustrierte Kronen Zeitung, 30 March 1910)

The crowd attempted a frantic escape, initially trying to exit through a side door. A bottleneck quickly formed due to the narrowness of the entrance caused the bottleneck effect and stuck people were leaving the place very slowly. There was no other way out of the barn: one large gate was blocked by the bandstand, while the opposite gate was obstructed by a heavy, nailed-down wooden band stage erected in front of it. Although the people managed to break through this latter gate – a feat reportedly achieved by József Farkas, a kontrabass player of exceptional physical strength – many stumbled and fell over the nailed-down flooring. According to eyewitnesses, the chaotic crush resulted in a pile of bodies two meters high, effectively blocking the other exit. Those trapped beneath the mounting pile of bodies were largely crushed to death; those who remained on top mostly burned to death, struck by burning fragments of wood and beams falling from the roof. However, a few people managed to scramble up the heap to an opening in the barn, located about three meters high, and leap outside. It is recorded that 12-year-old Kálmán Kerezsi was hoisted onto the top of the human pile three times; he eventually succeeded in making his way out through the opening, becoming one of the few who escaped a from this part of the building. Some of the people standing outside only compounded the disaster; upon seeing the fire break out, they resolved to enter the building to assist the revelers whose lives were in peril. They did this during the most critical moment, precisely when those inside were attempting to flee through the small door and the large gate that had been broken open, resulting in a collision between those trying to escape and those rushing in to help. Some may have attempted to flee by clinging to the people in front of them, hoping to be pulled out of the burning barn. Yet, due to the crush at the entrance, those in front could not get out; in fact, the people behind them, clinging on for dear life, actually dragged them back straight into the fire.

The ruins of the burnt barn, 1910 (photographed by Gyula Jelfy, Vasárnapi Ujság magazine)

The pitch burning on the beams not only fueled the rapidly spreading blaze but also generated a cloud of toxic, dark smoke. Many suffered smoke inhalation—which likely caused the deaths of quite a few—while others were simply blinded permanently by the billowing smoke. According to Pastor Kovács, some victims managed to get out of the building alive but collapsed on the ground, burned, as their clothes were already ablaze. Young women, in particular, wore garments made of lightweight, cheap fabrics that proved highly flammable in the fire. One local woman, Mrs. Pál Kuritán, ran with her burning clothes as far as the Mácsai farmstead, located few hundred meters away, where she finally collapsed and died. There was even a victim who ran with a burning body all the way to the neighboring village of Fülpösdaróc (a distance of roughly 5 km) before finally succumbing. Some tried to extinguish the flames in nearby puddles, but to no avail. Others threw themselves into wells. Many bodies were discovered near the foundations of nearby houses and in the gardens. These burning, fleeing individuals set fire to other structures, such as other barns, raising fears that a conflagration might engulf the entire village of Ököritó.

Eyewitnesses reported numerous harrowing scenes. For instance, a father who was outside the barn rushed in and managed to rescue one of his daughters. He then went back for his other daughter but could not get out; both perished in the fire. Another individual successfully rescued eight people but became trapped while attempting to save a ninth, dying alongside them. One man pulled fifteen people from the crushing mass of bodies while searching for his wife, who was trapped at the very bottom. He had nearly pulled her out by the hand when the surging crowd overwhelmed him, and both of them died.

It took a mere twenty minutes for the fire to reduce the entire barn to ashes; by the following day, nothing remained but ten to twelve charred, smoldering posts that had once supported the roof.

== Aftermath ==
=== First response ===
Standing corpses – Firefighters extinguish the embers (Illustrierte Kronen Zeitung, 30 March 1910)

Upon hearing news of the fire, the k. k. gendarmerie and Dr. László Képessy, the chief magistrate of Csenger, rushed to the scene accompanied by two doctors. Three additional doctors arrived from Mátészalka with Chief Magistrate László Péchy to assist the injured. There were no hospital institutions around, so even hospitals in Budapest offered assistance, Aladár Ilosvay, the Deputy Chief of Szatmár County, declined the offer. Meanwhile, the County Lord Lieutenant, Adorján Csaba, refused to visit the scene until the dead had been buried, claiming he could not emotionally bear the presumably horrific sight. The fire could not be properly extinguished; the village's fire pump had broken down, necessitating a call for firefighting assistance from the village of Kocsord.

To facilitate their treatment, some of the injured were transported to the nearby villages of Győrtelek and Géberjén. Chaos then engulfed Szatmárököritó in the wake of the tragedy. As numerous rumors about the fire began to circulate, including speculation of deliberate arson, crowds from the surrounding area flocked to the village in search of their relatives. Consequently, tensions escalated to a breaking point, fueling intense emotions. Many feared that riots might break out, prompting officials to consider calling in the military for assistance. Ultimately, however, the presence of the gendarmerie proved sufficient to restore order.

=== Victims ===
The agnosing of the dead (Illustrierte Kronen Zeitung, 30 March 1910)

Three hundred and twelve people died in the fire, and ninety-nine were injured. The majority of the deceased (over 200) were women, most of them unmarried young ones, who were at a disadvantage when trying to escape the flames due to their lesser physical strength. Among the local victims alone, sixty-eight were under the age of fifteen. In the chaos caused by the panic, people focused almost exclusively on themselves, often attempting to save their own lives at the expense of others. Also a significant number of the musicians performing at the festivities also lost their lives in the fire. Sámuel Pótor, the magistrate of Ököritó, who had been collecting tickets at the only open entrance, lost his mother and four of his children, while his wife was seriously injured. Since medical care was not free, many of the wounded—living in deep poverty—did not seek help for days; they only did so after learning that, in this exceptional case, treatment would be provided entirely free of charge. For many, the delay in receiving medical attention resulted in severe consequences, such as death or permanent disability. Many died later from injuries sustained in the fire or from smoke inhalation, most often because they had sought medical attention too late. The final victim passed away on April 21 after enduring horrific suffering caused by burn injuries. The bodies of 126 victims were so badly charred that identification was impossible; consequently, they were interred in a mass grave at the cemetery, their remains transported there on some sixteen to thirty wagons. Although slaked lime was scattered into the grave, the quantity proved insufficient—the stench of decomposing bodies seeped up through the earth—so the grave was reopened two days later to add more lime.

1. The posts of the burned-down barn. 2. The unfortunate mothers of Ököritó vacated their homes. 3. The head of the funeral procession. 4. The transport of the dead to their homes. 5. Burial in the cemetery. 6. The rows of graves of the victims.

For many survivors and residuaries, the shock resulted in lifelong psychological trauma. The case of Zsigmond Farkas, a resident of Nagyecsed whose wife and only daughter perished in the fire, illustrates this all too well; the man suffered a nervous breakdown and hanged himself that very day. The newspaper Mátészalka also reported about a miraculous finding was found alive beneath one of the benches.

=== Investigation ===
The investigation into the incident was led by Ignác Gál, a gendarmerie sergeant from Csenger. To determine the exact number of victims, authorities not only examined the remains found at the scene but also went from house to house inquiring whether any family members were missing, as it was impossible to be certain whether some bodies had been completely consumed by the fire.

The public largely held Dániel Pongó, who had also lost his life in the fire, responsible for the tragedy. Such immense pressure was brought to bear on Pongó’s parents and even his relatives that they were forced to move away from Ököritó. According to Gusztáv Kovács, the scene was horrific—not only due to the multitude of victims who had suffered agonizing deaths but also because of the sight of the relatives’ inhumane emotional anguish.

Beyond Pongó’s negligence, it was stated that the building was fundamentally unsafe for a mass gathering of this kind, a point frequently raised by contemporary newspapers, which clearly held the event organizers accountable. The barn itself was a highly flammable structure and was packed with other combustible materials (kerosene, grain dust, straw, paper, pine boughs, canvas, etc.). Preliminary investigations identified the building's fire-prone structure and the improper arrangement of seating as key issues. It was stated that the organizers, who likely focused solely on the spectacle and publicity rather than safety, committed, or may have committed, numerous other acts of negligence; consequently, even a tiny flame could easily have sparked a similar fire. Such a trigger could have been something as simple as smoking or the smoldering ash from a flare that had been stepped on.

While the victims' families and the survivors did receive financial aid, this came primarily from private donations made by foreigners, private citizens, or high-ranking officials, whereas the state and the county provided little assistance.

It remains unclear why most of the doors to the barn serving as the venue for the wedding ball were locked. Various theories and rumors regarding this persist to this day.However, there were those who believe the fire was a case of deliberate arson, suggesting this was the reason the other entrances had been blocked off.

=== Memory ===
The tragedy caused profound shock across every country in Europe. Prominent foreign newspapers, such as the French Le Petit Journal, The New York Times, Neues Wiener Tagblatt reported on the event on their front pages. Austrian press recalled the fire at the Ringtheater in the imperial capital in December 1881, which had also claimed around four hundred of lives. The Austrian, French, and Italian governments, as well as Austro-Hungarian Emperor Franz Joseph I or German Emperor Wilhelm II, the city leaders of Vienna, Paris, Berlin, and several German states (such as Bavaria), expressed his condolences to the Hungarian government. Many people—including foreigners, such as French citizens who had learned of the fire through Le Petit Journal traveled personally to Szatmár to pay their respects to the victims on site.

Coat of arms of Ököritófülpös

According to research by István Bálint, a retired elementary school principal from Ököritófülpös, the settlement turned into a ghost town for years; the population was decimated, leaving behind countless orphans and wiping out entire families. There were families that lost every single one of their children. Historical records indicate there were 69 orphaned children in Ököritó. The funerals for the victims took place over the course of a week in Szatmárököritó and the surrounding settlements. For five years, right up until the World War I, no military conscription took place in the village; for six years, no weddings were held there (couples preferred to marry in neighboring parishes); and for ten years, no dances were organized, due to the haunting memory of the terrible tragedy that had left such a deep scar.

After the World War, the village erected a memorial at the site for the victims of the tragedy, and commemorations have been held there every year since. A single, massive headstone was raised over the mass grave containing the unidentified victims. The burnt-down barn was never rebuilt; a memorial park and a commemorative column now stand on the site. On the centenary of the fire, the names of the 126 originally unidentified victims—determined through subsequent research based on civil registry records—were added to the memorial over the mass grave.

A stylized image of the burning barn was later added at the coat of arms of Ököritófülpös village.

Hungarian journalist Zsigmond Móricz personally visited the place of the event and then addressed the Ököritó disaster in a detailed dedicated study for the journal Nyugat, later published as a separate work titled A fáklya (The Torch). In his work he described the event and also critisised the authorities, absence of precautions and loosy attentional and financial aid response. Local teacher István Bálint also did a great deal at the local level to investigate the event accurately and objectively, striving to distinguish actual facts from hearsay.

To a certain extent, the tragedy served as a lesson for the Hungarian fire safety system of the time. It was precisely because of the Ököritó tragedy that Hungarian politician Kunó Klebelsberg issued a decree requiring outward-opening doors in all public venues.

== See also ==
- Szatmár County
- History of Hungary
- List of building or structure fires

== Biography ==
- Gyapjas, János (2020). Ököritó 1910. A tragikus tűzeset elemzése (PDF) (in Hungarian). Paks. pp. 88–95.
- Kósa, László. A Cultural History of Hungary: In the Nineteenth and Twentieth Centuries. Corvina, 2000, p. 13-14.
