= Miklós Moldván =

Hungarian footballer

Personal information
- Date of birth: 3 October 1954 (age 72)
- Place of birth: Hodász, Hungary
- Position: Midfielder

Senior career*
Years	Team	Apps	(Gls)
1970–1971	III. Kerületi TVE		
1972–1974	Bp. Építők		
1975–1977	H. Kilián FSE		
1977	Záhony		
1977–1986	Nyíregyházi VSSC	122	(11)
1986–1988	FC Tatabánya	38	(1)
1988–1991	Debreceni VSC		
1991–1992	Szolnoki MÁV FC		
1993-?	Kemecse SE		

International career
1982	Hungary	3	(0)

Managerial career
- 1993-?: Kemecse SE
- * Club domestic league appearances and goals

Miklós Moldován (born 3 October 1954) is a Hungarian former professional footballer who played as a midfielder, later became a football coach. He was a member of the Hungary national team.

== Club career ==
With FC Tatabánya Moldován finished second in Nemzeti Bajnokság I in the 1987–88 season and third in the 1986–87 season.

== International career ==
In 1982 Moldován played three times for the Hungary national team.

== Coaching career ==
From 1993 Moldován was player-coach of Kemecse.
