= Sándor Bökönyi =

Hungarian archaeologist (1926–1994)

Sándor Bökönyi (17 March 1926 – 25 December 1994) was a Hungarian archaeologist who specialized in zooarchaeology, the study of animal remains associated with human settlements. He was especially interested in the domestication and spread of horses in human history.

Bökönyi was born in Vállaj on the border of Hungary and Romania and went to a content in Debrecen. In 1944 went to the University of Budapest and studied veterinary medicine and graduated in 1950. He then became a curator of archaeology at the National Museum in Budapest. He began to examine archaeological material and in 1966 he defended his kandidatus and received a doctorate in 1969. In 1973 he joined the Archaeological Institute at the Academy of Hungarian Science, becoming its director in 1979. He published 11 monographs and numerous other works primarily on the animal remains and their interpretation in archaeology. He taught at the University of Budapest from 1951 and was an honorary professor from 1984.
