= Meshulam =

Meshulam may refer to:

- Meshulam Dovid Soloveitchik (known as Reb or Rav Dovid, born 1921), Orthodox rabbi and rosh yeshiva
- Meshulam Gross or Grosz (1863–1947), businessman, inventor and learned layman, author of two sefarim of Torah novellae
- Meshulam Nahari (born 1951), rabbi, Israeli politician
- Meshulam Riklis (1923–2019), Israeli businessman
- Uzi Meshulam (1952–2013), rabbi from Yehud, leader of a radical group of Yemenite Jews
