= Nyírbátor District =

Coordinates: 47.7833°N 22.1500°E

Nyírbátor District Nyírbátori járás
- Districts of Hungary
- Coat of arms

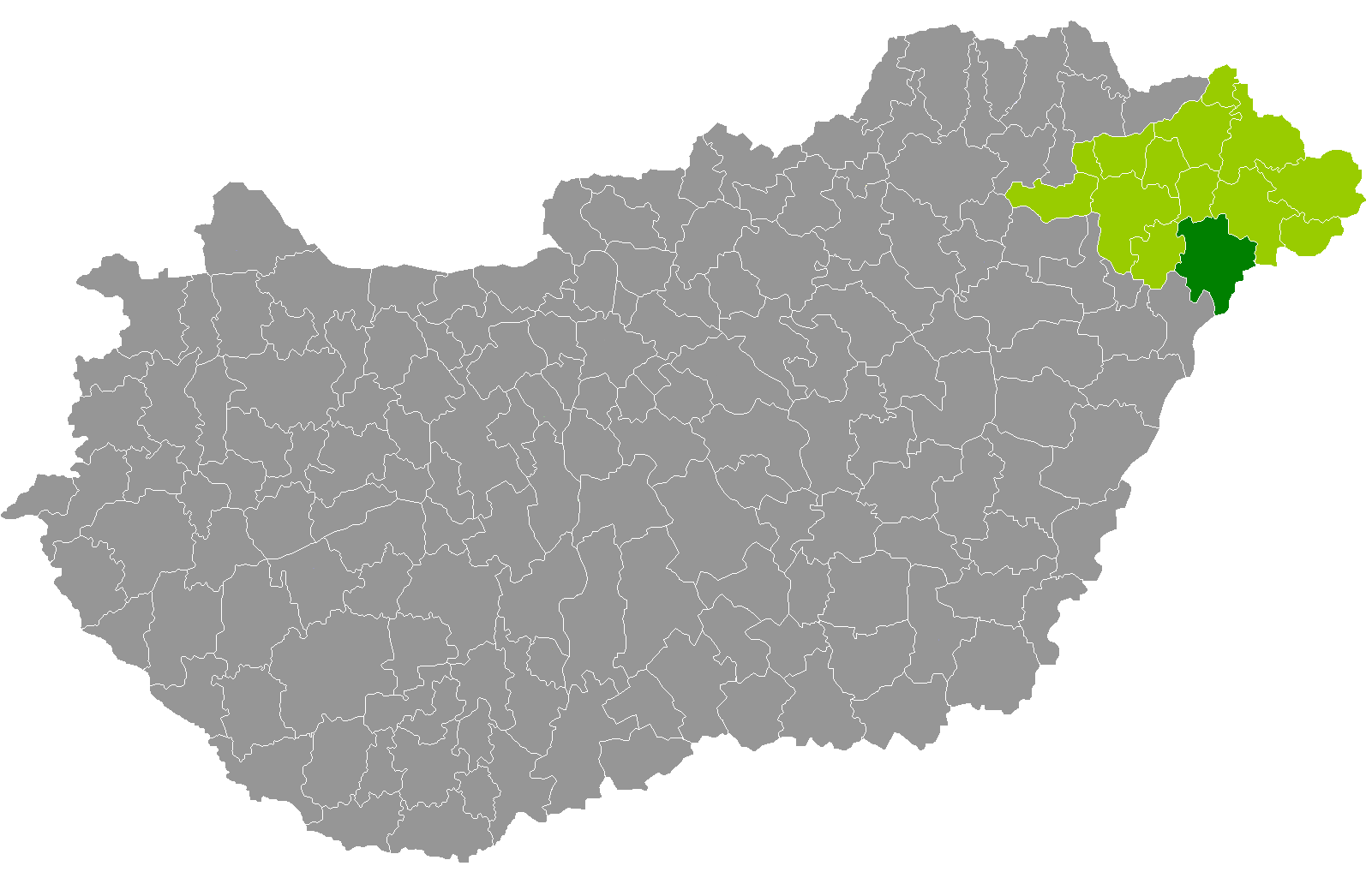
- Nyírbátor District within Hungary and Szabolcs-Szatmár-Bereg County.
- Country: Hungary
- County: Szabolcs-Szatmár-Bereg
- District seat: Nyírbátor

Area
  - Total: 695.94 km^{2} (268.70 sq mi)
  - Rank: 3rd in Szabolcs-Szatmár-Bereg

Population (2011 census)
  - Total: 43,040
  - Rank: 4th in Szabolcs-Szatmár-Bereg
  - Density: 62/km^{2} (160/sq mi)

Nyírbátor (Hungarian: Nyírbátori járás) is a district in south-eastern part of Szabolcs-Szatmár-Bereg County. Nyírbátor is also the name of the town where the district seat is found. The district is located in the Northern Great Plain Statistical Region. This district is a part of Nyírség geographical region.

== Geography ==
Nyírbátor District borders with Baktalórántháza District and Mátészalka District to the north, the Romanian county of Satu Mare to the east, Romanian county of Bihor and Nyíradony District (Hajdú-Bihar County) to the south, Nagykálló District to the west. The number of the inhabited places in Nyírbátor District is 20.

== Municipalities ==
The district has 3 towns, 2 large villages and 15 villages. (ordered by population, as of 1 January 2013)

- Bátorliget (691)
- Encsencs (1,977)
- Kisléta (1,864)
- **Máriapócs** (2,155)
- **Nyírbátor** (12,399) – district seat
- Nyírbéltek (2,990)
- Nyírbogát (3,143)
- Nyírcsászári (1,197)
- Nyírderzs (651)
- Nyírgelse (1,159)
- Nyírgyulaj (2,045)
- **Nyírlugos** (2,824)
- Nyírmihálydi (2,201)
- Nyírpilis (798)
- Nyírvasvári (1,972)
- Ömböly (411)
- Penészlek (978)
- Piricse (1,810)
- Pócspetri (1,681)
- Terem (611)

The bolded municipalities are cities, italics municipalities are large villages.

== Demographics ==
Religion in Nyírbátor District (2011 census)
1. Greek Catholicism (29.1%)
2. Catholic Church (19.9%)
3. Calvinism (26.4%)
4. Lutheranism (0.10%)
5. Other religions (0.70%)
6. Non-religious (5.40%)
7. Atheists (0.30%)
8. Undeclared (18.1%)

In 2011, it had a population of 43,040 and the population density was 62/km^{2}.

| Year | County population | Change |
|---|---|---|
| 2011 | 43,040 | n/a |

=== Ethnicity ===
Besides the Hungarian majority, the main minorities are the Roma (approx. 6,000) and Romanian (100).

Total population (2011 census): 43,040
Ethnic groups (2011 census): Identified themselves: 44,442 persons:

- Hungarians: 38,353 (86.30%)
- Gypsies: 5,570 (12.53%)
- Others and indefinable: 519 (1.17%)

Approx. 1,500 persons in Nyírbátor District did declare more than one ethnic group at the 2011 census.

=== Religion ===
Religious adherence in the county according to 2011 census:

- Catholic – 21,094 (Greek Catholic – 12,538; Roman Catholic – 8,556);
- Reformed – 11,364;
- Evangelical – 45;
- other religions – 314;
- Non-religious – 2,317;
- Atheism – 105;
- Undeclared – 7,801.

== Gallery ==
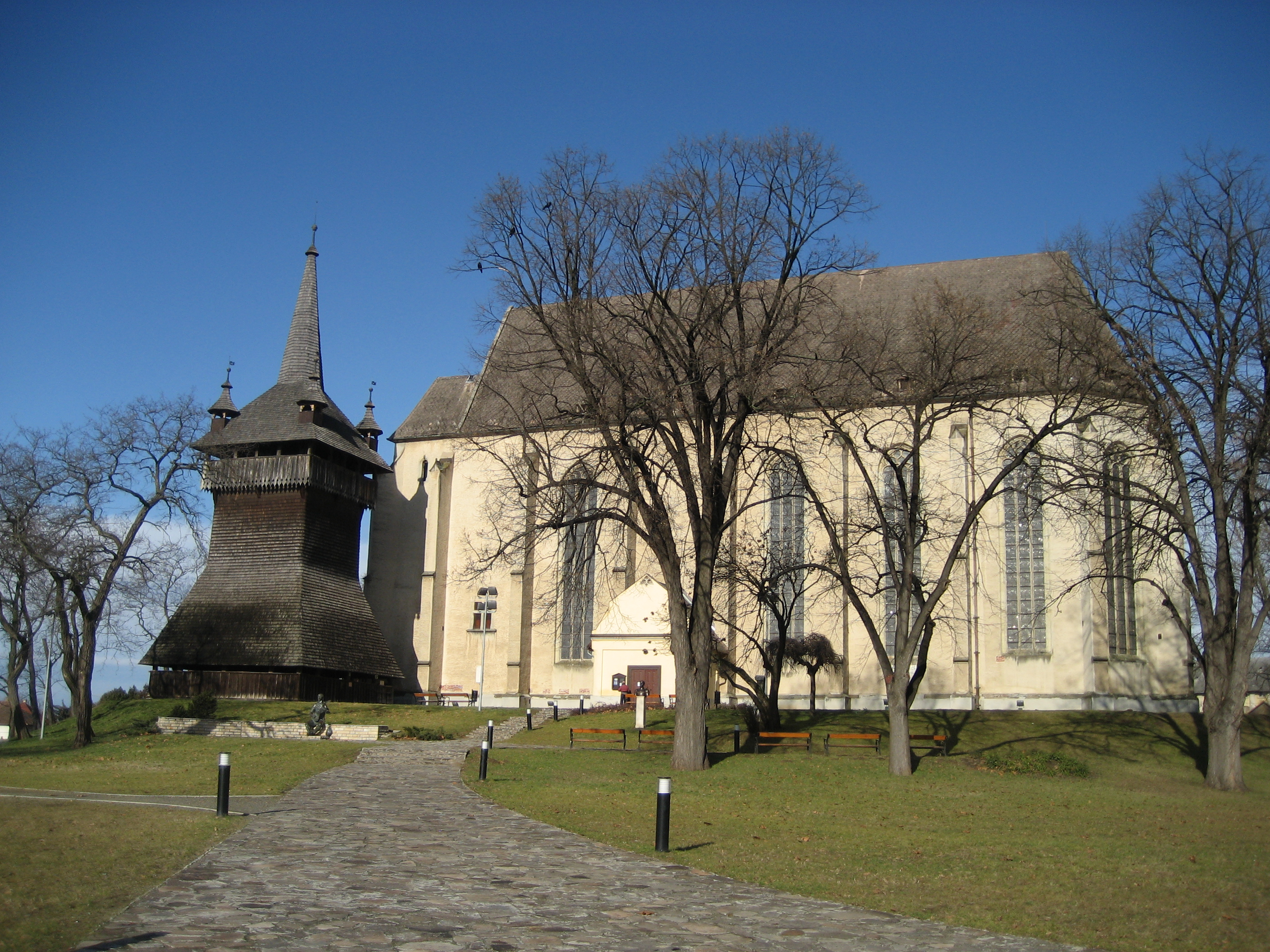
Nyírbátor, the district seat

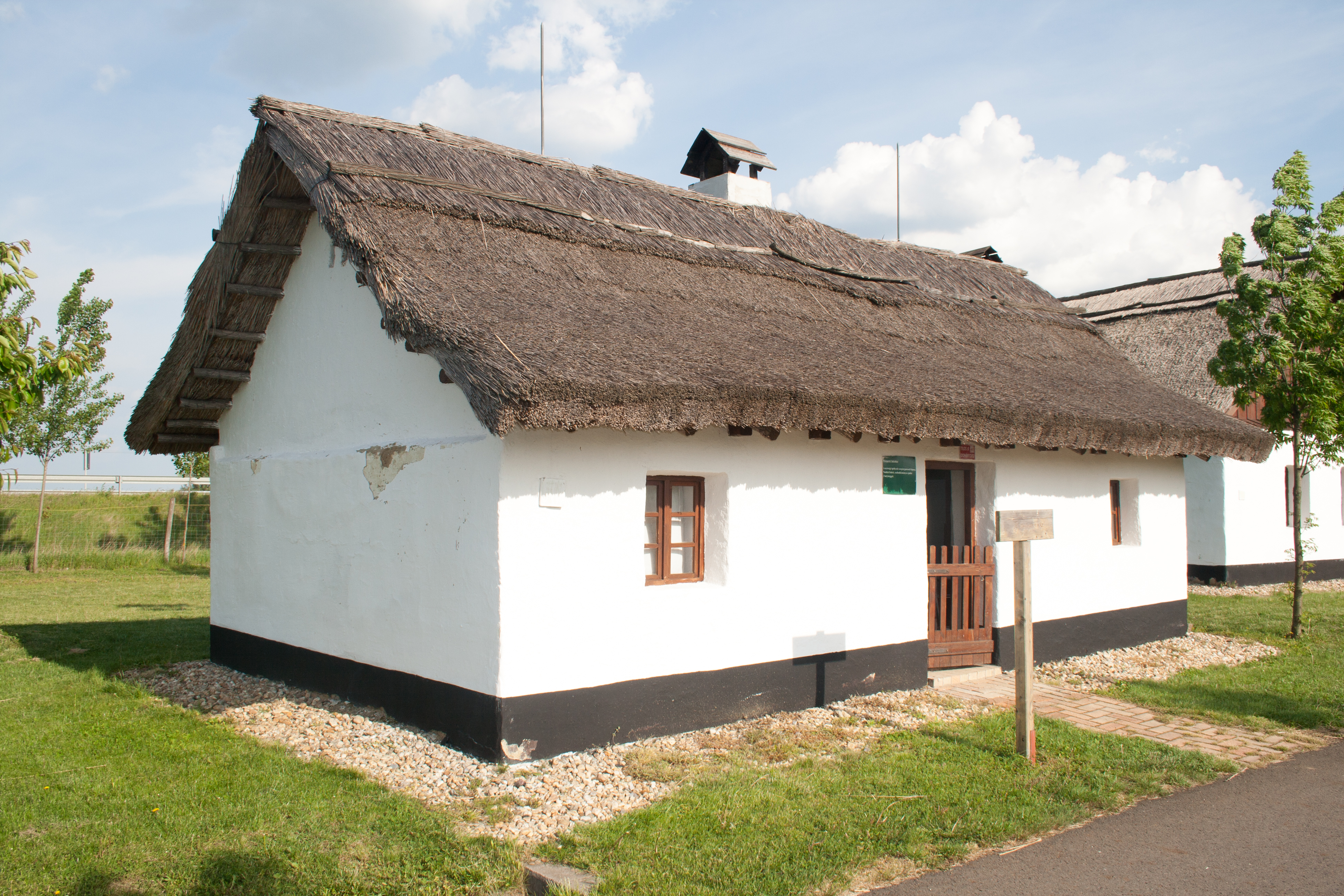
Traditional house from Pócspetri

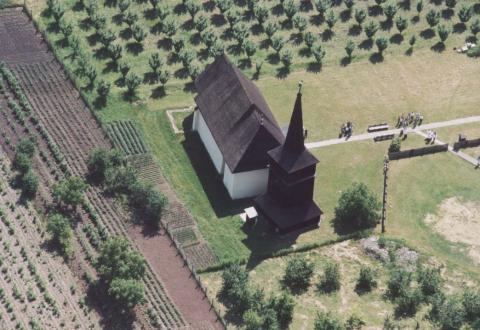
Aerial view of Nyírmihálydi

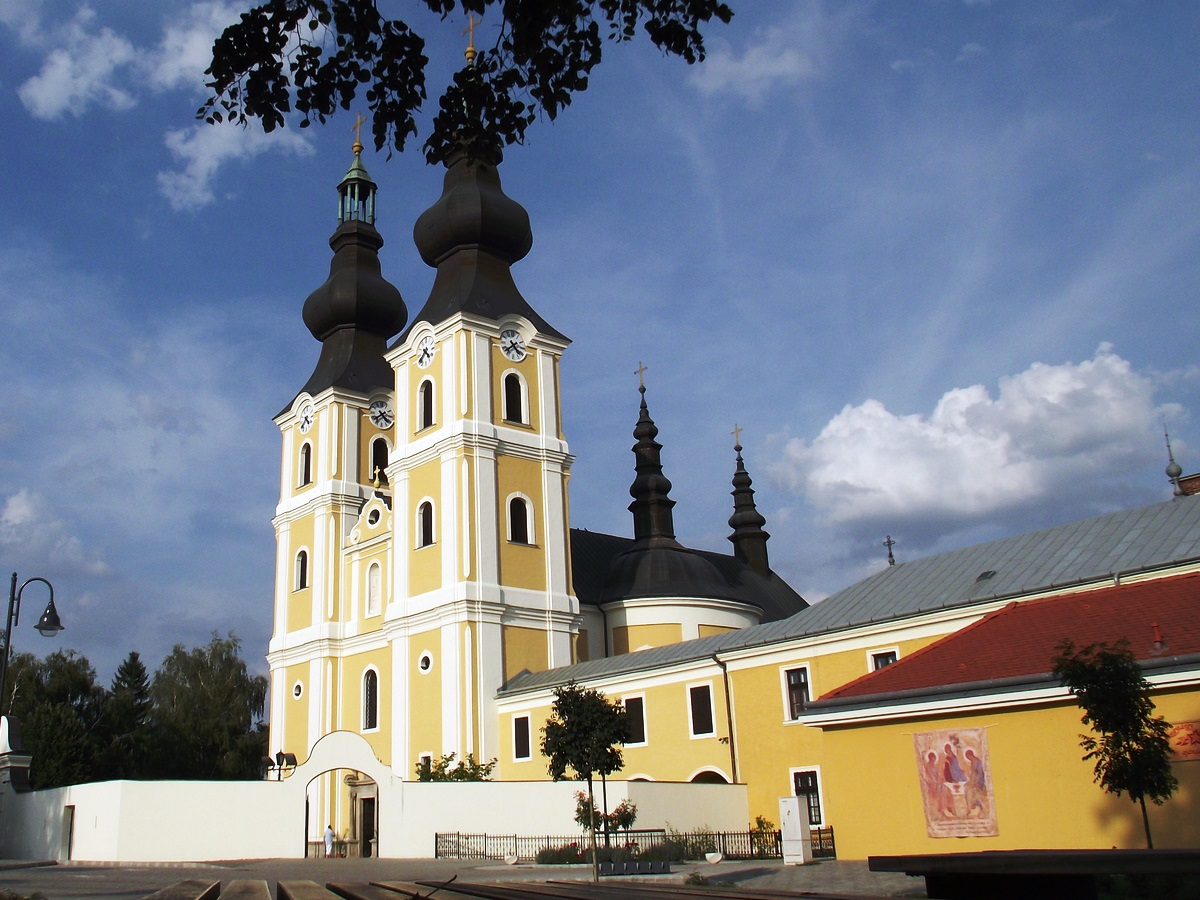
Greek Catholic Pilgrimage Church in Máriapócs

== See also ==
- List of cities and towns of Hungary
