= Mátészalka =

- Town
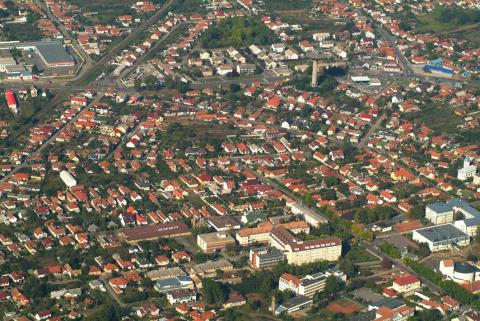
- Aerial view

- Flag Coat of arms

- Location within Hungary
- Coordinates: 47°57′00″N 22°19′00″E
- Country: Hungary
- County: Szabolcs-Szatmár-Bereg
- District: Mátészalka

Area
  - Total: 41.81 km^{2} (16.14 sq mi)

Population (2025)
  - Total: 14,848
  - Density: 355.1/km^{2} (919.8/sq mi)
- Time zone: UTC+1 (CET)
  - Summer (DST): UTC+2 (CEST)
- Postal code: 4700
- Area code: (+36) 44
- Website: www.mateszalka.hu

Mátészalka (Hungarian pronunciation: [ˈmaːteːˌsɒlkɒ]) is a town in Szabolcs-Szatmár-Bereg county, in the Northern Great Plain region of eastern Hungary. It is on the Kraszna River, 52 kilometers east of the county seat Nyiregyhaza.

== Geography ==
It covers an area of 41.81 km^{2} (16 sq mi) and has a population of 14,848 people (2025).

The town was the birthplace of actor Tony Curtis' father, Emanuel Schwartz.

== Population ==
In 2022, the population of Mátészalka was nearly 91.8% Hungarian, 2.5% Romani, 0.6% German, and 8% other minorities.

== History ==
Mátészalka was created from the merger of two large villages: Máté, founded in 1231 and Szalka, created in 1268. From the fifteenth century, Mátészalka was a market settlement. From 1920 - 1950 it was the seat of the authorities of some of the committees Szatmár, Ugocsa and Bereg remaining in Hungary after the Trianon Treaty. In 1969 Mátészalka received city rights. The city is the seat of the regional Szatmári Múzeum.

The actor Tony Curtis was born Bernard Schwarz, and his parents were from Mátészalka. His daughter, Jamie Lee Curtis, helped to refurbish the synagogue, which is where her grandparents worshipped. She also attended the opening of the Tony Curtis Memorial Museum and Cafe, which is located in Mátészalka. About 1,500 Jews from the town were taken to Auschwitz in 1944, after the Nazis occupied Hungary that March. In 1946, about 150 Jews returned, but many left after the 1956 Hungarian Revolution.

== Twin towns – sister cities ==
Mátészalka is twinned with:

- Carei, Romania
- Humenné, Slovakia
- Kolbuszowa, Poland
- Mukachevo, Ukraine
- Oberkochen, Germany
- Vittoria, Italy
- Zevenaar, Netherlands
