= Wooden Belfry of Nyírbátor =

In Calvinist church in Hungry

Near the South-West corner of the Calvinist Church in the Medieval Hungarian market-town Nyírbátor stands the unique 17th century Late-Renaissance wooden belfry, a masterpiece of Transylvanian joinery, which is the oldest and the largest of its kind in Hungary. Its shingled skirting and gallery give the impression of a bastion. With its artistic carvings it is a majestic piece of early-seventeenth century folk architecture.

== History ==
Following the famous 1479 Kenyérmező victory against joint forces of Wallachia and the Turkish Ottoman Empire, Stephen V Báthory Prince of Transylvania commissioned the building of the beautiful Gothic church named after St George, as well as a family castle and a Franciscan Monastery. Buildings works started in the 1480s in late gothic style, and were completed in 1511, wearing proofs of the Italian Renaissance, possibly fashioned after King Matthias’ Visegrad palace.

The Ecsed line of descent of the Báthory family converted to Calvinism in the mid 16th century, and together with the family the inhabitants of Nyírbátor and the church also became Calvinist.

Lord Chief Justice István Báthory moved the stele of his ancestor, the Prince of Transylvania to the Calvinist church from the monastery. His own stone sarcophagus, that was commissioned by Gábor Báthory Prince of Transylvania, was placed in the vault in 1605. The church was used as a sepulture by the Bethlen family. In 1640 Stephen and Peter Bethlen had a bell cast by George Weird of Eperjes. Transylvanian joiners built the wooden belfry to house it.

== Architecture ==
The basic area of the oak bell tower is ten by ten meters. Its height is 32 meters, including the top crescent supported by a steel rod, which complies with the customary 1:3 base:height ratio of Hungarian bell-towers. The carved planks reaching down from the gallery form a whispering gallery, which shows great artistic flair. The whole tower including all joints and nails is made of wood. The structure stands on nine pillars placed on a 16 section base grid of oak beams. The pillars that reach up to the gallery, the actual bell chamber, are divided into four sections by horizontal binding joists. The body of the tower is strengthened by a mass of strutting beams, diagonal and corner supports. The scarf-joints are executed traditionally, syphering with dovetail joints and mortised holes. Square headed wooden nails were used for securing the joints. A wooden staircase made up of three straight sections leads up to the gallery, interrupted by resting floors. The bell-house houses two bells hanging on separate belfries. The steep square based roof tops in an octagonal cap. There are four dainty circular turrets on the four corners of the roof structure. The anemoscopes on the quadrilateral turrets show the years: 1778, 1841, 1889 and 1928. These are dates of restoration. Belltowers of this kind were built throughout Eastern Hungary and Transylvania. Out of them all Nyírbátor's is the largest and most notable. The skirting of the roof and body are shingled. The contemporary bell bears reliefs of the four evangelists. According to the engraved script, it was cast by George Weird of Eperjes in 1640, and commissioned by Stephen and Peter Bethlen.
