= Mérk =

- Village
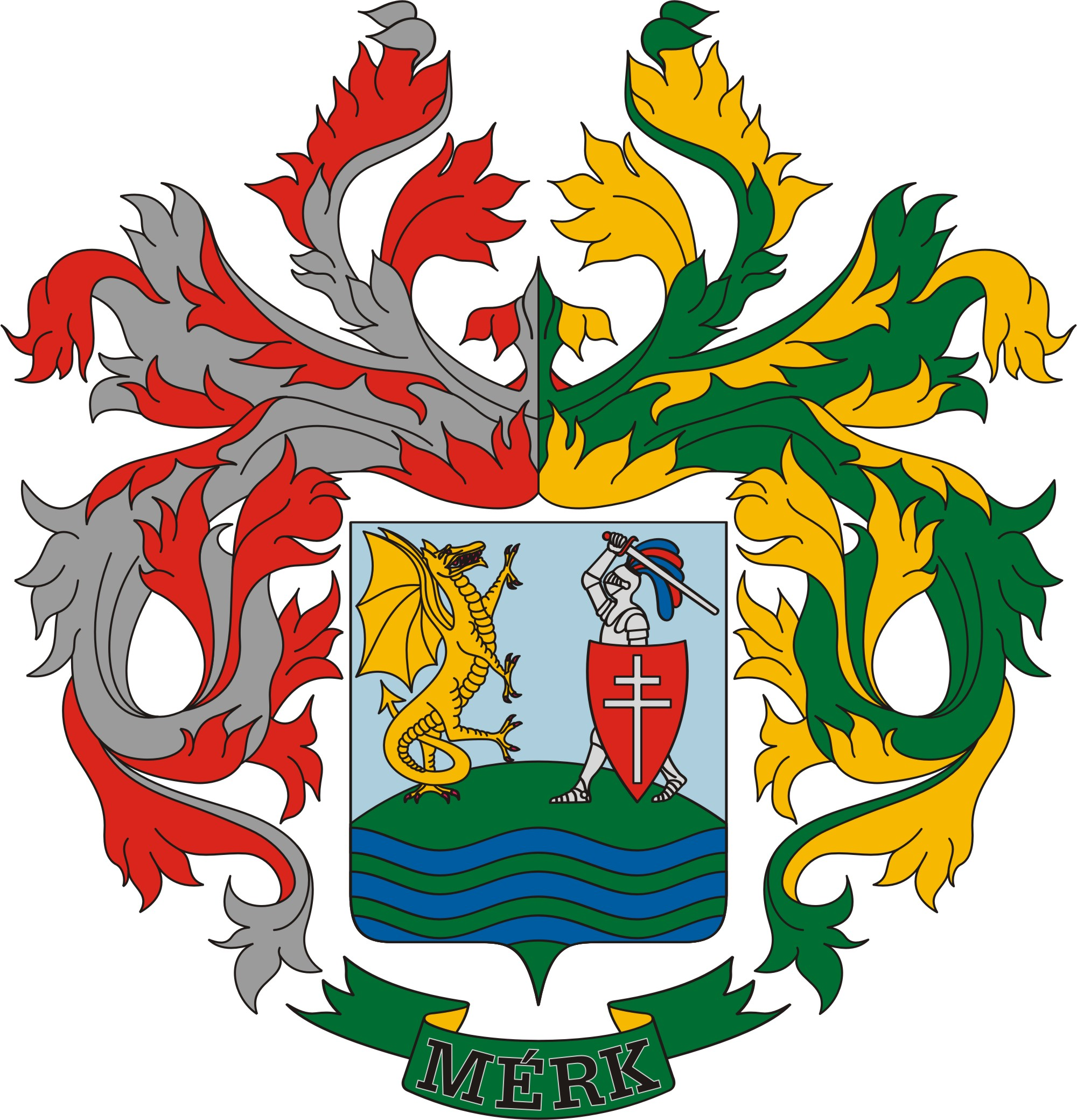
- Flag Coat of arms

- Location of Mérk in Hungary
- Coordinates: 47°47′N 22°22′E
- Country: Hungary
- Region: Northern Great Plain
- County: Szabolcs-Szatmár-Bereg

Area
  - Total: 25.08 km^{2} (9.68 sq mi)

Population (2012)
  - Total: 2,073
  - Density: 82.66/km^{2} (214.1/sq mi)
- Time zone: UTC+1 (CET)
  - Summer (DST): UTC+2 (CEST)
- Postal code: 4352
- Area code: +36 44
- Website: http://merk.hu/

Mérk is a village in Szabolcs-Szatmár-Bereg county, in the Northern Great Plain region of eastern Hungary.

== Geography ==
It covers an area of 25.08 km^{2} (9.68 sq mi) and has a population of 2073 people (2012).

The village of Mérk is situated 62 km (39 mi) southeast of the Hungarian town Nyíregyháza. This area is part of Szabolcs-Szatmár-Bereg county located in the northeast corner of Hungary. In 2012, Mérk had 2073 inhabitants. The number of houses in the community was 817. The village is close to the border between Hungary and Romania that crosses this area in an East to West direction at the River Kraszna. Geographically, the area constitutes a juncture of the sandy Nyírség Plain and the marshlands of Ecsed.

Art relics and tourist attractions in the village

- The Roman Catholic Church was erected in 1882-84 in honour of St. Peter and St. Paul (eclectic)
- The Protestant Church was erected between 1899 and 1914 (eclectic)
- The memorial that was erected in honor of the people died in World War II; it is located in the space between the two churches
- The tawdry barns (German folklore buildings)
- A collection of hunter József Janovszky's trophy collection.
