= Meshulam Gross =

Meshulam Fayish Tzvi (Herman) Gross or Grosz (Hebrew: משולם פייש צבי גראס) (1863–1947) was a businessman, inventor and a learned layman, author of two sefarim of Torah novellae, Nachlas Tzvi and Ateres Tzvi.

== Early life ==
Herman Grosz (as his name was then spelled) was born in Debrecen, Hungary, in 1863. Soon after, his family moved to Nyírbátor, where he was raised. His father, Reuven, was engaged in business, possibly as a breeder or trader of horses. As a young man, Meshulam reportedly was involved in "breaking" horses for his father.

It is not known which yeshivas he attended, although it is believed that much of his Torah learning was self acquired. In 1890 he married Leah Billiczer, daughter of Rabbi Amram Yishai Halevi Billiczer, Av Beth Din of Szerencs, Hungary, and a descendant of a long line of rabbis. The family originally came from Spain and reportedly were descendants of Rabbi Isaiah Horowitz (the Shelah HaKadosh, whose ancestry has been traced to Rashi and Rabbi Yochanan Hasandlar.

== Religious American businessman ==
Gross emigrated to the United States in 1893 and settled in New York's Lower East Side. After World War I, the family moved to Borough Park, Brooklyn.

After engaging in a variety of business ventures, he settled in the women's blouse business, which, after his retirement, was carried on by his sons into the 1950s. He viewed his business solely as a means of subsistence, for his true passion was Torah. He retired from business at a relatively young age to devote himself to Torah study and was supported by his sons.

He is remembered as sitting at his desk, in a book-lined study, with a "shivisi" sign in front of him and a number of sefarim opened before him. He rose many hours before dawn each day to learn and write. He was attentive and meticulous to beautifying religious observance, and paid particular attention to the selection of an etrog, the purchase of a beautiful etrog box, and the decoration of his sukkah, arguably one of the first in the country that had canvas walls. Although his son Moshe was the chazan of a large Orthodox synagogue only a block away, he refrained from going there because the Torah was not read from a central bimah.

== Torah works ==
His two sefarim, Nachlas Tzvi and Ateres Tzvi, contain original Torah thoughts on the Chumash. The profundity of his knowledge of Chumash, Navi, Talmud, Rishonim and Acharonim are readily apparent throughout. He combined an encyclopedic knowledge with an inventive and creative mind to develop highly original and novel interpretations of the Chumash. A student of the Zohar, he had a weekly chavrusa (learning partnership) to study Kabbalah with Rabbi Yosef Yitzchok Schneersohn, the Lubavitcher Rebbe, and he used this source liberally in his works.

His primary work, Nachlas Tzvi, although not widely known, includes approbations from exceptionally great and famous Torah luminaries, including Rabbi Yosef Tzvi Dushinsky, Av Beth Din of the Edah HaChareidis of Jerusalem; the Satmar Rebbe, Rabbi Yoel Teitelbaum; Rabbi Nachum Wiedenfeld of Dombrova, Poland (brother of the Tchebiner Rav); and Rabbi Avrohom Elyashiv (father of Rabbi Yosef Shalom Eliashiv).

== Inventions ==
He invented one of the first vending machines. For a penny it dispensed candy and a fortune card, and a monkey tipped his hat. He also developed a parve shortening made of coconut oil, and a device to keep food from burning. Patents were issued for many of his inventions. After World War II began, recognizing that lice was a serious problem for soldiers, he performed scientific experiments with mice, experimental and control groups, and developed a lice repellent which he offered to the Department of Defense; they opted, instead, for DDT.

== Death and legacy ==
He died on September 20, 1947 (6 Cheshvan 5708) and was buried in Mount Hebron Cemetery in Queens, New York. His family offers free copies of Nachlas Tzvi to anyone who commits to learning from it.
