= Nyírbátor =

- Town
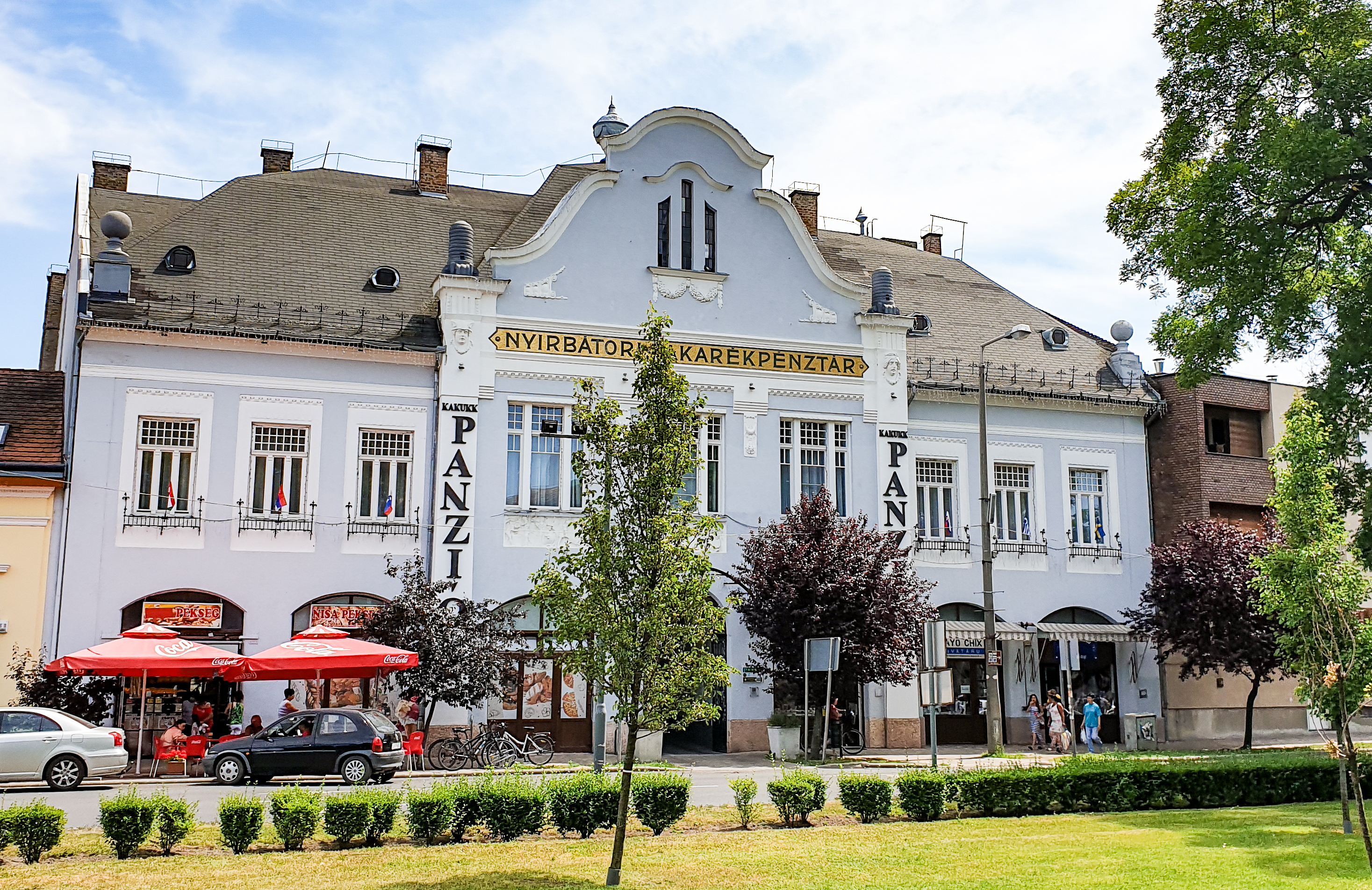
- Szabadság Square

- Flag Coat of arms

- Location within Hungary
- Coordinates: 47°50′N 22°08′E
- Country: Hungary
- County: Szabolcs-Szatmár-Bereg
- District: Nyírbátor

Area
  - Total: 66.73 km^{2} (25.76 sq mi)

Population (2015)
  - Total: 12,259
  - Density: 183.7/km^{2} (476/sq mi)
- Time zone: UTC+1 (CET)
  - Summer (DST): UTC+2 (CEST)
- Postal code: 4300
- Area code: (+36) 42
- Website: nyirbator.hu

Nyírbátor (Hungarian: [ˈɲiːrbaːtor]) is a town in Szabolcs–Szatmár–Bereg County, in the Northern Great Plain region of eastern Hungary. The town contains 15th- and 16th-century ecclesiastic and secular architectural heritage.

== Geography ==
It covers an area of 66.73 km^{2} (26 sq mi) and has a population of 12,259 (2015). The town forms the largest and most important population centre of the southern Nyírség region of Hungary.

== History ==
The first written record of the settlement dates from 1279. Its name is derived from the Old Turkish word batir, or Mongolian bator (originally meaning a "good hero" and corresponding to bátor in modern Hungarian). At that time, the ancestors of the Báthorys, the Gutkeled clan, already owned the land. The town became the administrative centre of their estates and also the family burial site. The family owned the town until the death of Gabriel Báthory, Prince of Transylvania, in 1613.

In 1549, the legates of King Ferdinand I and Isabella ceded Transylvania to the Kingdom of Hungary. During the decades that followed there was a lasting dispute over ownership of the town, with the local aristocrats more inclined to recognize the sovereignty of the ruling prince of Transylvania.

By the 18th century, the town had become impoverished. In the course of the 1872 reorganization of public administration it lost its city status, which it regained in 1973.

== Sights ==
The town is the site of several heritage buildings, the most well-known of which is what is now the Reformed Church. Built between 1488 and 1511, which is considered an example of International Gothic structures in Hungary. The late Renaissance-style belfry next to it is the largest wooden bell tower in the country.

Franciscan friars built their friary church around 1480 in a late Gothic style. Standing near the church is the building which now houses the István Báthori Museum. Originally a Baroque Minorite friary, it was built on the site of an earlier monastery.

== Sport ==
The association football club Nyírbátori FC is based in Nyírbátor.

== Photo gallery ==
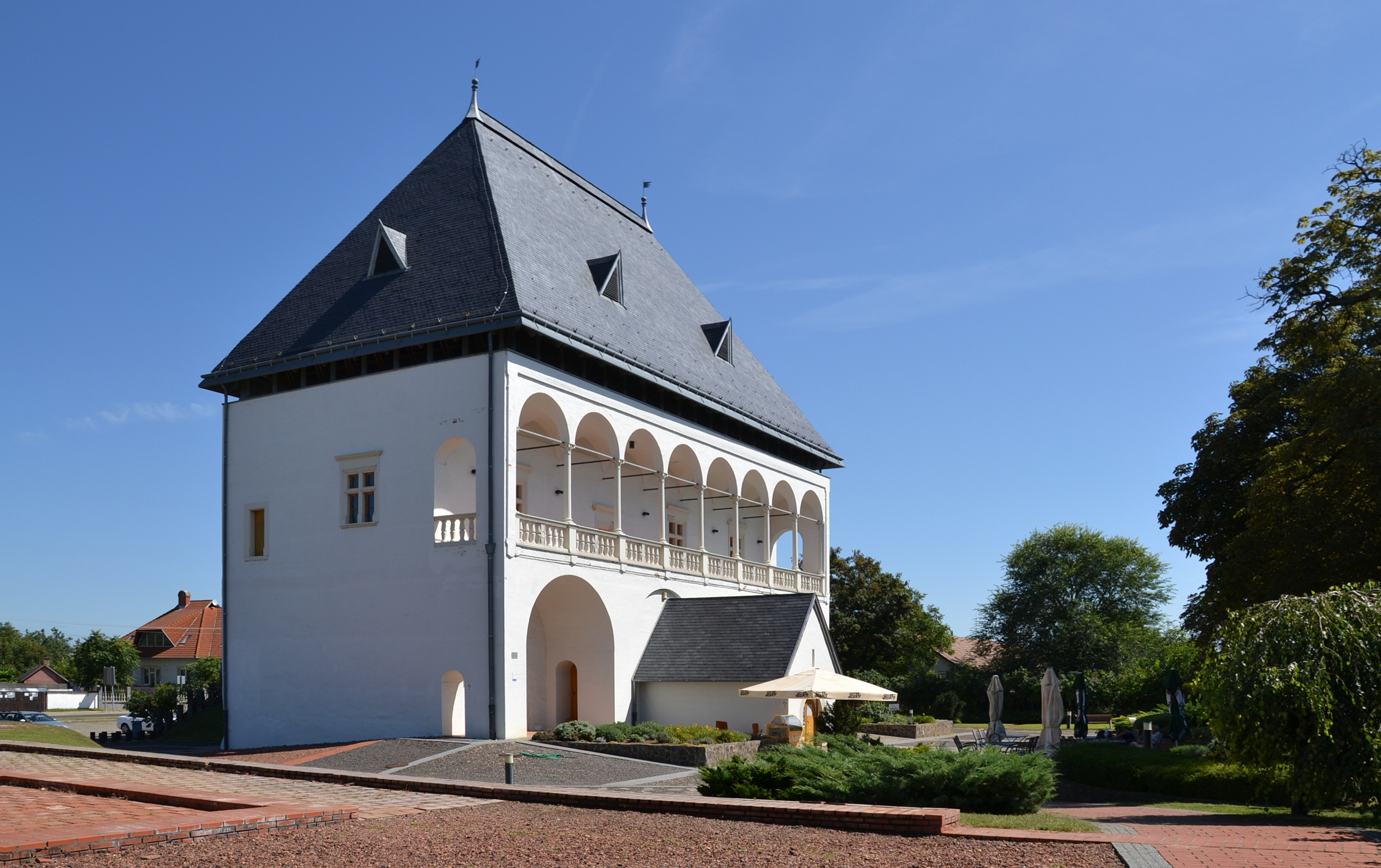
Báthory Castle

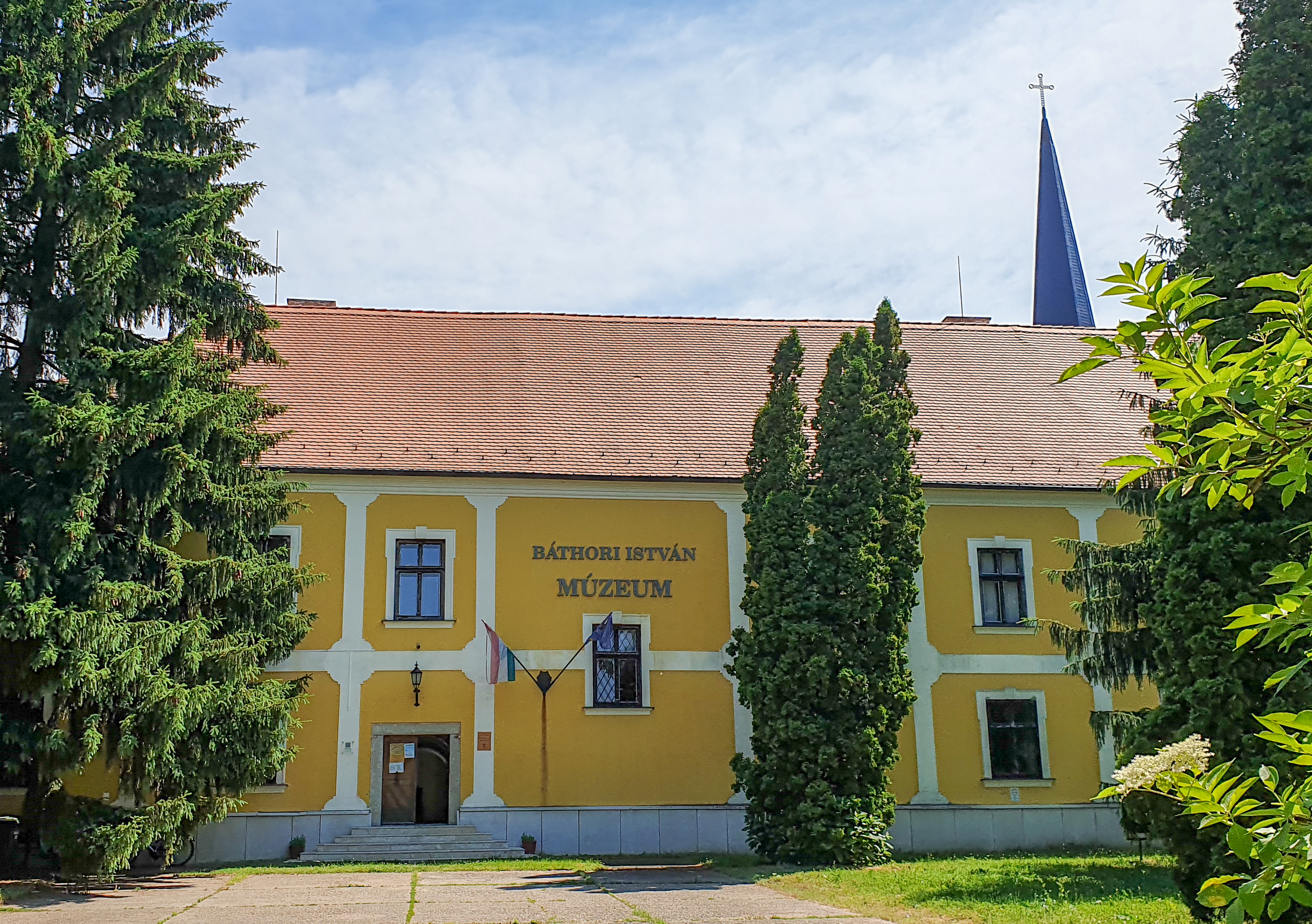
István Báthori Museum

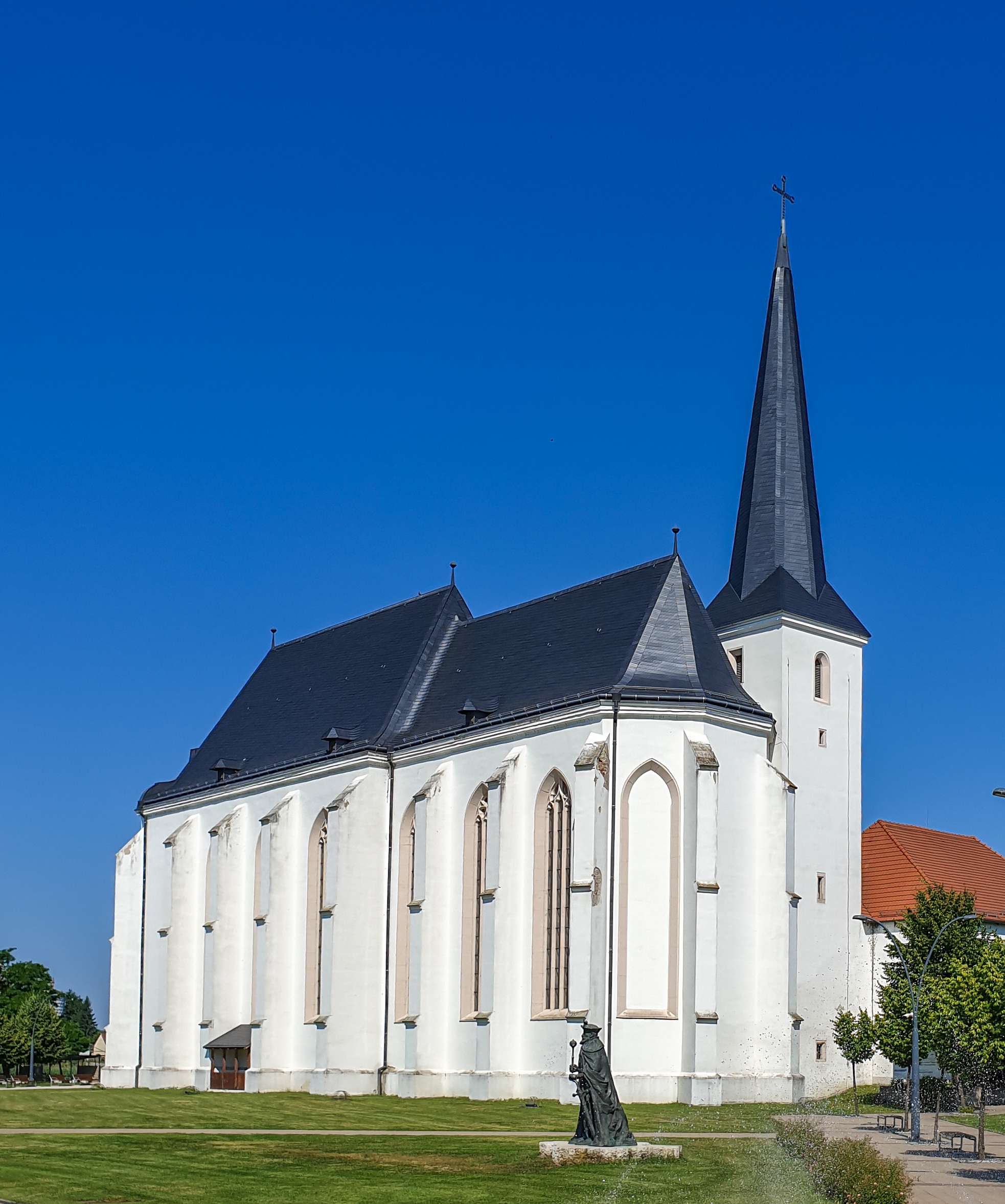
Our Lady church

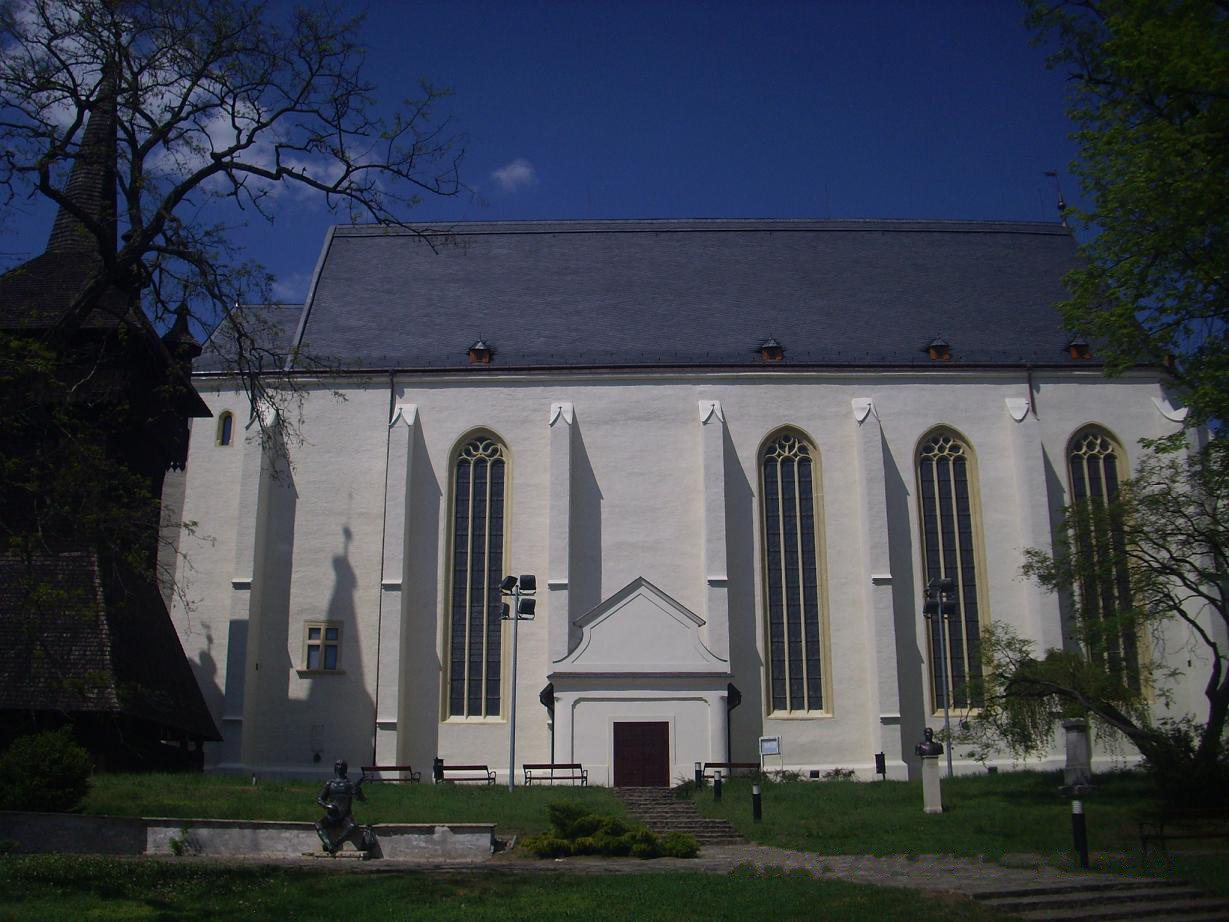
Reformed church

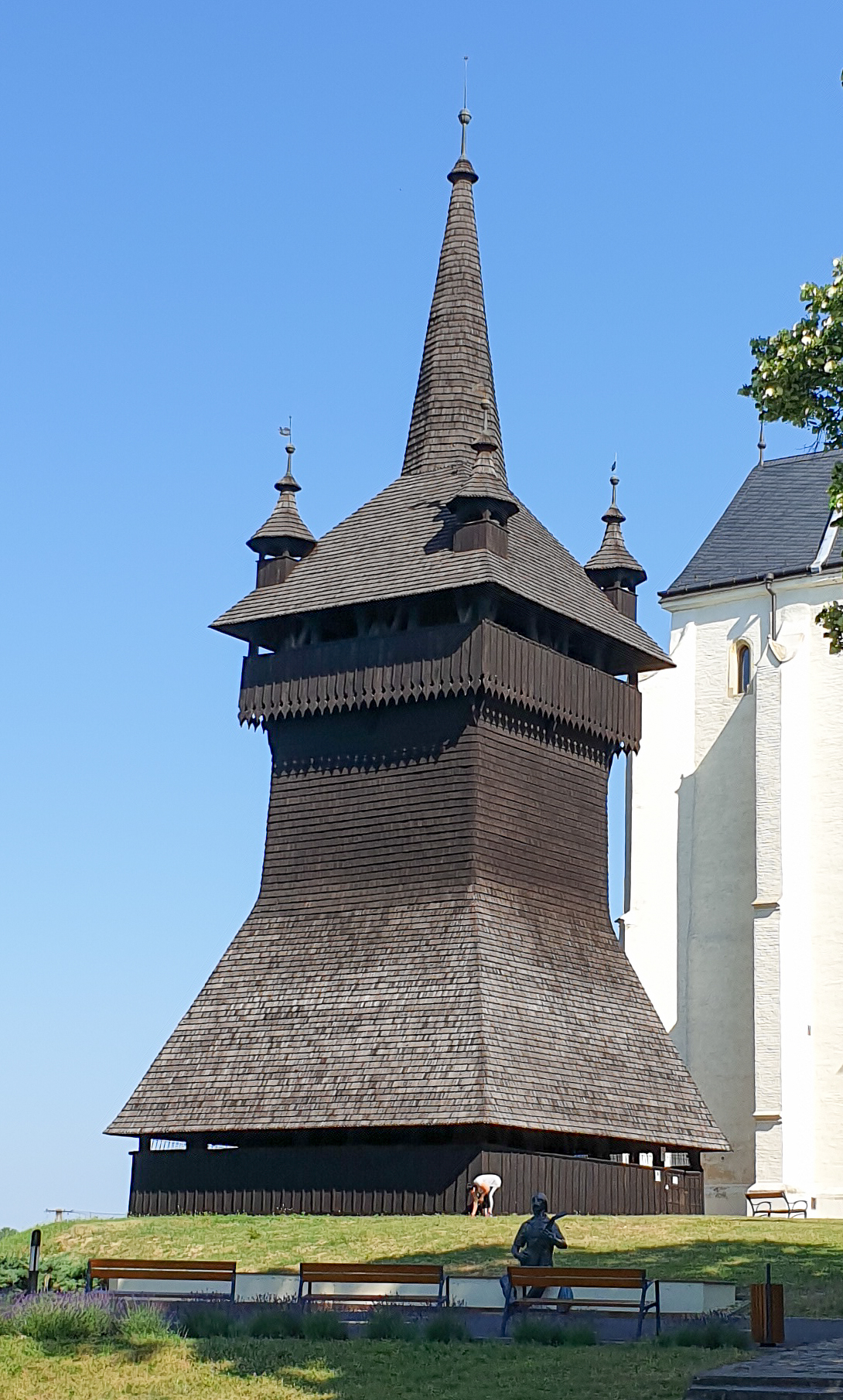
Reformed belfry

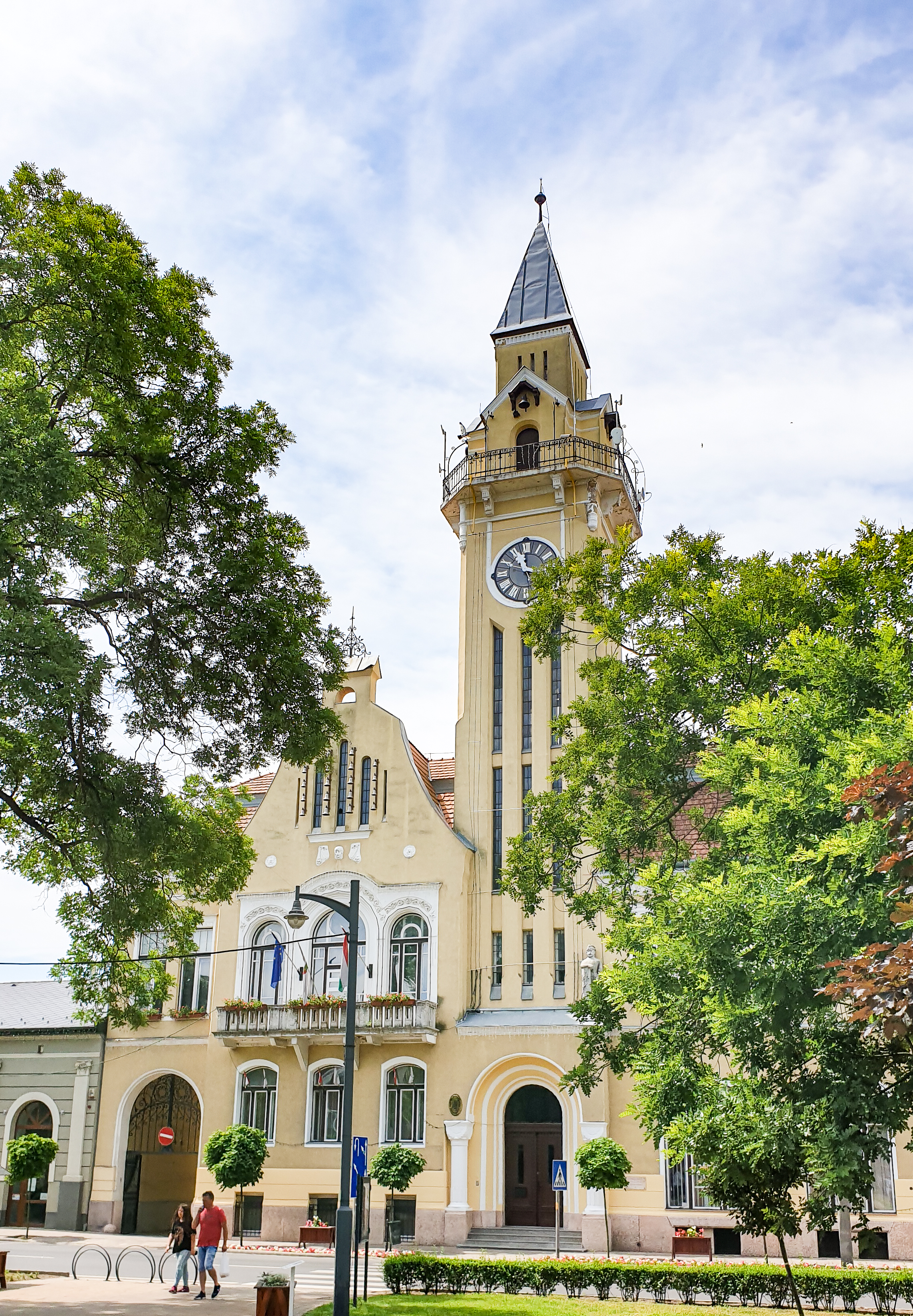
Town hall

== Notable people ==
- Elizabeth Bathory (1560–1614), Hungarian countess and prolific female serial killer
- Meshulam Gross (1863–1947), Hungarian American entrepreneur

== Twin towns – sister cities ==
Nyírbátor is twinned with:

- Carei, Romania
- Khust, Ukraine
- Rawa Mazowiecka, Poland
- Șimleu Silvaniei, Romania
- Vynohradiv, Ukraine

== See also ==
- Wooden Belfry of Nyírbátor
