= Ököritófülpös =

Coordinates: 47°55′N 22°31′E

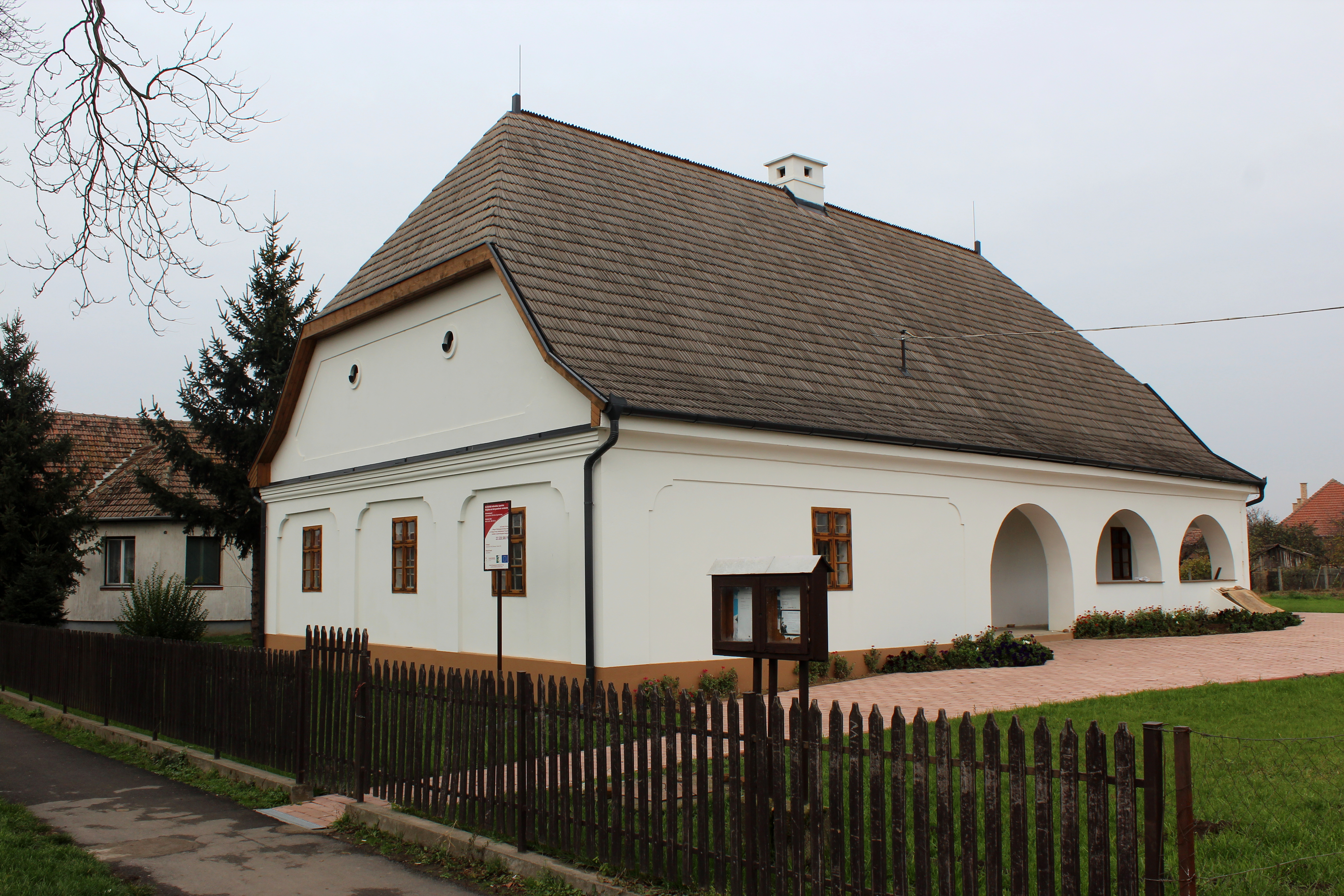
- The vicarage of the Reformed church in Ököritófülpös

- Flag Coat of arms
- Interactive map of Ököritófülpös
- Country: Hungary
- County: Szabolcs-Szatmár-Bereg

Area
  - Total: 33.43 km^{2} (12.91 sq mi)

Population (2001)
  - Total: 2,015
  - Density: 60.28/km^{2} (156.1/sq mi)
- Time zone: UTC+1 (CET)
  - Summer (DST): UTC+2 (CEST)
- Postal code: 4755
- Area code: 44

Location of Szabolcs-Szatmar-Bereg county in Hungary

Ököritófülpös is a village in Szabolcs-Szatmár-Bereg county, in the Northern Great Plain region of eastern Hungary.

== Location ==
It is located in eastern region of the county on the Szatmári plain. Today the entire settlement lies on the left bank of the Szamos, but before the regulation of the river, only the present-day Ököritó and Mácsa settlement parts fell on the left bank, Fülpös was on the other side. The former river section that divided the present-day settlement into separate parts is now a backwater, which winds from Cégénydányád almost all the way to the border of Nábrád, approximately 25 kilometers long.

== History ==
In 1910, a fire in a barn during a dancing-party known as the Fire of Szatmárököritó killed at least 312 people.

== Geography ==
It covers an area of 33.43 km^{2} (13 sq mi) and has a population of 2015 people (2001).
