= Hodász =

Coordinates: 47°55′N 22°13′E

- Large Village
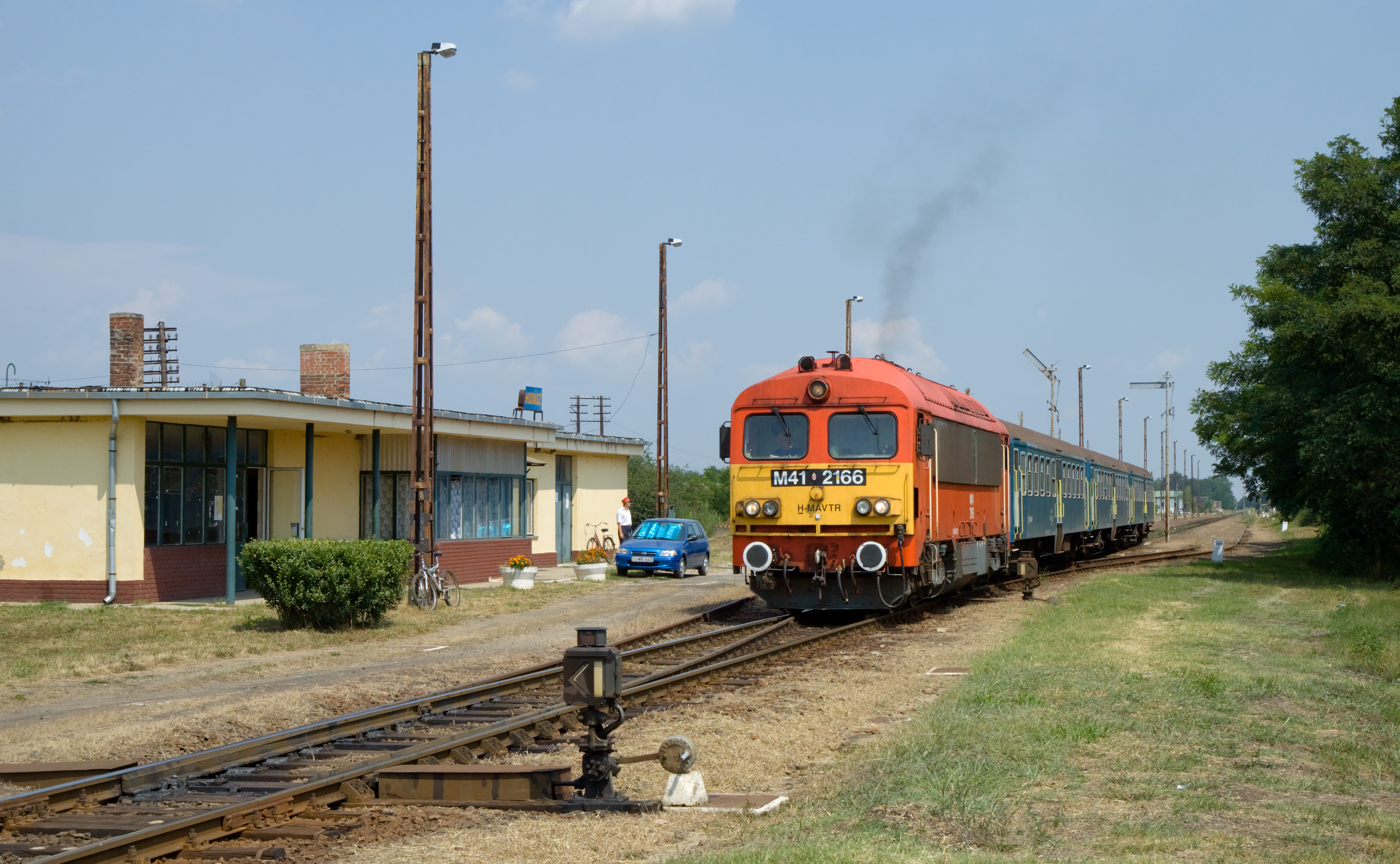
- Railway passing through Hodász

- Coat of arms
- Interactive map of Hodász
- Country: Hungary
- County: Szabolcs-Szatmár-Bereg

Area
  - Large Village: 7.88 km^{2} (3.04 sq mi)
  - Urban: 2.65 km^{2} (1.02 sq mi)
- Elevation: 147 m (482 ft)

Population (2015)
  - Large Village: 3,380
  - Density: 132/km^{2} (340/sq mi)
- Time zone: UTC+1 (CET)
  - Summer (DST): UTC+2 (CEST)
- Postal code: 4334
- Area code: 44

Hodász is a large village in Szabolcs-Szatmár-Bereg county, in the Northern Great Plain region of eastern Hungary.

== Geography ==
It covers an area of 26.49 km^{2} (10 sq mi) and has a population of 3380 people (2015).

== Demographics ==
As of 2023, the village had a total population of 3234. As of 2022, the town was 93.8% Hungarian, and 21.9% Gypsy. The population was 34.7% Greek Catholic, 25.2% Reformed, and 8% Roman Catholic.

== In popular culture ==
The train station of Hodász is the site of one scene in the documentary movie Latcho Drom, featuring a little Hungarian boy dancing along with local Roma, who are singing.
