= Győrtelek =

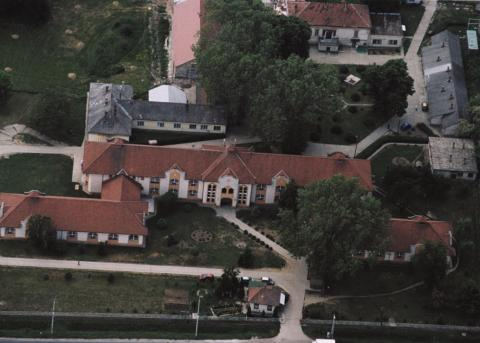
- Aerial photograph of Győrtelek

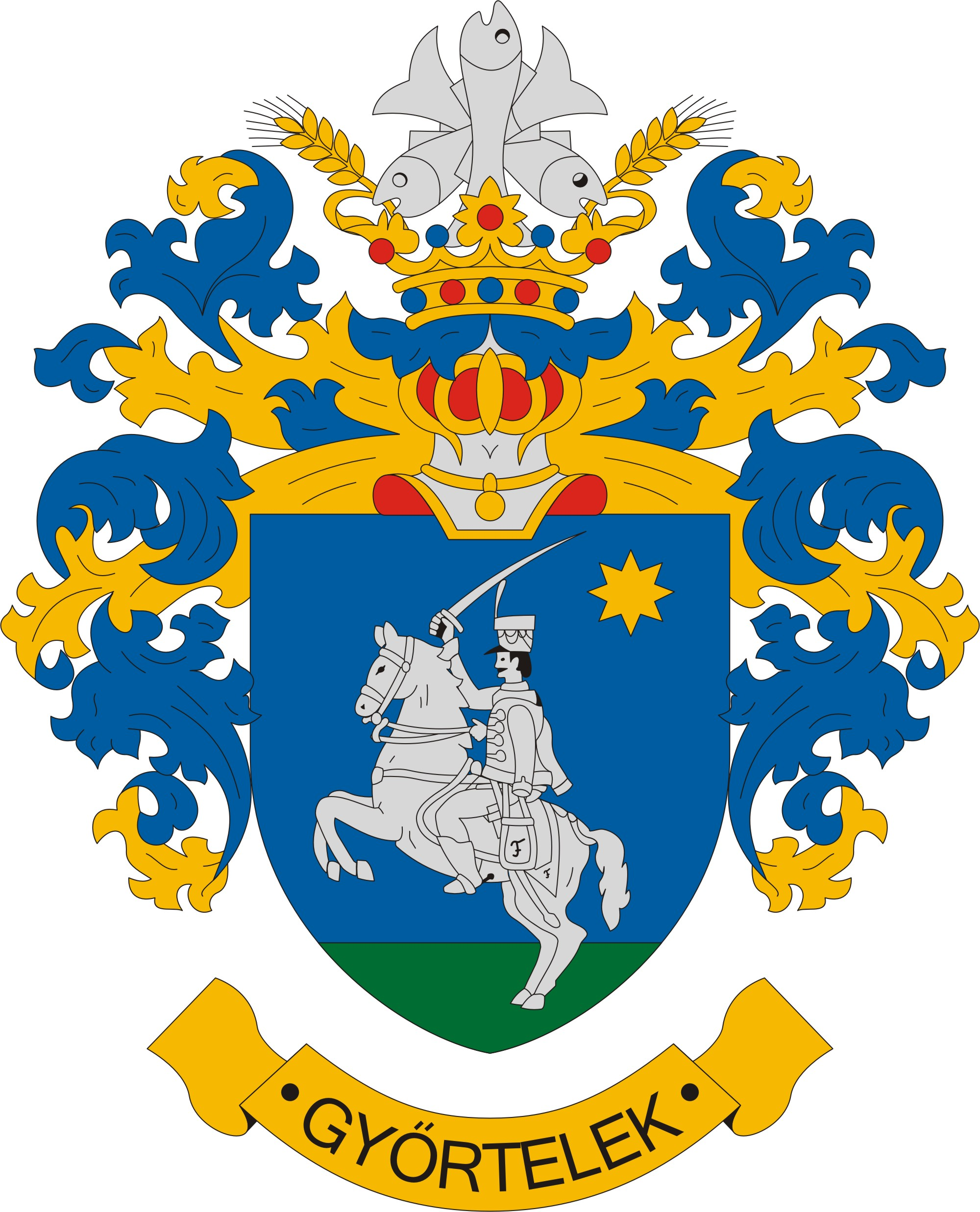
- Coat of arms

- Location of Győrtelek in Hungary
- Coordinates: 47.93°N 22.43°E
- Country: Hungary
- Region: Northern Great Plain
- County: Szabolcs-Szatmár-Bereg

Area
  - Total: 14.78 km^{2} (5.71 sq mi)

Population (2013)
  - Total: 1,615
  - Density: 109.3/km^{2} (283.0/sq mi)
- Time zone: UTC+1 (CET)
  - Summer (DST): UTC+2 (CEST)
- Postal code: 4752
- Area code: +36 44
- Website: http://gyortelek.hu/

Győrtelek is a village in Szabolcs-Szatmár-Bereg county, in the Northern Great Plain region of eastern Hungary.

== Geography ==
It covers an area of 14.78 km^{2} (6 sq mi) and has a population of 1,615 (2013 estimate).

== Population ==
Year	1980	1990	2001	2010	2011	2013
Population	1,577 (census)	1,364 (census)	1,697 (census)	1,605 (estimate)	1,573 (census)	1,615 (estimate)

== History ==
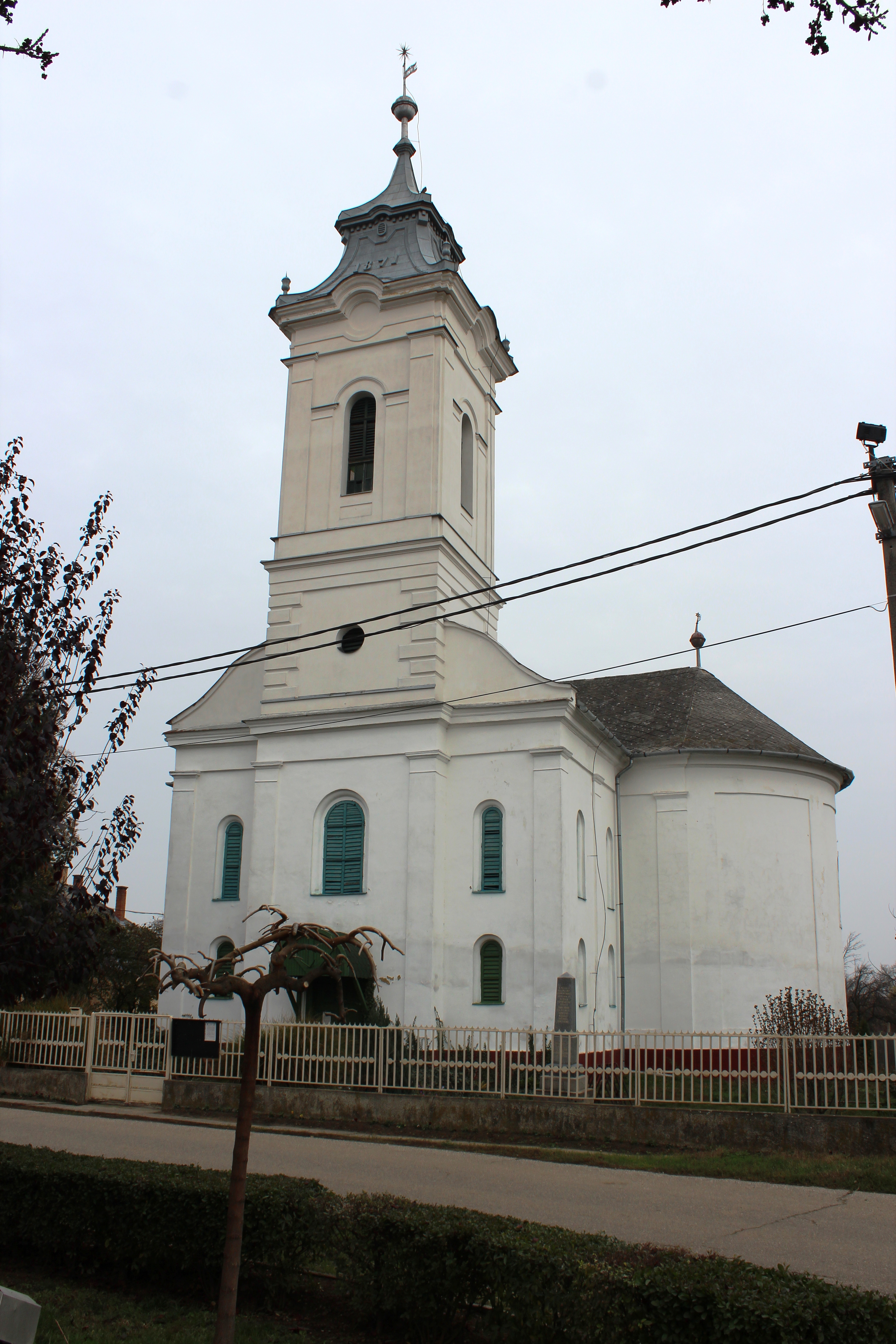
The Reformat Church

It was recorded by the name of Gyerthelek in 1477; its meaning: the property of a person called György.

The Calvinist church was built of brick in 1822.

Five Romanian nationals, including a child, died when their car (registered in Poland) crashed in Győrtelek in the early hours of June 8, 2014. In the accident, the car veered to the opposite lane of the road and crashed frontally with a bus and then with a van (registered in Harghita County). Four people in the bus and one travelling in the van suffered light injuries.
