= Géberjén =

Coordinates: 47°56′N 22°28′E

- Location of Szabolcs-Szatmar-Bereg county in Hungary.
- Country: Hungary
- County: Szabolcs-Szatmár-Bereg

Area
  - Total: 5.38 km^{2} (2.08 sq mi)

Population (2015)
  - Total: 488
  - Density: 90.7/km^{2} (235/sq mi)
- Time zone: UTC+1 (CET)
  - Summer (DST): UTC+2 (CEST)
- Postal code: 4754
- Area code: 44

Géberjén is a village in Szabolcs-Szatmár-Bereg county, in the Northern Great Plain region of eastern Hungary.

== Geography ==
It covers an area of 5.38 km^{2} (2 sq mi) and has a population of 488 people (2015).

== History ==
The first written mention of Géberjén appears in a medieval text under the name "Gabrian". Historically, the village suffered frequent floods, with the most recent occurring in 1972 and the most devastating in 1882.
