= Vállaj =

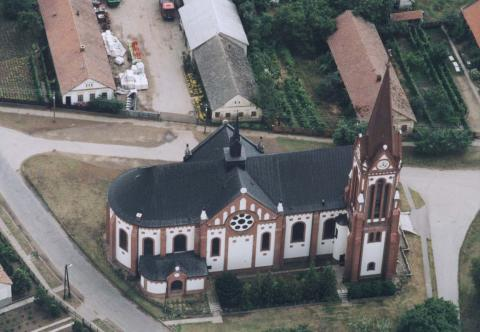
- Church from above

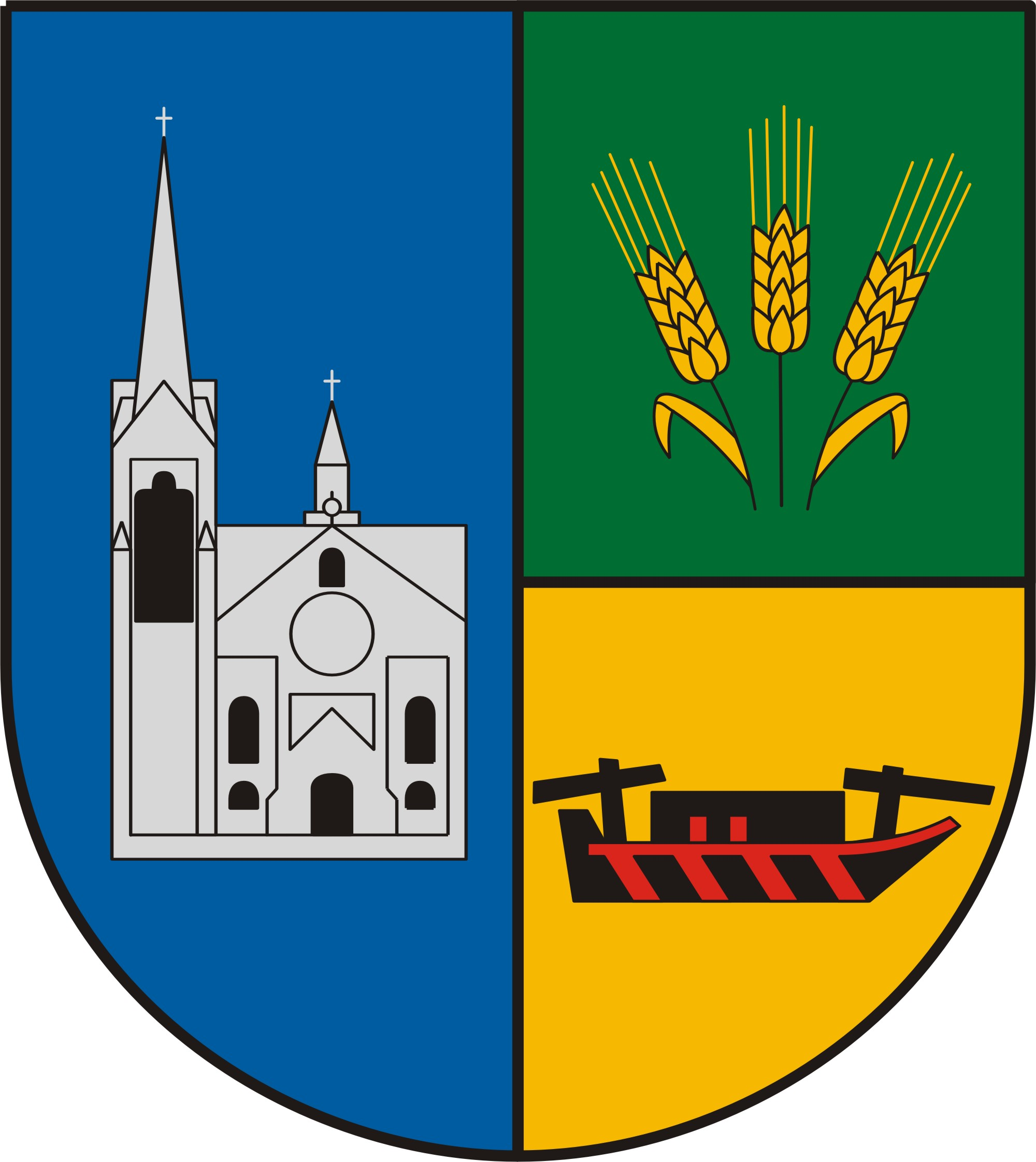
- Coat of arms

- Location of Vállaj in Hungary
- Coordinates: 47.7641624°N 22.382185°E
- Country: Hungary
- Region: Northern Great Plain
- County: Szabolcs-Szatmár-Bereg

Area
  - Total: 22.27 km^{2} (8.60 sq mi)

Population (2015)
  - Total: 1,120
  - Density: 50.3/km^{2} (130/sq mi)
- Time zone: UTC+1 (CET)
  - Summer (DST): UTC+2 (CEST)
- Postal code: 4351
- Area code: +36 44
- Website: https://vallaj.hu/

Vállaj is a village in Szabolcs-Szatmár-Bereg county, in the Northern Great Plain region of eastern Hungary. Vállaj is a settlement in the south-eastern corner of Szabolcs-Szatmár-Bereg county, by the Kraszna river, next to the Hungarian-Romanian border.

== Geography ==
It covers an area of 22.27 km^{2} (9 sq mi) and has a population of 1120 people (2015).

== History ==
Vállaj's name appears in the 13th century as the property of the members of the Kusalyi Jakcs family. As early as 1335, it was listed in the deeds of the Gutkeled family as Vale. In 1354 it belonged to the monastery of the Gutkeled clan in Sárvár.

In 1423 the Báthorians won a royal gift to him, and thus became part of the Ossetian estate, sharing his fate. From 1746 to 1945, the village belonged to the estate of Count Károlyiak.

A separate chapter in the history of Vállaj is the introduction of native German speakers. The antecedents of this are to be found in the state of the country, and the most affected county of Satu Mare at that time: Due to famine, the number of serfs in the labor force of Szatmár County decreased. In 1712, for example, Csanálos, Fény and Vállaj were uninhabited for a short time. As early as 1712, Count Sándor Károlyi, the landlord of the region, applied to the Viennese court to bring German settlers. The first group is located between the Danube and Lake Constance. arrived in Charlemagne on 14 July 1712 from the Oberschwaben. 300 families (about 1,400 people settled here and in the nearby villages. Count Sándor Károlyi established six Swabian settlements in the Nagykároly estate, these are: Nagykároly, Csanálos, Mezőfény, Nagymajtény, Kaplony and Mezőpetri.), until the end of the 19th century.

The Swabian settlement of Vállaj began in the spring of 1747 in the time of Ferenc Károlyi. However, most of the settlers came from other Hungarian villages, and only scattered from the mainland.

Ágerdő is also located on the outskirts of the village. The name of the site appears in 1430, when a forest on the border of Börvely is called. Today, the name Ágerdő refers to a vineyard and a farm settlement on the eastern border of Vállaj, close to Börvely in Romania.

Between 1950 and 1955, Vállaj was merged with Mérk, under the name of Mérkvállaj, but at the request of the Vállaj, the merger ceased.
