= Kocsord =

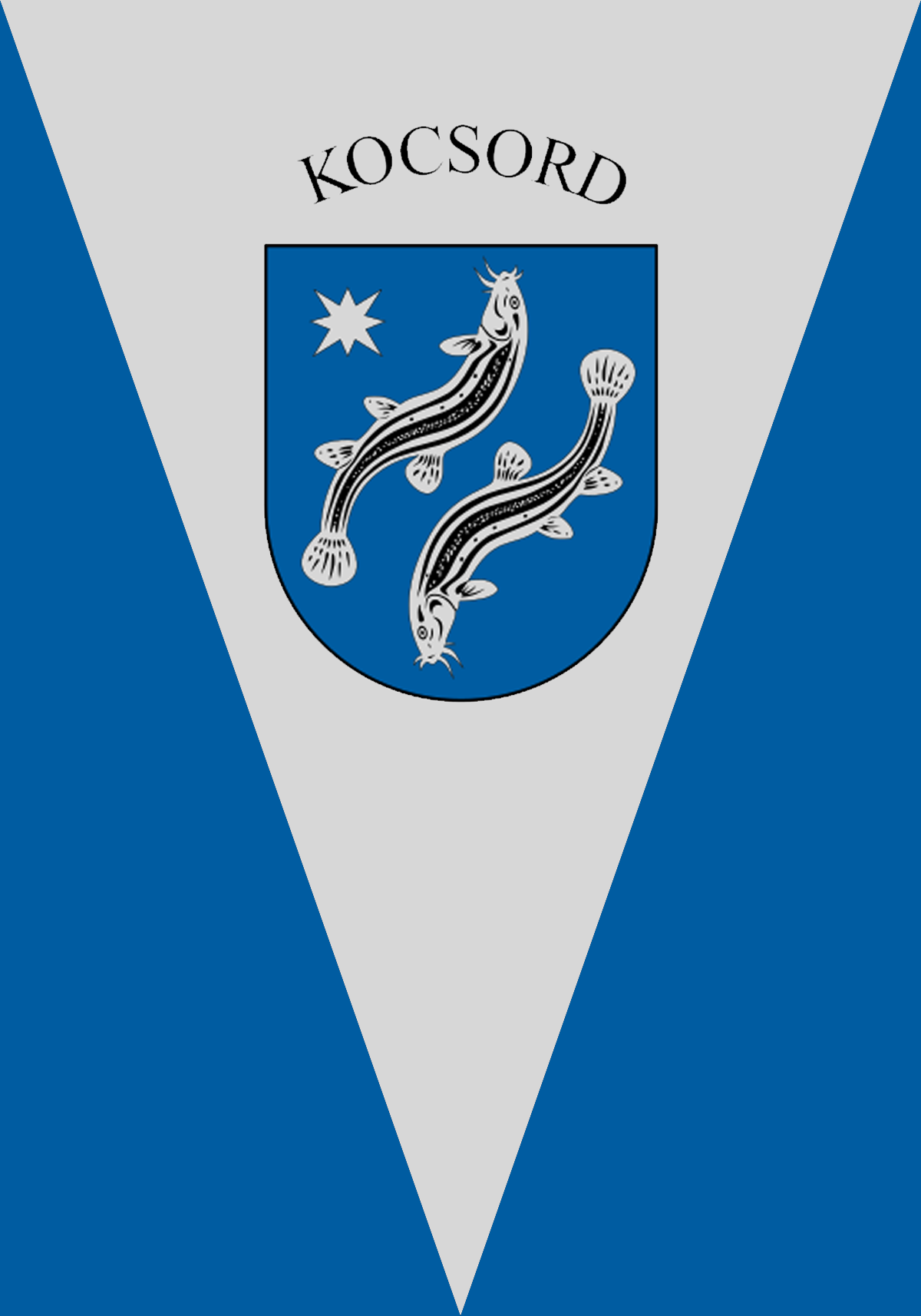
- Flag Coat of arms

- Location within Hungary
- Coordinates: 47°57′N 22°23′E
- Country: Hungary
- County: Szabolcs-Szatmár-Bereg

Area
  - Total: 25.47 km^{2} (9.83 sq mi)

Population (2015)
  - Total: 2,878
  - Density: 113.2/km^{2} (293/sq mi)
- Time zone: UTC+1 (CET)
  - Summer (DST): UTC+2 (CEST)
- Postal code: 4751
- Area code: 44

Kocsord is a village in Szabolcs-Szatmár-Bereg county, in the Northern Great Plain region of eastern Hungary.

== Geography ==
It covers an area of 25.47 km^{2} (10 sq mi) and has a population of 2878 people (2015).

== 2016 mayoral election ==
On 8 May 2016, István Földi, a Jobbik member, won the Kocsord mayoral election.
