= 2026–27 Hajdúszoboszlói SE season =

Aqua-General Hajdúszoboszlói SE
2026–27 season
- Coach: László Szabó
- Stadium: Bocskai Stadion
- Megyei Bajnokság I: 1st
- Vármegyei Kupa: Third round
- Top goalscorer: League: Tóth, 20 goals All: Tóth, 27 goals
- Biggest win: 19 goals 20–1 v Újszentmargita (H), Vármegyei Kupa, First round, 31 July 2026
- Biggest defeat: 2 goals 0–2 v Hajdúsámson (H), Vármegyei Kupa, Third round, 16 September 2026
- All statistics correct as of 14 November 2026.

The 2026–27 season is Hajdúszoboszlói SE's (abbreviated as HSE) 84rd competitive season, 4th consecutive season in the Megyei Bajnokság I and 114th year in existence as a football club. In addition to the domestic league (tier 4), Hajdúszoboszlói SE participate in this season's editions of the Vármegyei Kupa (County Cup).

Since August 2020 they are sponsored by Aqua-General, so the official name for the team is Aqua-General Hajdúszoboszlói Sportegyesület.

Vármegyei Kupa

In the first round of Vármegyei Kupa (County Cup) they won 20–1 at home against Újszentmargita (who finished fourth place in Megyei Bajnokság III last season) and advanced to the next round. In the second round of Vármegyei Kupa (County Cup) the opponent will be Zsáka, who will start in Megyei Bajnokság III this season and in the first round they beat Komádi 6–1. In the third round, they lost 0–2 at home to Hajdúsámson, consequently, their cup campaign for the season came to an end, and they will also be unable to participate in the Hungarian Cup next year.

== Kits ==
Home	Away

== First team squad ==
Source: Sofascore

As of 27 July 2026

No.	Player	Nat.	Pos.	Date of birth (age)	Since	Signed from
Goalkeepers
1	Zoltán Bánhegyi	Hungary	GK	6 February 1992 (age 34)	2023	Kaba
25	Károly Kiss	Hungary	GK	24 February 1996 (age 30)	2026	Nagyhegyes
25	Dávid Domonkos	Hungary	GK	19 July 2004 (age 22)	2022	Diósgyőr II
89	Ákos Péter Sávolt	Hungary	GK	25 October 2007 (age 19)	2025	DEAC
89	Levente Király	Hungary	GK	21 January 2009 (age 17)	2015	Academy of HSE
89	Norbert Bákonyi	Hungary	GK	29 January 1988 (age 38)	2026	Monostorpályi
Defenders
5	Máté Ménes	Hungary	DF	17 April 1998 (age 28)	2026	Monostorpályi
7	Márk Máté Potor	Hungary	DF	5 January 2007 (age 19)	2020	Balmazújváros
13	Roberto Gomes Schneider	Hungary	DF	13 September 2004 (age 22)	2023	DLA
13	Balázs Mezei	Hungary	DF	13 April 2000 (age 26)	2025	Újfehértó
17	Dominik Rácsai	Hungary	DF	5 August 2007 (age 19)	2024	Légy Erős
23	Zoltán Éles	Hungary	DF	24 July 1993 (age 33)	2023	Karcag
33	Márk Bogár	Hungary	DF	24 September 1994 (age 32)	2024	Hajdúböszörmény
55	Aurél Vaskó	Hungary	DF	22 March 2005 (age 21)	2026	Sényő
77	János Pallagi	Hungary	DF	29 August 1998 (age 28)	2023	Kaba
Midfielders
4	Benedek Kovács	Hungary	MF	8 May 2008 (age 18)	2021	DLA
6	Csaba Kónya	Hungary	MF	19 April 1994 (age 32)	2024	Karcag
8	Levente Csaba Butor	Hungary	MF	1 September 2006 (age 20)	2025	Tiszaújváros
10	Csaba Sallai	Hungary	MF	30 June 2001 (age 25)	2025	Balmazújváros
14	Patrik Békési	Hungary	MF	3 August 2007 (age 19)	2015	Academy of HSE
14	Albert Pajzos	Hungary	MF	17 August 2007 (age 19)	2024	Ebes
16	Zsolt Szathmári (captain)	Hungary	MF	13 November 1989 (age 37)	2020	Hajdúböszörmény
19	Miklós Csordás-Gurbán	Hungary	MF	13 January 2007 (age 19)	2026	Felsőzsolca
20	Tamás Sinyi	Hungary	MF	26 June 2006 (age 20)	2025	DEAC
Forwards
9	Lajos András Tóth	Hungary	FW	8 March 1992 (age 34)	2023	Hajdúböszörmény
11	Attila Bordán	Hungary	FW	19 March 2006 (age 20)	2020	Balmazújváros
13	Bence Dobi	Hungary	FW	27 October 2005 (age 21)	2026	Püspökladány
14	Martin Drobina	Hungary	FW	24 September 2004 (age 22)	2026	Balmazújváros
19	Patrik Fábián	Hungary	FW	5 September 2007 (age 19)	2015	Academy of HSE
22	Martin Alex Kovács	Hungary	FW	6 February 1995 (age 31)	2025	Kaba
39	Balázs Bence Karika	Hungary	FW	3 December 2001 (age 24)	2022	Diósgyőr II

== Transfers ==
=== Summer ===
In
Date	No.	Pos.	Nat.	Player	Moving from	Division	Ref.
15 June 2026	13	FW	Hungary	Bence Dobi	Püspökladány	Megyei Bajnokság I	
17 June 2026	1	GK	Hungary	Norbert Bákonyi	Monostorpályi	Megyei Bajnokság I	
18 June 2026	5	MF	Hungary	Máté Ménes	Monostorpályi	Megyei Bajnokság I	
29 June 2026	14	DF	Hungary	Aurél Vaskó	Sényő	Nemzeti Bajnokság III	
13 July 2026	19	MF	Hungary	Miklós Csordás-Gurbán	Felsőzsolca	Megyei Bajnokság I	
27 July 2026	23	FW	Hungary	Martin Drobina	Balmazújváros	Megyei Bajnokság I	
27 July 2026	25	GK	Hungary	Károly Kiss	Nagyhegyes	Megyei Bajnokság II	

Out
Date	No.	Pos.	Nat.	Player	Moving to	Division	Ref.
29 June 2026	91	FW	Hungary	Bogát Bárány	Monostorpályi	Megyei Bajnokság I	

== Friendlies ==
Win Draw Loss Fixtures

=== Pre-season ===
Hajdúszoboszlói SE started the preparation for the 2026/27 season at 30 June, 2026.

4 July 2026 Friendly	DEAC (NB III)	3–0	Hajdúszoboszló	Debrecen
10:00	Fekete; Lénárt	Report		Stadium: DEAC Stadion

11 July 2026 Friendly	Hajdúszoboszló	8–0	Püspökladány (MB I–tier 4)	Hajdúszoboszló
10:00		Report		Stadium: Bocskai Stadion

16 July 2026 Friendly	Hajdúszoboszló	8–3	Nagyhegyes (MB II–tier 5)	Hajdúszoboszló
18:30		Report		Stadium: Bocskai Stadion

18 July 2026 Friendly	Hajdúszoboszló	1–1	Tarpa (NB III)	Hajdúszoboszló
10:30	Drobina	Report	Goal	Stadium: Bocskai Stadion

29 July 2026 Friendly	Hajdúszoboszló	1–1	Kemecse (Nyíregyháza) (MB I)	Hajdúszoboszló
18:00	Gomes Schneider	Report	Goal	Stadium: Bocskai Stadion

=== Mid-season ===
22 August 2026 Friendly	Hajdúszoboszló	12–2	Nagyhegyes (MB II–tier 5)	Hajdúszoboszló
10:00	Tóth; Drobina; Sallai; Butor; Potor; Kónya	Report		Stadium: Bocskai Stadion

== Competitions ==
=== Overall record ===
In italics, we indicate the Last match and the Final position achieved in competition(s) that have not yet been completed.

Competition	First match	Last match	Starting round	Final position	Record							
Competition	First match	Last match	Starting round	Final position	Pld	W	D	L	GF	GA	GD	Win %
Megyei Bajnokság I	15 August 2026	14 November 2026	Matchday 1	1st	13	12	0	1	58	9	+49	92.31
Magyar Kupa	Did not qualify	—	—	—	0	0	0	0	0	0	+0	—
Vármegyei Kupa	31 July 2026	16 September 2026	First round	Third round	3	2	0	1	28	3	+25	66.67
Total					16	14	0	2	86	12	+74	87.50

Last updated: 14 November 2026
Source: Sofascore

=== Megyei Bajnokság I ===
Competition Announcement for 2026/27 season.

==== League table ====
Pos	Team	Pld	W	D	L	GF	GA	GD	Pts	Promotion or relegation
1	Aqua-General HSE (Hajdúszoboszló)	13	12	0	1	58	9	+49	36	Qualification for promotion play-offs
2	Monostorpályi	12	11	0	1	48	8	+40	33	
3	Hajdúsámson	13	8	3	2	39	22	+17	27	
4	Téglás	13	7	4	2	30	16	+14	25	
5	Balmazújváros	13	7	3	3	32	20	+12	24	
6	DEAC II	13	6	3	4	28	19	+9	21	
7	Sárréti DSK (Sárrétudvari)	13	6	2	5	23	24	−1	20	
8	Józsa	13	6	2	5	17	21	−4	20	
9	Hajdúböszörmény	13	5	4	4	19	33	−14	19	
10	Bestrong (Debrecen)	13	5	1	7	27	32	−5	16	
11	BUSE (Berettyóújfalu)	13	4	2	7	23	27	−4	14	
12	Püspökladány	13	2	4	7	14	25	−11	10	
13	Ebes	13	2	2	9	22	34	−12	8	
14	Hajdúdorog	13	2	1	10	19	42	−23	7	
15	Bocskai (Vámospércs)	13	1	3	9	11	44	−33	6	Relegation to Megyei Bajnokság II
16	Létavértes (Note: 1 penalty point deducted from Létavértes)	12	1	2	9	16	50	−34	4	Relegation to Megyei Bajnokság II

Updated to match(es) played on 14 November 2026. Source: Hungarian Football Federation

==== Results summary ====
Overall								Home						Away					
Pld	W	D	L	GF	GA	GD	Pts	W	D	L	GF	GA	GD	W	D	L	GF	GA	GD
13	12	0	1	58	9	+49	36	8	0	0	38	5	+33	4	0	1	20	4	+16

Last updated: 14 November 2026.
Source: Sofascore

==== Results by round ====
A = Away; H = Home; W = Win; D = Draw; L = Loss; P = Postponed

Round	1	2	3	4	5	6	7	8	9	10	11	12	13	14	15	16	17	18	19	20	21	22	23	24	25	26	27	28	29	30
Ground	H	H	H	A	H	A	H	A	H	A	H	A	H	A	H	A	A	A	H	A	H	A	H	A	H	A	H	A	H	A
Result	W	W	W	L	W	W	W	W	W	W	W	W	W																	
Position	3	1	1	3	3	1	1	1	1	1	1	1	1																	
Points	3	6	9	9	12	15	18	21	24	27	30	33	36																	

Updated to match(es) played on 14 November 2026. Source:

==== Results overview ====
All results are indicated from the perspective of Hajdúszoboszlói SE.
We indicate in parentheses the number of round.
Win Draw Loss Postponed

Opposition	Home score	Away score	Aggregate score	Double
Balmazújváros	8–0 (13)	– (28)	8–0	
Bestrong (Debrecen)	5–1 (5)	– (20)	5–1	
Bocskai (Vámospércs)	6–1 (2)	– (17)	6–1	
BUSE (Berettyóújfalu)	– (25)	4–0 (10)	4–0	
DEAC II	4–1 (7)	– (22)	4–1	
Ebes	– (23)	3–1 (8)	3–1	
Hajdúböszörmény	– (21)	8–0 (6)	8–0	
Hajdúdorog	– (27)	5–2 (12)	5–2	
Hajdúsámson	– (15)	– (30)		
Józsa	3–0 (1)	– (16)	3–0	
Létavértes	– (29)	– (14)		
Monostorpályi	1–0 (3)	– (18)	1–0	
Püspökladány	6–1 (11)	– (26)	6–1	
Sárréti DSK (Sárrétudvari)	5–1 (9)	– (24)	5–1	
Téglás	– (19)	0–1 (4)	0–1	No

==== Matches ====
Win Draw Loss Fixtures

15 August 2026 1	HSE	3–0	Józsa	Hajdúszoboszló
17:00 CEST	Ménes 15'; Mezei 24'; Dobi 45'	Report	Adonyi (yellow card) 7'; Szabó (yellow card) 25'; Gál (yellow card) 30'; Iványi (yellow card) 45'	Stadium: Bocskai Stadion; Referee: Zoltán Gajdics; Assistant referees: Krisztián Szigeti dr, László Boa
Note: • Hajdúszoboszló: Bákonyi (Domonkos (substituted on) 74') — Ménes, Kónya, Butor (Csordás-Gurbán (substituted on) 67'), L. Tóth, Dobi (Potor (substituted on) 46'), Drobina, Szathmári (Karika (substituted on) 46'), Mezei (Z. Éles (substituted on) 46'), Vaskó (Pallagi (substituted on) 67'), Gomes (Bordán (substituted on) 67') • Coach: László Szabó

29 August 2026 2	HSE	6–1	Bocskai (Vámospércs)	Hajdúszoboszló
17:00 CEST	Pallagi 1'; Kónya 28'; Drobina 37'; L. Tóth 57' (pen.), 88'; Bordán 81'	Report	K. Kolompár 10' (yellow card) 28'; J. Kolompár (yellow card) 23'; N. Kolompár (yellow card) 40'; Nagy (yellow card) 48'; Vincze (yellow card) 65'; Sarkadi (yellow card) 72'	Stadium: Bocskai Stadion; Referee: Benedek Tibor Tóth; Assistant referees: Dávid Szentesi, Zalán Török
Note: • Hajdúszoboszló: Bákonyi (Kiss (substituted on) 84') — Kónya, Butor (Dobi (substituted on) 46'), L. Tóth, Gomes, Szathmári, Drobina (Bordán (substituted on) 67'), Vaskó (Csordás-Gurbán (substituted on) 57'), Ménes (Potor (substituted on) 57'), Mezei (Karika (substituted on) 46'), (Pallagi (Sallai (substituted on) 67') • Coach: László Szabó

5 September 2026 3	HSE	1–0	Monostorpályi	Hajdúszoboszló
15:30 CEST	Drobina (yellow card) 30'; Sallai (yellow card) 37'; Pallagi (yellow card) 41'; Bákonyi (red card) 43'; L. Tóth 48' (pen.)	Report	B. Bárány (yellow card) 39'; Gyügyei (yellow card) 41'; Szilágyi (yellow card) 62'; Ujvárosi (yellow card) 68'; Barta (yellow card) 86'	Stadium: Bocskai Stadion; Referee: Tamás Nazsa; Assistant referees: Zsombor Rizán, Máté Kalocsai
Note: • Hajdúszoboszló: Bákonyi (Domonkos (substituted on) 45') — Kónya, L. Tóth (Csordás-Gurbán (substituted on) 78'), Sinyi (Drobina (substituted on) 28'), Szathmári, Gomes, Vaskó, Mezei (Sallai (substituted on) 28'), Karika (Bordán (substituted on) 78'), Dobi, Pallagi • Coach: László Szabó

12 September 2026 4	Téglás	1–0	HSE	Téglás
15:30 CEST	I. Szabó (yellow card) 26'; Z. Nagy 54'	Report	Pallagi (yellow card) 43'	Stadium: Sportpálya; Referee: Norbert Nagy; Assistant referees: Armand Kaprinyák, Norman Sebők
Note: • Hajdúszoboszló: Domonkos — Ménes, Kónya, Butor (Dobi (substituted on) 46'), L. Tóth, {Gomes (Mezei (substituted on) 60'), Z. Éles, Vaskó (Csordás-Gurbán (substituted on) 82'), Karika (Potor (substituted on) 46'), Pallagi (Bordán (substituted on) 60'), Drobina (Sinyi (substituted on) 82') • Coach: László Szabó

19 September 2026 5	HSE	5–1	Bestrong	Hajdúszoboszló
15:00 CEST	L. Tóth 14', 42'; Barabás 29' (o.g.); Sallai 70'; Dobi 74'	Report	Kalmár 68'; Szilágyi (yellow card) 87'	Stadium: Bocskai Stadion; Referee: Sándor Gulyás; Assistant referees: Zoltán Gajdics, Ákos Nagy
Note: • Hajdúszoboszló: Bákonyi (Domonkos (substituted on) 68') — Kónya, Butor (Karika (substituted on) 46' (substituted off) 68' (Sinyi (substituted on) 68')), L. Tóth, Sallai, Ménes (Dobi (substituted on) 68'), Szathmári, Drobina (Bordán (substituted on) 68'), Vaskó, Mezei (Potor (substituted on) 46'), Pallagi (Gomes (substituted on) 46') • Coach: László Szabó

26 September 2026 6	Hajdúböszörmény	0–8	HSE	Hajdúböszörmény
15:00 CEST	Rákos (yellow card) 25'	Report	Drobina 23', 26', 35', 66', 68'; L. Tóth 31', 48'; Butor 40'; Dobi (yellow card) 87'	Stadium: Városi Sport- és Rendezvényközpont; Referee: Levente Tóth; Assistant referees: Balázs Hegedűs, Máté Czipa
Note: • Hajdúszoboszló: Bákonyi (Domonkos (substituted on) 62') — Ménes (Csordás-Gurbán (substituted on) 62'), Kónya (Potor (substituted on) 62'), Butor (Dobi (substituted on) 70'), L. Tóth, Sallai (Bordán (substituted on) 70'), Vaskó, Szathmári (Karika (substituted on) 80'), Drobina, Mezei, Gomes (Sinyi (substituted on) 62') • Coach: László Szabó

3 October 2026 7	HSE	4–1	DEAC II	Hajdúszoboszló
14:00 CEST	Sallai 4'; Ménes 6'; Drobina 59'; Potor 70'	Report	D. Oláh (yellow card) 41'; Kecskés (yellow card) 61'; M. Oláh 83' (yellow card) 87'; A. Nagy (yellow card) 85'	Stadium: Bocskai Stadion; Referee: Bence Kőhegyi; Assistant referees: László Molnár, Kornél Szász
Note: • Hajdúszoboszló: Bákonyi (Domonkos (substituted on) 75') — Ménes (Karika (substituted on) 75'), Butor (Dobi (substituted on) 62'), L. Tóth (Sinyi (substituted on) 62'), Sallai, Vaskó, Szathmári (Csordás-Gurbán (substituted on) 75'), Drobina (Bordán (substituted on) 65'), Mezei, Gomes, Pallagi (Potor (substituted on) 46') • Coach: László Szabó

10 October 2026 8	Ebes	1–3	HSE	Ebes
14:00 CEST	Szűcs 76'; Halász (yellow card) 89'	Report	L. Tóth 29'; Drobina (yellow card) 49'; Balla 62' (o.g.); Kónya (yellow card) 86' (goal) 90+2' (pen.)	Stadium: Sporttelep; Referee: Krisztián Forgács; Assistant referees: Roland Kovács, Ádám Biró
Note: • Hajdúszoboszló: Bákonyi — Ménes, Kónya, Butor (Potor (substituted on) 55'), L. Tóth (Bordán (substituted on) 86'), Sallai (Sinyi (substituted on) 70'), Vaskó (Dobi (substituted on) 70'), Szathmári, Drobina (Pallagi (substituted on) 86'), Mezei (Karika (substituted on) 55'), Gomes • Coach: László Szabó

17 October 2026 9	HSE	5–1	Sárréti DSK (Sárrétudvari)	Hajdúszoboszló
13:30 CEST	Butor (yellow card) 40'; Karika 47'; L. Tóth 49', 58', 88'; Ménes 78'	Report	N. Kiss (yellow card) 32'; Németh (yellow card) 35'; B. Kiss (yellow card) 64'; Á. Horváth (yellow card) 73'	Stadium: Bocskai Stadion; Referee: Zsombor Rizán; Assistant referees: Péter Szabó dr., Balázs Gál
Note: • Hajdúszoboszló: Bákonyi — Kónya, Butor (Dobi (substituted on) 46'), L. Tóth, Sallai (Potor (substituted on) 83'), Gomes, Vaskó (Sinyi (substituted on) 83'), Szathmári (Csordás-Gurbán (substituted on) 81'), Ménes, Drobina (Pallagi (substituted on) 81'), Mezei (Karika (substituted on) 46') • Coach: László Szabó

24 October 2026 10	BUSE (Berettyóújfalu)	0–4	HSE	Berettyóújfalu
13:30 CEST	D. Nagy (yellow card) 55'	Report	Sallai 15', 32', 37'; Drobina (yellow card) 30'; Bordán 74'; Pallagi (yellow card) 86'	Stadium: Sportpálya; Referee: Krisztián Forgács; Assistant referees: Zoltán Kovács, Balázs Farkas
Note: • Hajdúszoboszló: Bákonyi — Ménes (Pallagi (substituted on) 83'), Kónya, L. Tóth, Sallai (Bordán (substituted on) 73'), Vaskó (Potor (substituted on) 83'), Szathmári, Drobina, Mezei (Butor (substituted on) 73'), Karika (Dobi (substituted on) 73'), Gomes (Z. Éles (substituted on) 40') • Coach: László Szabó

31 October 2026 11	HSE	6–1	Püspökladány	Hajdúszoboszló
13:30 CET	L. Tóth 10', 15'; Szathmári (yellow card) 22'; Vaskó 30'; Sallai 33'; Dobi 64'; Karika 83'	Report	Fegyverneki 49'	Stadium: Bocskai Stadion; Referee: János László; Assistant referees: László Szűcs, Ákos Tóth
Note: • Hajdúszoboszló: Bákonyi (Domonkos (substituted on) 46') — Ménes, Kónya, L. Tóth, Sallai (Pallagi (substituted on) 70'), Gomes (Z. Éles (substituted on) 46'), Szathmári (Dobi (substituted on) 46'), Drobina, Vaskó (Bordán (substituted on) 70'), Mezei (Butor (substituted on) 46'), Karika • Coach: László Szabó

7 November 2026 12	Hajdúdorog	2–5	HSE	Hajdúdorog
13:30 CET	Kompár 6', 15' (yellow card) 67'; Szilágyi (yellow card) 33'; K. Tóth (yellow card) 56'; Qurikó (yellow card) 65'; Rácz (yellow card) 85'	Report	L. Tóth 21', 29', 83', 90' (pen.); Karika (yellow card) 34'; Butor 60'	Stadium: Sportpálya; Referee: Krisztián Forgács; Assistant referees: Mihály Tóth, Máté Menyhárt
Note: • Hajdúszoboszló: Bákonyi — Ménes, Kónya, L. Tóth, Sallai (Bordán (substituted on) 85'), Vaskó (Pallagi (substituted on) 46'), Drobina (Csordás-Gurbán (substituted on) 85'), Szathmári (Potor (substituted on) 70'), Z. Éles (Sinyi (substituted on) 70'), Mezei (Butor (substituted on) 46'), Karika (Dobi (substituted on) 46') • Coach: László Szabó

14 November 2026 13	HSE	8–0	Balmazújváros	Hajdúszoboszló
13:30 CET	Linzenbold 15' (o.g.); Kónya 27'; Pallagi (yellow card) 45'; B. Kovács 50' (o.g.); Sallai 52'; L. Tóth 63', 77', 90'; Dobi 85'	Report	Szegedi (yellow card) 46'	Stadium: Bocskai Stadion; Referee: Sándor Gulyás; Assistant referees: Zoltán Gajdics, Máté Menyhárt
Note: • Hajdúszoboszló: Bákonyi (Domonkos (substituted on) 73') — Ménes, Kónya (Mezei (substituted on) 65'), L. Tóth, Sallai (Bordán (substituted on) 73'), Vaskó (Butor (substituted on) 73'), Szathmári, Drobina, Karika (Dobi (substituted on) 65'), Gomes (Z. Éles (substituted on) 65'), Pallagi (Potor (substituted on) 65') • Coach: László Szabó

22 November 2026 14	Létavértes	v	HSE	Létavértes
13:00 CET		Report		Stadium: Létavértesi Sportcentrum; Referee: Armand Kaprinyák; Assistant referees: István Takács, Máté Kalocsai

28 November 2026 15	HSE	v	Hajdúsámson	Hajdúszoboszló
13:00 CET				Stadium: Bocskai Stadion

20 February 2027 16	Józsa	v	HSE	Józsa
13:00 CET				Stadium: Sportpálya

27 February 2027 17	Bocskai (Vámospércs)	v	HSE	Vámospércs
14:00 CET				Stadium: Sportpálya

6 March 2027 18	Monostorpályi	v	HSE	Monostorpályi
14:30 CET				Stadium: Vágó András Sporttelep

13 March 2027 19	HSE	v	Téglás	Hajdúszoboszló
14:30 CET				Stadium: Bocskai Stadion

20 March 2027 20	Bestrong	v	HSE	Debrecen
15:00 CET				Stadium: Bestrong Sportcentrum

27 March 2027 21	HSE	v	Hajdúböszörmény	Hajdúszoboszló
15:00 CET				Stadium: Bocskai Stadion

3 April 2027 22	DEAC II	v	HSE	Debrecen
15:30 CEST				Stadium: DEAC Stadion

10 April 2027 23	HSE	v	Ebes	Hajdúszoboszló
15:30 CEST				Stadium: Bocskai Stadion

17 April 2026 24	Sárréti DSK (Sárrétudvari)	v	HSE	Sárrétudvari
16:00 CEST				Stadium: Sporttelep

24 April 2027 25	HSE	v	BUSE (Berettyóújfalu)	Hajdúszoboszló
16:00 CEST				Stadium: Bocskai Stadion

1 May 2026 26	Püspökladány	v	HSE	Püspökladány
16:30 CEST				Stadium: Sporttelep

8 May 2027 27	HSE	v	Hajdúdorog	Hajdúszoboszló
16:30 CEST				Stadium: Bocskai Stadion

1 May 2026 28	Balmazújváros	v	HSE	Balmazújváros
16:30 CEST				Stadium: Városi Stadion

22 May 2027 29	HSE	v	Létavértes	Hajdúszoboszló
17:00 CEST				Stadium: Bocskai Stadion

29 May 2026 30	Hajdúsámson	v	HSE	Hajdúsámson
17:00 CEST				Stadium: Hajdúsámson Sporttelep

Source: MLSZ Adatbank

=== Vármegyei Kupa ===
In Hungarian football, the Vármegyei Kupa (County Cup) system is a competition series where county directorates under the control of the Hungarian Football Association (MLSZ) set the competition rules and organize the tournaments for the county's amateur teams. May qualify for the first round of the 2027–28 Magyar Kupa (Hungarian Cup) from this season of the Vármegyei Kupa (County Cup).

If the result is a draw in regular time, the team from the lower division advances. If the result is a draw in regular time in a match between teams of the same division and there is no extra time, progression will be decided by kicks from the penalty spot in accordance with the provisions of the Laws of the Game of Football.

Win Draw Loss Fixtures

31 July 2026 1st	HSE (tier 4)	20–1	Újszentmargita (tier 6)	Hajdúszoboszló
20:00 CEST	Drobina 4', 17', 29', 36', 38', 74'; Bordán 9', 30'; Dobi 12', 32'; Tóth 21', 24' (pen.), 34', 71', 84'; Karika 47'; B. Kovács 54'; Pallagi 59' (pen.); Sallai 63'; Mezei 65'	Report	Nyiri 73'	Stadium: Bocskai Stadion; Referee: Tamás Nazsa; Assistant referees: Ádám Papp, Sándor Zurbó
Note: • Hajdúszoboszló: Kiss — Szécsi (Sallai (substituted on) 46'), L. Tóth, Bordán (B. Kovács (substituted on) 46'), Dobi (Potor (substituted on) 46'), Drobina, Csordás-Gurbán (Butor (substituted on) 46'), Mezei, Karika, Sinyi (Gomes (substituted on) 46'), Pallagi • Coach: László Szabó

9 August 2026 2nd	Zsáka (tier 6)	0–8	HSE (tier 4)	Zsáka
17:00 CEST	R. Nagy (red card) 41'	Report	Potor 7', 20'; Ménes 30'; Tóth 42' (pen.), 60'; Drobina 65', 67'; Szathmári 89'	Stadium: Sportpálya; Referee: János László; Assistant referees: Sándor Zurbó, Lőrinc Vass
Note: • Hajdúszoboszló: Domonkos — Ménes (B. Kovács (substituted on) 46'), Potor, Butor, L. Tóth, Drobina (Szathmári (substituted on) 70'), Vaskó (Z. Éles (substituted on) 46'), Mezei, Karika (Bordán (substituted on) 46'), Sinyi, Pallagi • Coach: László Szabó

16 September 2026 3rd	HSE (tier 4)	0–2	Hajdúsámson (tier 4)	Hajdúszoboszló
18:00 CEST	Potor (yellow card) 26'; Z. Éles (yellow card) 70'; Ménes (yellow card) 81'	Report	J. Nagy (yellow card) 22'; Sidibe (yellow card) 44'; Erdős 51'; Virág (yellow card) 47' (goal) 65'; I. Nagy (yellow card) 74'	Stadium: Bocskai Stadion; Referee: Zsombor Rizán; Assistant referees: László Szűcs, Balázs Gál
Note: • Hajdúszoboszló: Bákonyi — Kónya, Potor (Dobi (substituted on) 46'), L. Tóth (Drobina (substituted on) 46'), Sallai (Z. Éles (substituted on) 60'), Ménes, Szathmári, Csordás-Gurbán (Butor (substituted on) 46'), Sinyi ( Karika (substituted on) 60'), Vaskó, Mezei • Coach: László Szabó

Note: tier 4: Megyei Bajnokság I • tier 5: Megyei Bajnokság II • tier 6: Megyei Bajnokság III
Source: MLSZ Adatbank (Data Bank of MLSZ)

== Statistics ==
As of match played 14 November 2026

=== Appearances ===
The following 23 players made appearances for Hajdúszoboszlói SE's first team during the season.
The number shows the number of steps on the pitch (starting+substitute).
Includes all competitions for senior teams.
The gold color indicates the maximum appearances only in the competition in which the team has already played at least three matches.

No.	Pos.	Player	Megyei Bajnokság I (Domestic league)	Magyar Kupa (Domestic cup)	Vármegyei Kupa (County cup)	Season total	Ref.
1	GK	(Hungary) Norbert Bákonyi	12 (12+0)	—	1 (1+0)	13 (13+0)	
4	MF	(Hungary) Benedek Kovács	0	—	2 (0+2)	2 (0+2)	
5	DF	(Hungary) Krisztián Szécsi	0	—	1 (1+0)	1 (1+0)	
5	MF	(Hungary) Máté Ménes	12 (12+0)	—	2 (2+0)	14 (14+0)	
6	MF	(Hungary) Csaba Kónya	12 (12+0)	—	1 (1+0)	13 (13+0)	
7	DF	(Hungary) Márk Máté Potor	11 (0+11)	—	3 (2+1)	14 (2+12)	
8	MF	(Hungary) Levente Butor	12 (8+4)	—	3 (1+2)	15 (9+6)	
9	FW	(Hungary) Lajos Tóth	13 (13+0)	—	3 (3+0)	16 (16+0)	
10	MF	(Hungary) Csaba Sallai	11 (9+2)	—	2 (1+1)	13 (10+3)	
11	FW	(Hungary) Attila Bordán	12 (0+12)	—	2 (1+1)	14 (1+13)	
13	DF	(Hungary) Aurél Vaskó	13 (13+0)	—	2 (2+0)	15 (15+0)	
14	MF	(Hungary) Roberto Gomes Schneider	12 (11+1)	—	1 (0+1)	13 (11+2)	
16	MF	(Hungary) Zsolt Szathmári (c)	12 (12+0)	—	2 (1+1)	14 (13+1)	
17	FW	(Hungary) Martin Drobina	13 (12+1)	—	3 (3+0)	16 (15+1)	
19	MF	(Hungary) Miklós Csordás-Gurbán	8 (0+8)	—	2 (2+0)	10 (2+8)	
23	MF	(Hungary) Zoltán Éles	6 (2+4)	—	2 (0+2)	8 (2+6)	
25	GK	(Hungary) Károly Kiss	1 (0+1)	—	1 (1+0)	2 (1+1)	
25	GK	(Hungary) Dávid Domonkos	8 (1+7)	—	1 (1+0)	9 (2+7)	
33	DF	(Hungary) Balázs Mezei	13 (11+2)	—	3 (3+0)	16 (14+2)	
39	FW	(Hungary) Balázs Karika	13 (6+7)	—	3 (3+0)	16 (9+7)	
55	MF	(Hungary) Tamás Sinyi	8 (1+7)	—	3 (3+0)	11 (4+7)	
69	FW	(Hungary) Bence Máté Dobi	13 (2+11)	—	2 (1+1)	15 (3+12)	
77	DF	(Hungary) János Pallagi	12 (6+6)	—	2 (2+0)	14 (8+6)	

=== Goal scorers ===
Includes all competitions for senior teams. The list is sorted by squad number when season-total goals are equal. Players with no goals not included in the list.
We indicate in parentheses how many of the goals scored by the player from penalties.

Rank	No.	Pos.	Player	Megyei Bajnokság I (Domestic league)	Magyar Kupa (Domestic cup)	Vármegyei Kupa (County cup)	Season total	Ref.
1	9	FW	(Hungary) Lajos Tóth	20 (3)	—	7 (2)	27 (5)	
2	14	FW	(Hungary) Martin Drobina	7	—	8	15	
3	10	MF	(Hungary) Csaba Sallai	7	—	1	8	
4	13	FW	(Hungary) Bence Dobi	4	—	2	6	
5	5	DF	(Hungary) Máté Ménes	3	—	1	4	
5	11	FW	(Hungary) Attila Bordán	2	—	2	4	
7	6	MF	(Hungary) Csaba Kónya	3	—	0	3	
7	7	MF	(Hungary) Márk Potor	1	—	2	3	
7	39	FW	(Hungary) Balázs Karika	2	—	1	3	
10	8	MF	(Hungary) Levente Butor	2	—	0	2	
10	13	DF	(Hungary) Balázs Mezei	1	—	1	2	
10	77	DF	(Hungary) János Pallagi	1	—	1 (1)	2 (1)	
13	4	MF	(Hungary) Benedek Kovács	0	—	1	1	
13	16	MF	(Hungary) Zsolt Szathmári	0	—	1	1	
13	55	DF	(Hungary) Aurél Vaskó	1	—	0	1	
Own goals				4	—	0	4	
Total				58 (4)	—	28 (3)	86 (7)	

=== Penalties ===
Date	Penalty Taker	Scored	Opponent	Competition
31 July 2026	Lajos Tóth	Yes	Újszentmargita (H)	Vármegyei Kupa (County Cup), First round
31 July 2026	János Pallagi	Yes	Újszentmargita (H)	Vármegyei Kupa (County Cup), First round
9 August 2026	Lajos Tóth	Yes	Zsáka (A)	Vármegyei Kupa (County Cup), Second round
29 August 2026	Lajos Tóth	Yes	Vámospércs (H)	Megyei Bajnokság, Round 2
5 September 2026	Lajos Tóth	Yes	Monostorpályi (H)	Megyei Bajnokság, Round 3
10 October 2026	Csaba Kónya	Yes	Ebes (A)	Megyei Bajnokság, Round 8
7 November 2026	Lajos Tóth	Yes	Hajdúdorog (A)	Megyei Bajnokság, Round 12

Note: (H) – Home; (A) – Away

=== Clean Sheets ===
Includes all competitions for senior teams. The list is sorted by squad number when season-total clean sheets are equal. Numbers in parentheses represent games where both goalkeepers participated and both kept a clean sheet; the number in parentheses is awarded to the goalkeeper who was substituted on, whilst a full clean sheet is awarded to the goalkeeper who was on the field at the start of play.

Rank	No.	Goalkeeper	Megyei Bajnokság I (Domestic league)		Magyar Kupa (Domestic cup)		Vármegyei Kupa (County cup)		Season total	
Rank	No.	Goalkeeper	Cs/App	Cs %	Cs/App	Cs %	Cs/App	Cs %	Cs/App	Cs %
1	25	(Hungary) Dávid Domonkos	4/8	50.00%	—		1/1	100.00%	5/9	50.00%
1	89	(Hungary) Norbert Bákonyi	6/12	50.00%	—		0/1	0.00%	6/13	46.15%
3	3	(Hungary) Zoltán Bánhegyi	—/—	—	—		—/—	—	—/—	—
3	25	(Hungary) Károly Kiss	0/1	0.00%	—		0/1	0.00%	0/2	0.00%
3	89	(Hungary) Ákos Sávolt	—/—	—	—		—/—	—	—/—	—
Total			6		—		1		7	

=== Hat-tricks ===
Player	Against	Result	Goals	Date	Competition	Ref.
Martin Drobina ^{6}	Újszentmargita (H)	20–1	4', 17', 29', 36', 38', 74'	31 July 2026	Vármegyei Kupa (County Cup), First round	
Lajos Tóth ^{5}	Újszentmargita (H)	20–1	21', 24' (pen.), 34', 71', 84'	31 July 2026	Vármegyei Kupa (County Cup), First round	
Martin Drobina ^{5}	Hajdúböszörmény (A)	8–0	23', 26', 35', 66', 68'	26 September 2026	Megyei Bajnokság I, Round 6	
Lajos Tóth	Sárrétudvari (H)	5–1	49', 58', 88'	17 October 2026	Megyei Bajnokság I, Round 9	
Csaba Sallai	Berettyóújfalu (A)	4–0	15', 32', 37'	24 October 2026	Megyei Bajnokság I, Round 10	
Lajos Tóth ^{4}	Hajdúdorog (A)	5–2	21', 29', 83', 90' (pen.)	7 November 2026	Megyei Bajnokság I, Round 12	
Lajos Tóth	Balmazújváros (H)	8–0	63', 77', 90'	14 November 2026	Megyei Bajnokság I, Round 13	

Note: (H) – Home; (A) – Away
^{4} – player scored 4 goals; ^{5} – player scored 5 goals; ^{6} – player scored 6 goals

=== Disciplinary record ===
Includes all competitions for senior teams. The list is sorted by red cards, then yellow cards (and by squad number when total cards are equal). Players with no cards not included in the list.

No.	Pos.	Player	Megyei Bajnokság I (Domestic league)			Magyar Kupa (Domestic cup)			Vármegyei Kupa (County cup)			Season total			Ref.
No.	Pos.	Player	Yellow card	(yellow card) (yellow-red card)	Red card	Yellow card	(yellow card) (yellow-red card)	Red card	Yellow card	(yellow card) (yellow-red card)	Red card	Yellow card	(yellow card) (yellow-red card)	Red card	Ref.
89	GK	(Hungary) Norbert Bákonyi	0	0	1	—			0	0	0	0	0	1	
77	DF	(Hungary) János Pallagi	4	0	0	—			0	0	0	4	0	0	
14	FW	(Hungary) Martin Drobina	3	0	0	—			0	0	0	3	0	0	
5	DF	(Hungary) Máté Ménes	0	0	0	—			1	0	0	1	0	0	
6	MF	(Hungary) Csaba Kónya	1	0	0	—			0	0	0	1	0	0	
7	MF	(Hungary) Márk Potor	0	0	0	—			1	0	0	1	0	0	
8	MF	(Hungary) Levente Butor	1	0	0	—			0	0	0	1	0	0	
10	MF	(Hungary) Csaba Sallai	1	0	0	—			0	0	0	1	0	0	
13	FW	(Hungary) Bence Dobi	1	0	0	—			0	0	0	1	0	0	
16	MF	(Hungary) Zsolt Szathmári	1	0	0	—			0	0	0	1	0	0	
23	MF	(Hungary) Zoltán Éles	0	0	0	—			1	0	0	1	0	0	
39	FW	(Hungary) Balázs Karika	1	0	0	—			0	0	0	1	0	0	
Total			12	0	1	—			3	0	0	15	0	1	

== See also ==
- List of Hajdúszoboszlói SE seasons
