= List of Hajdúszoboszlói SE seasons =

Hajdúszoboszlói Sport Egyesület is a Hungarian association football club based in Hajdúszoboszló, Hajdú–Bihar County.

== Key ==
- NB I = Nemzeti Bajnokság I
- NB II = Nemzeti Bajnokság II
- NB III = Nemzeti Bajnokság III
- MB I = Megyei Bajnokság I
- MB II = Megyei Bajnokság II
- Pld = Matches played
- W = Matches won
- D = Matches drawn
- L = Matches lost
- GF = Goals for
- GA = Goals against
- Pts = Points
- W% = Matches won percentage
- Pos = Final position
- Canc = Cancelled
- CQ-R1 = County first qualifying round
- CQ-R2 = County second qualifying round
- CQ-R3 = County third qualifying round
- CQ-R4 = County fourth qualifying round
- CQ-R5 = County fifth qualifying round
- CQ-R6 = County sixth qualifying round
- QR1 = First qualifying round
- QR2 = Second qualifying round
- QR3 = Third qualifying round
- R128 = Round of 128
- R64 = Round of 64
- R32 = Round of 32
- R16 = Round of 16
- R1 = Round 1
- R2 = Round 2
- R3 = Round 3
- R4 = Round 4
- R5 = Round 5
- Grp = Group stage
- QF = Quarter-finals
- SF = Semi-finals

Winners	Runners-up or Second place	Third place	Play-offs*	Promoted ↑	Relegated ↓

== Seasons ==
Seasons of Hajdúszoboszlói SE
Season	League												Magyar Kupa (Hungarian Cup)		Megyei Kupa (County Cup)	
Season	Division	Tier	Pld	W	D	L	GF	GA	Pts	W%	Pos	Ref.	Result	Ref.	Result	Ref.
2006–07	NB III ↓	3	26	1	9	16	19	52	12	3.85	14th of 14 ↓		N/A		Did not arranged	
2007–08	MB I ↑	4	34	27	6	1	117	27	87	79.41	1st of 18 ↑		CQ-R2		Did not arranged	
2008–09	NB III ↓	3	30	8	4	18	30	57	28	26.67	15th of 16 ↓		CQ-R4		Did not arranged	
2009–10	MB I ↑	4	30	20	5	5	87	39	65	66.67	1st of 16 ↑		CQ-R4		Did not arranged	
2010–11	NB III	3	30	10	8	12	34	38	38	33.33	11th of 16		CQ-R3		Did not arranged	
2011–12	NB III	3	30	16	6	8	51	25	54	53.33	6th of 16		CQ-R3		Did not arranged	
2012–13	NB III ↓	3	26	11	4	11	43	40	37	42.30	7th of 14 ↓		CQ-R4		Did not arranged	
2013–14	MB I	4	30	14	7	9	81	45	49	46.67	7th of 16		CQ-R3		Did not arranged	
2014–15	MB I	4	30	19	5	6	89	29	62	63.33	3rd of 16		CQ-R6		Did not arranged	
2015–16	MB I	4	30	11	11	8	52	42	56	36.67	5th of 16		R1 (R128)		Did not arranged	
2016–17	MB I	4	30	11	11	8	52	42	44	36.67	8th of 16		CQ-R1		Did not arranged	
2017–18	MB I	4	30	12	9	9	93	54	45	40.00	9th of 16		CQ-R3		Did not arranged	
2018–19	MB I	4	30	14	3	13	83	56	45	46.67	6th of 16		CQ-R2		Did not arranged	
2019–20	MB I	4	18^{C}	14	2	2	56	10	44	77.77	2nd of 16		R1 (R128)		Did not arranged	
2020–21	MB I ↑	4	30	28	1	1	172	15	85	93.33	1st of 16 ↑		Did not qualify		R5	
2021–22	NB III	3	38	20	10	8	74	39	70	52.63	4th of 20		R1 (R128)		Did not qualify	
2022–23	NB III ↓	3	38	12	10	16	45	50	46	31.58	17th of 20 ↓		R1 (R128)		Did not qualify	
2023–24	MB I	4	26	17	3	6	91	25	54	65.38	3rd of 14		R1 (R128)		R2	
2024–25	MB I	4	30	23	3	4	91	26	72	76.67	2nd of 16		Did not qualify		Winners	
2025–26	MB I	4	30	24	3	3	122	28	75	80.00	2nd of 16		R1 (R128)		R3	
2026–27	MB I	4	0	0	0	0	0	0	0				Did not qualify		R2	

== Notes ==
C.In 2019–20 season after round 18 cancelled due to the COVID-19 pandemic.
