= 2025–26 Hajdúszoboszlói SE season =

Aqua-General Hajdúszoboszlói SE
2025–26 season
- Coach: László Szabó
- Stadium: Bocskai Stadion
- Megyei Bajnokság I: (silver) 2nd place
- Magyar Kupa: First round
- Vármegyei Kupa: Third round
- Top goalscorer: League: Lajos Tóth (32); All: Lajos Tóth (32)
- Biggest win: 17 goals, (18–1) v Létavértes (H), Megyei Bajnokság, R14, 8 November 2025
- Biggest defeat: 4 goals, (1–5) v Tiszafüred (H), Magyar Kupa, R1, 2 August 2025, (1–5) v Hajdúnánás (H), Megyei Bajnokság, R25, 25 April 2026
- All statistics correct as of 30 May 2026 (Completed).

The 2025–26 season is Hajdúszoboszlói SE's 83rd competitive season, 3rd consecutive season in the Megyei Bajnokság I and 113th year in existence as a football club. In addition to the domestic league (tier 4), Hajdúszoboszló participate in this season's editions of the Magyar Kupa (domestic cup) and Vármegyei Kupa (county cup).

Since August 2020 they are sponsored by Aqua-General, so the official name for the team is Aqua-General Hajdúszoboszlói Sportegyesület.

== Kits ==
Home	Away

== First team squad ==
Source: Sofascore

As of 26 February 2026

Note: Flags indicate national team as defined under FIFA eligibility rules; some limited exceptions apply. Players may hold more than one non-FIFA nationality.

No.	Pos.	Nation	Player
4	MF	HUN	Benedek Kovács
6	MF	HUN	Csaba Kónya
7	DF	HUN	Márk Máté Potor
8	FW	HUN	Martin Alex Kovács
9	FW	HUN	Lajos András Tóth
10	MF	HUN	Csaba Sallai
11	FW	HUN	Attila Bordán
13	DF	HUN	Roberto Gomes Schneider
14	MF	HUN	Patrik Békési
16	MF	HUN	Zsolt Szathmári (captain)
19	MF	HUN	Patrik Fábián

No.	Pos.	Nation	Player
20	MF	HUN	Tamás Sinyi
22	MF	HUN	Levente Csaba Butor
23	MF	HUN	Zoltán Éles
25	GK	HUN	Dávid Domonkos
33	DF	HUN	Balázs Mezei
39	FW	HUN	Balázs Bence Karika
77	DF	HUN	János Pallagi
89	GK	HUN	Ákos Péter Sávolt
91	FW	HUN	Bogát Bárány
—	GK	HUN	Levente Király
—	DF	HUN	Márk Bogár

== Friendlies ==
Win Draw Loss Fixtures

== Competitions ==
=== Overall record ===
Competition	First match	Last match	Starting round	Final position	Record							
Competition	First match	Last match	Starting round	Final position	Pld	W	D	L	GF	GA	GD	Win %
Megyei Bajnokság I	9 August 2025	30 May 2026	Matchday 1	(silver) 2nd place	30	24	3	3	122	28	+94	80.00
Magyar Kupa	2 August 2025	2 August 2025	First round	First round	1	0	0	1	1	5	−4	0.00
Vármegyei Kupa	3 September 2025	17 September 2025	Second round	Third round	2	1	0	1	5	3	+2	50.00
Total					33	25	3	5	128	36	+92	75.76

Last updated: 30 May 2026 (completed)
Source: Sofascore

=== Megyei Bajnokság I ===
==== League table ====
Pos	Team	Pld	W	D	L	GF	GA	GD	Pts	Promotion or relegation
1	Hajdúnánás (C)	30	27	2	1	142	25	+117	83	Qualification for promotion play-offs
2	Aqua-General HSE (Hajdúszoboszló)	30	24	3	3	122	28	+94	75	
3	Balmazújváros	30	20	3	7	85	44	+41	63	
4	Hajdúsámson	30	19	5	6	88	39	+49	62	
5	Monostorpályi	30	19	3	8	85	41	+44	60	
6	Sárréti DSK (Sárrétudvari)	30	13	8	9	60	52	+8	47	
7	DEAC II	30	12	5	13	74	62	+12	41	
8	BUSE (Berettyóújfalu)	30	13	1	16	71	63	+8	40	
9	Nyíradony (Note: 3 penalty point deducted from Nyíradony)	30	10	7	13	42	67	−25	34	
10	Kaba	30	7	9	14	53	62	−9	30	
11	Bestrong (Debrecen)	30	9	5	16	51	65	−14	32	
12	Püspökladány	30	9	4	17	57	84	−27	31	
13	Téglás (Note: 3 penalty point deducted from Téglás)	30	6	10	14	33	54	−21	25	
14	Bocskai (Vámospércs)	30	7	4	19	43	94	−51	25	
15	Hajdúböszörmény (R)	30	6	7	17	37	58	−21	25	Relegation to Megyei Bajnokság II
16	Létavértes (R)	30	1	0	29	29	234	−205	3	Relegation to Megyei Bajnokság II

Updated to match(es) played on 31 May 2026 (completed). Source: Hungarian Football Federation
(C) Champions; (R) Relegated

==== Results summary ====
Overall								Home						Away					
Pld	W	D	L	GF	GA	GD	Pts	W	D	L	GF	GA	GD	W	D	L	GF	GA	GD
30	24	3	3	122	28	+94	75	13	0	2	59	17	+42	11	3	1	63	11	+52

Last updated: 30 May 2026 (completed).
Source: Sofascore

==== Results by round ====
A = Away; H = Home; W = Win; D = Draw; L = Loss

Round	1	2	3	4	5	6	7	8	9	10	11	12	13	14	15	16	17	18	19	20	21	22	23	24	25	26	27	28	29	30
Ground	H	A	H	A	H	A	H	A	H	A	H	H	A	H	A	A	H	A	H	A	H	A	H	A	H	A	A	H	A	H
Result	W	W	W	L	W	W	W	W	L	D	W	W	W	W	W	D	W	W	W	D	W	W	W	W	L	W	W	W	W	W
Position	6	5	2	5	4	2	2	2	2	2	2	2	2	2	2	2	2	2	2	2	2	2	2	2	2	2	2	2	2	2
Points	3	6	9	9	12	15	18	21	21	22	25	28	31	34	37	38	41	44	47	48	51	54	57	60	60	63	66	69	72	75

Updated to match(es) played on 30 May 2026 (completed). Source:

==== Results overview ====
All results are indicated from the perspective of Hajdúszoboszlói SE.
We indicate in parentheses the number of round.
Win Draw Loss Postponed

Opposition	Home score	Away score	Aggregate score	Double
Balmazújváros	4–3 (17)	2–0 (2)	6–3	Yes
BUSE (Berettyóújfalu)	2–0 (28)	2–0 (13)	4–0	Yes
Bestrong	2–1 (1)	2–2 (16)	4–3	No
Bocskai (Vámospércs)	3–0 (21)	8–1 (6)	11–1	Yes
DEAC II	3–1 (19)	1–2 (4)	4–3	No
Hajdúsámson	2–0 (7)	1–0 (22)	3–0	Yes
Hajdúböszörmény	3–0 (12)	7–0 (27)	10–0	Yes
Hajdúnánás	1–5 (25)	3–3 (10)	4–8	No
Kaba	3–0 (5)	1–1 (20)	4–1	No
Létavértes	18–1 (14)	16–0 (29)	34–1	Yes
Monostorpályi	0–3 (9)	3–1 (24)	3–4	No
Nyíradony	5–1 (11)	7–1 (26)	12–2	Yes
Püspökladány	4–1 (23)	5–0 (8)	9–1	Yes
Sárréti DSK (Sárrétudvari)	6–1 (30)	3–0 (15)	9–1	Yes
Téglás	3–0 (3)	2–0 (18)	5–0	Yes

==== Matches ====
Win Draw Loss Fixtures Postponed

9 August 2025 1	AG Hajdúszoboszló	2–1	Bestrong	Hajdúszoboszló
17:00 CEST	Sinyi (yellow card) 36'; Karika 90'; Kónya 90+3'	Report	Ferenczi 26'; Hegedűs (yellow card) 69'; Áros (yellow card) 80'	Stadium: Bocskai Sporttelep; Attendance: 150; Referee: Sándor Gulyás; Assistant referees: Imre Hajdú, Bence Nagy
Note: • Hajdúszoboszló: Domonkos — Kónya, L. Tóth (Pallagi (substituted on) 90+3'), Gomes (M. Kovács (substituted on) 27'), Szathmári, Mezei, Sinyi (Z. Éles (substituted on) 46'), Butor, Bogár, Karika, Sallai (Potor (substituted on) 77'), Butor (Bordán (substituted on) 77') • Coach: László Szabó

16 August 2025 2	Balmazújváros	0–2	AG Hajdúszoboszló	Balmazújváros
17:00 CEST	Csatári (yellow card) 35'; B. Kovács (yellow card) 38'; Linzenbold (yellow card) 66'; Galla (yellow card) 76'; Somogyi (yellow card) 88'	Report	Z. Éles (yellow card) 21'; Bogár (red card) 32'; Kónya 25', 61'; M. Kovács (yellow card) 81'	Stadium: Városi Stadion; Attendance: 150; Referee: Krisztián Forgács; Assistant referees: Zoltán Kovács, Marcell Marinka
Note: • Hajdúszoboszló: Domonkos — Kónya, L. Tóth (M. Kovács (substituted on) 70'), Szathmári, Sinyi (Potornai (substituted on) 89'), Butor (Potor (substituted on) 55'), Z. Éles, Bogár, Sallai (Karika (substituted on) 55'), Pallagi, Mezei (Gomes (substituted on) 70') • Coach: László Szabó

23 August 2025 3	AG Hajdúszoboszló	3–0	Téglás	Hajdúszoboszló
17:00 CEST	L. Tóth 22'; Karika 42', 72'; Békési (yellow card) 90+1'	Report	B. Szabó (yellow card) 29'; K. Nagy (yellow card) 56'; J. Kiss (yellow card) 75'; Dudás (yellow card) 89'	Stadium: Bocskai Sporttelep; Attendance: 150; Referee: Imre Hajdú; Assistant referees: Dávid Szentesi, Krisztián Szigeti
Note: • Hajdúszoboszló: Domonkos — Kónya, L. Tóth, Gomes, Szathmári, Butor (M. Kovács (substituted on) 64'), Karika (Békési (substituted on) 74'), Sinyi, Sallai (Potor (substituted on) 64'), Pallagi, Mezei (Bordán (substituted on) 74') • Coach: László Szabó

30 August 2025 4	DEAC II	2–1	AG Hajdúszoboszló	Debrecen
17:00 CEST	Bora (yellow card) 5'; Szopkó 31'; Bora 72'; Dari (yellow card) 85'; Molnár (yellow card) 90+2'; Kalmár (yellow card) 90+4'	Report	Butor (yellow card) 43'; L. Tóth 56' (pen.); Szathmári (yellow card) 90+5'	Stadium: DE Agrár-pálya; Attendance: 160; Referee: Tamás Kövér; Assistant referees: Balázs Gergely, Zalán Török
Note: • Hajdúszoboszló: Domonkos — Kónya, L. Tóth, Gomes (Z. Éles (substituted on) 46'), Szathmári, Butor (Potor (substituted on) 46'), Bogár (Sallai (substituted on) 46'), Karika, Sinyi (M. Kovács (substituted on) 46'), Pallagi, Mezei • Coach: László Szabó

6 September 2025 5	AG Hajdúszoboszló	3–0	Kaba	Hajdúszoboszló
15:30 CEST	Karika 3' (yellow card) 39'; Mezei 57'; L. Tóth 59'; Szathmári (yellow card) 61'	Report	P. Tóth (yellow card) 13' (On the bench); Molnár (yellow card) 40'; Plókai (yellow card) 83'	Stadium: Bocskai Sporttelep; Attendance: 170; Referee: Zsombor Rizán; Assistant referees: Tamás Bendik dr., Roland Hetrovics
Note: • Hajdúszoboszló: Domonkos (Sávolt (substituted on) 77') — Kónya, L. Tóth, Szathmári (Békési (substituted on) 64'), Bogár (Bordán (substituted on) 77'), Z. Éles, Butor (M. Kovács (substituted on) 64'), Karika (Sallai (substituted on) 64'), Sinyi, Pallagi (Potor (substituted on) 46'), Mezei (Gomes (substituted on) 64') • Coach: László Szabó

13 September 2025 6	Bocskai (Vámospércs)	1–8	AG Hajdúszoboszló	Vámospércs
15:30 CEST	Kolompár 14' (yellow card) 73'; K. Szabó (yellow card) 42'; N. Nagy (yellow card) 76'	Report	L. Tóth 36' (pen.), 70' (pen.), 79'; Z. Éles (yellow card) 40' (goal) 43'; M. Kovács 41'; Mezei 66'; Bordán 83', 86'	Stadium: Sportpálya; Attendance: 150; Referee: Felicián Varga; Assistant referees: Gergő Pécsi, József Potyók
Note: • Hajdúszoboszló: Domonkos (Sávolt (substituted on) 68') — Kónya, M. Kovács (Sallai (substituted on) 68'), L. Tóth, Szathmári (Butor (substituted on) 68'), Sinyi, Z. Éles, Bogár, Karika (Bordán (substituted on) 77'), Pallagi (Potor (substituted on) 46'), Mezei (Gomes (substituted on) 68') • Coach: László Szabó

20 September 2025 7	AG Hajdúszoboszló	2–0	Hajdúsámson	Hajdúszoboszló
15:30 CEST	Z. Éles (yellow card) 21'; Sinyi (yellow card) 47'; Karika 90'; Sallai 90+5'	Report	Kanalas (yellow card) 62'; J. Nagy (yellow card) 70'	Stadium: Bocskai Sporttelep; Attendance: 150; Referee: Norbert Nagy; Assistant referees: Zsombor Rizán, Ákos Tóth
Note: • Hajdúszoboszló: Domonkos — Kónya, L. Tóth (Sallai (substituted on) 80'), Mezei, Szathmári, Sinyi (Gomes (substituted on) 80'), Butor (Potor (substituted on) 46'), Z. Éles, Karika (Békési (substituted on) 90+2'), Pallagi, B. Bárány (M. Kovács (substituted on) 46') • Coach: László Szabó

27 September 2025 8	Püspökladány	0–5	AG Hajdúszoboszló	Püspökladány
15:00 CEST	Németh (yellow card) 41'; Mester (yellow card) 43'; Baranyi (yellow card) 89'	Report	Karika 7', 83'; Goncalves 34' (o.g.); Szathmári 64'; B. Bárány 69'; Kónya (yellow card) 74'	Stadium: Sporttelep; Attendance: 120; Referee: Zsombor Rizán; Assistant referees: Attila Kiss dr., Tamás Vékony
Note: • Hajdúszoboszló: Domonkos — Kónya, Szathmári (B. Kovács (substituted on) 73'), Sallai (Potor (substituted on) 46'), Mezei (Bordán (substituted on) 82'), Z. Éles (Potornai (substituted on) 82'), Butor (Gomes (substituted on) 46'), Karika, Sinyi, Pallagi (Bogár (substituted on) 46'), B. Bárány • Coach: László Szabó

4 October 2025 9	AG Hajdúszoboszló	0–3	Monostorpályi	Hajdúszoboszló
14:00 CEST	Pallagi (yellow card) 42'; Szathmári (yellow card) 66'; Z. Éles (yellow card) 67'	Report	Kereszti 9', 18'; Bojti 12'; Szilágyi (yellow card) 37'; Bákonyi (yellow card) 45'; Ménes (red card) 45'; Zurbó (yellow card) 70'; Sz. Nagy (yellow card) 72'	Stadium: Bocskai Sporttelep; Attendance: 180; Referee: Tamás Kövér; Assistant referees: Imre Hajdú, János Papp
Note: • Hajdúszoboszló: Domonkos — Butor (B. Kovács (substituted on) 86'), Mezei (Fábián (substituted on) 78'), Szathmári, Sinyi (Potor (substituted on) 46'), Z. Éles, Bogár, Karika, Sallai (Bordán (substituted on) 86'), Pallagi (Gomes (substituted on) 78'), B. Bárány • Coach: László Szabó

11 October 2025 10	Hajdúnánás	3–3	AG Hajdúszoboszló	Hajdúnánás
14:00 CEST	Pelles (yellow card) 17' (goal) 21'; Ujvári 25', 37' (yellow card) 39'; Varga (yellow card) 68'; Bencze (yellow card) 88'	Report	Z. Éles 43'; Butor (yellow card) 56'; Kónya 84' (pen.); Pallagi (yellow card) 85'; Szathmári (yellow card) 90'	Stadium: Sporttelep; Attendance: 200; Referee: Norbert Nagy; Assistant referees: Ádám Kovács, Armand Kaprinyák
Note: • Hajdúszoboszló: Domonkos — Kónya, Potor (Gomes (substituted on) 43'), Szathmári, Sinyi (Bordán (substituted on) 77'), Z. Éles, Mezei, Karika, Sallai (Butor (substituted on) 46'), Pallagi (Potornai (substituted on) 87'), B. Bárány (Békési (substituted on) 87') • Coach: László Szabó

17 October 2025 11	AG Hajdúszoboszló	5–1	Nyíradony	Hajdúszoboszló
18:00 CEST	L. Tóth 4' (pen.); Szathmári (yellow card) 16'; B. Bárány 20', 51', 64' (yellow card) 80'; Pallagi (yellow card) 66'; Butor (yellow card) 72'; Karika (yellow card) 83'; Potor 89'	Report	Németi (yellow card) 5'; B. Szabó (yellow card) 45' (goal) 69'	Stadium: Bocskai Sporttelep; Attendance: 120; Referee: Krisztián Forgács; Assistant referees: Barna Szima, Tamás Zámbó
Note: • Hajdúszoboszló: Sávolt — Kónya, Potor, Butor (B. Kovács (substituted on) 84'), L. Tóth (Bordán (substituted on) 71'), Szathmári (Békési (substituted on) 71'), Sinyi, Mezei, Karika, Pallagi (Potornai (substituted on) 71'), B. Bárány • Coach: László Szabó

24 October 2025 12	AG Hajdúszoboszló	3–0	Hajdúböszörmény	Hajdúszoboszló
14:00 CEST	L. Tóth 37', 59' (yellow card) 39'; Sinyi (yellow card) 64'; Fábián 88'	Report	Révész (yellow card) 15'	Stadium: Bocskai Sporttelep; Attendance: 130; Referee: Tamás Kriston; Assistant referees: Mihály Tóth, Gábor Horváth
Note: • Hajdúszoboszló: Sávolt — Kónya, Butor, L. Tóth, B. Bárány (Fábián (substituted on) 80'), Sinyi, Z. Éles (Bordán (substituted on) 69'), Mezei, Karika, Sallai (B. Kovács (substituted on) 61'), Pallagi (Potor (substituted on) 61') • Coach: László Szabó

1 November 2025 13	BUSE (Berettyóújfalu)	0–2	AG Hajdúszoboszló	Berettyóújfalu
13:30 CET	Békési (yellow card) 25'; Ékes (yellow card) 35'; Virányi (red card) 35'; Magyar (yellow card) 51'; Csordás (yellow card) 70'	Report	Z. Éles (yellow card) 7'; B. Bárány (yellow card) 35' (goal) 47'; Bordán 82'	Stadium: Sportpálya; Attendance: 120; Referee: Tamás Nazsa; Assistant referees: Balázs Gergely, Dániel Szűcs
Note: • Hajdúszoboszló: Domonkos — Kónya, Butor (Sallai (substituted on) 65'), L. Tóth, Szathmári, Sinyi, Z. Éles, Mezei, Karika (Potor (substituted on) 65'), Pallagi (Bordán (substituted on) 71'), B. Bárány (Gomes (substituted on) 65') • Coach: László Szabó

8 November 2025 14	AG Hajdúszoboszló	18–1	Létavértes	Hajdúszoboszló
13:30 CET	Karika 5'; Sinyi 7', 29', 71'; Potor 9', 39'; L. Tóth 22', 31', 53', 56', 89', 90'; B. Bárány 34', 48', 70'; Kónya 42'; Butor 58'; B. Kovács 80'	Report	Szalma 16'; Razzak (yellow card) 76'	Stadium: Bocskai Sporttelep; Attendance: 110; Referee: Liza Sovány; Assistant referees: László Szűcs, Zoltán Gajdics
Note: • Hajdúszoboszló: Sávolt (Domonkos (substituted on) 46') — Kónya (Szathmári (substituted on) 72'), Potor (Pallagi (substituted on) 72'), L. Tóth, Gomes (Sallai (substituted on) 58'), Bordán (B. Kovács (substituted on) 58'), Potornai (Butor (substituted on) 58'), Sinyi, Mezei, Karika (M. Kovács (substituted on) 72'), B. Bárány • Coach: László Szabó

15 November 2025 15	Sárréti DSK (Sárrétudvari)	0–3	AG Hajdúszoboszló	Sárrétudvari
13:30 CET	T. Szabó 18'	Report	Szathmári (yellow card) 1'; L. Tóth (yellow card) 14' (goal) 28', 45'; Pallagi (yellow card) 36'; Kónya (yellow card) 63'; Karika (yellow card) 80'; Potor 82'	Stadium: Sporttelep; Attendance: 105; Referee: László Szűcs; Assistant referees: Flórián Gálfi, Krisztián Szigeti

21 November 2025 16	Bestrong	2–2	AG Hajdúszoboszló	Debrecen
18:00 CET	Katona (yellow card) 12'; Barabás (yellow card) 19'; Bartók 27'; Áros (yellow card) 32'; Ferenczi 49' (yellow card) 83'; Kuszkó (yellow card) 55'; Virág (yellow card) 90+2'	Report	Karika 13', 68' (yellow card) 57'; Z. Éles (red card) 90+5'	Stadium: Bestrong Sportcentrum; Attendance: 90; Referee: Balázs Gergely; Assistant referees: Máté Szakály, Máté Kalocsai

28 February 2026 17	AG Hajdúszoboszló	4–3	Balmazújváros	Hajdúszoboszló
14:00 CET	Kónya 6', 14', 71'; Bordán 25'	Report	Drobina 33'; Szathmári 78' (o.g.); Balla 80'	Stadium: Bocskai Sporttelep; Referee: Imre Hajdú; Assistant referees: Ádám Kovács, Armand Kaprinyák

7 March 2026 18	Téglás	0–2	AG Hajdúszoboszló	Téglás
15:00 CET	A. Nagy (yellow card) 48'	Report	Kónya 64'; B. Bárány 87'	Stadium: Téglási Sportpálya; Referee: Tamás Kövér; Assistant referees: Tamás Zámbó, Roland Kovács

14 March 2026 19	AG Hajdúszoboszló	3–1	DEAC II	Hajdúszoboszló
14:30 CET	Potor (yellow card) 31'; B. Bárány 51' (yellow card) 67'; Z. Éles 75'; Kónya 85' (pen.)		Potornai (yellow card) 90+4'	Stadium: Bocskai Sporttelep; Referee: Norbert Nagy; Assistant referees: Mihály Tóth, Boróka Kiss

21 March 2026 20	Kaba	1–1	AG Hajdúszoboszló	Kaba
15:00 CET	Plókai 19' (yellow card) 75'; P. Tóth (yellow card) 18'; Oláh (yellow card) 30'; Molnár (yellow card) 75'; Somogyi (yellow card) 87'	Report	Sallai 12'; Kónya (yellow card) 41'; Éles (yellow card) 42'	Stadium: Kabai Sportpálya; Attendance: 130; Referee: Imre Hajdú; Assistant referees: Tamás Czinege, Armand Kaprinyák
Note: • Hajdúszoboszló: Sávolt — Kónya, Potor, Butor, L. Tóth, Sallai (B. Kovács (substituted on) 80'), Szathmári (B. Bárány (substituted on) 46'), Éles (Sinyi (substituted on) 80'), Mezei, Gomes (Bordán (substituted on) 57'), Pallagi • Coach: László Szabó

28 March 2026 21	AG Hajdúszoboszló	3–0	Bocskai (Vámospércs)	Hajdúszoboszló
15:00 CET	Sinyi (yellow card) 18'; L. Tóth 79'; B. Bárány 86'; Potor 89'	Report	Medve (yellow card) 9'; Kolompár (yellow card) 18'; Pankotai (yellow card) 50'; Sarkadi (yellow card) 67'	Stadium: Bocskai Sporttelep; Attendance: 130; Referee: Tamás Tóth; Assistant referees: Ákos Tóth, Dániel Szűcs
Note: • Hajdúszoboszló: Bánhegyi (Sávolt (substituted on) 46') — Kónya, Potor, Butor (B. Kovács (substituted on) 64'), L. Tóth, Sallai (Szathmári (substituted on) 46'), Bordán (Mezei (substituted on) 46'), Sinyi, Pallagi, Karika (Gomes (substituted on) 46'), B. Bárány • Coach: László Szabó

4 April 2026 22	Hajdúsámson	0–1	AG Hajdúszoboszló	Hajdúsámson
15:30 CEST	Győri (yellow card) 12'; I. Nagy (yellow card) 56'	Report	Karika (yellow card) 53'; Kónya 57' (pen.); Bordán (yellow card) 69'	Stadium: Hajdúsámson Sporttelep; Attendance: 150; Referee: Tamás Kövér; Assistant referees: Tamás Nazsa, Roland Kovács
Note: • Hajdúszoboszló: Sávolt — Kónya, Butor, L. Tóth (B. Kovács (substituted on) 73'), Gomes (Potor (substituted on) 46'), Szathmári, Z. Éles, Mezei, Karika, Pallagi (Bordán (substituted on) 53'), B. Bárány (Fábián (substituted on) 88') • Coach: László Szabó

10 April 2026 23	AG Hajdúszoboszló	4–1	Püspökladány	Hajdúszoboszló
18:00 CEST	Z. Éles (yellow card) 36'; Mezei (yellow card) 38'; Fábián 51'; Butor 53'; Sinyi (yellow card) 63'; Sallai 66'; L. Tóth 87'	Report	Dobi 49'; Simon (yellow card) 57'; Goncalves (yellow card) 78'	Stadium: Bocskai Sporttelep; Attendance: 110; Referee: Zoltán Gecse; Assistant referees: Patrik Varga dr., Gábor Homoki
Note: • Hajdúszoboszló: Bánhegyi (Sávolt (substituted on) 46') — B. Kovács (Butor (substituted on) 46'), Potor, L. Tóth, Bordán (Fábián (substituted on) 46'), Szathmári, Sinyi, Z. Éles (Békési (substituted on) 74'), Mezei (Gomes (substituted on) 46'), Pallagi (Sallai (substituted on) 46'), B. Bárány (Rácsai (substituted on) 85') • Coach: László Szabó

18 April 2026 24	Monostorpályi	1–3	AG Hajdúszoboszló	Monostorpályi
16:00 CEST	Csörgő (yellow card) 31'; Kereszti 36'; Szilágyi (yellow card) 39'; Újvárosi (yellow card) 50'; Cseh (yellow card) 85'	Report	L. Tóth 42'; Z. Éles 55'; B. Bárány 58' (yellow card) 81'	Stadium: Vágó András Sporttelep; Attendance: 200; Referee: Tamás Nazsa; Assistant referees: Tamás Kriston, Ádám Kovács
Note: • Hajdúszoboszló: Sávolt — Kónya, L. Tóth, Sallai (Butor (substituted on) 54'), Szathmári, Sinyi, Z. Éles (Bordán (substituted on) 72'), Mezei (Gomes (substituted on) 54'), Karika, Pallagi (Potor (substituted on) 19'), B. Bárány • Coach: László Szabó

25 April 2026 25	AG Hajdúszoboszló	1–5	Hajdúnánás	Hajdúszoboszló
16:00 CEST	Szathmári (yellow card) 41'; Z. Éles (yellow card) 58'; Kónya 61' (pen.); Fábián (yellow card) 78'	Report	Ujvári 41'; Bohács 46'; G. Tóth (yellow card) 59'; Gellén 66' (pen.); Pelles 75', 85'	Stadium: Bocskai Sporttelep; Attendance: 180; Referee: Zsombor Rizán; Assistant referees: Máté Szakály, Tamás Kövér
Note: • Hajdúszoboszló: Sávolt — Kónya, Butor (Potor (substituted on) 56'), L. Tóth (B. Kovács (substituted on) 77'), Szathmári, Sinyi, Z. Éles, Mezei (Gomes (substituted on) 56'), Karika (Sallai (substituted on) 56'), Pallagi (Fábián (substituted on) 46'), B. Bárány (Bordán (substituted on) 77') • Coach: László Szabó

29 April 2026 26	Nyíradony	1–7	AG Hajdúszoboszló	Nyíradony
17:30 CEST	Bara (yellow card) 17'; B. Szabó (yellow card) 30'; Németi (yellow card) 30'; Tövisháti (yellow card) 52'; Tüzes 61'	Report	Sallai 19'; B. Bárány 30', 42'; Karika 35', 57'; Pallagi (yellow card) 35'; L. Tóth 66', 75'	Stadium: Nyíradony Városi Sporttelep; Attendance: 130; Referee: Tamás Kriston; Assistant referees: Zoltán Borkó, János Papp
Note: • Hajdúszoboszló: Domonkos (Bánhegyi (substituted on) 77') — Kónya, Butor (Gomes (substituted on) 66'), L. Tóth, Sallai (Fábián (substituted on) 77'), Szathmári (Sinyi (substituted on) 62'), Z. Éles, Mezei (B. Kovács (substituted on) 77'), Karika (Bordán (substituted on) 66'), Pallagi (Potor (substituted on) 46'), B. Bárány • Coach: László Szabó

9 May 2026 27	Hajdúböszörmény	0–7	AG Hajdúszoboszló	Hajdúböszörmény
16:30 CEST	Csecsődi (yellow card) 52'; Z. Szabó (yellow card) 71'	Report	Olajos 14' (o.g.); B. Bárány 21', 62', 70'; Z. Éles 27'; Bordán 42'; Sallai (yellow card) 60'; L. Tóth 87'	Stadium: Városi Sport- és Rendezvényközpont; Attendance: 130; Referee: László Nagy; Assistant referees: Mihály Tóth, Krisztián Szigeti dr.
Note: • Hajdúszoboszló: Sávolt (Bánhegyi (substituted on) 75') — Kónya (Mezei (substituted on) 63'), Potor, Butor (B. Kovács (substituted on) 75'), L. Tóth, Sallai (Fábián (substituted on) 75'), Bordán (Karika (substituted on) 63'), Gomes, Szathmári (Békési (substituted on) 46'), Z. Éles, B. Bárány • Coach: László Szabó

16 May 2026 28	AG Hajdúszoboszló	2–0	BUSE (Berettyóújfalu)	Hajdúszoboszló
17:00 CEST	B. Bárány 44'; Karika (yellow card) 45'; L. Tóth 68'	Report	Csordás (yellow card) 13'; Békési (yellow card) 84'; Ertsey (yellow card) 90'	Stadium: Bocskai Sporttelep; Attendance: 120; Referee: Péter Szabó dr. Assistant referees: Máté Kalocsai, Bálint Hajdu
Note: • Hajdúszoboszló: Sávolt — Kónya, Butor (Pajzos (substituted on) 82'), L. Tóth (Fábián (substituted on) 71'), Sallai (Potor (substituted on) 46'), Szathmári, Mezei, Karika (Bordán (substituted on) 46'), Gomes (Z. Éles (substituted on) 71'), Pallagi, B. Bárány • Coach: László Szabó

24 May 2026 29	Létavértes	0–16	AG Hajdúszoboszló	Létavértes
17:00 CEST	Ágoston (yellow card) 35'	Report	Karika 2' (pen.); B. Bárány 11', 34', 45', 66', 74', 89'; L. Tóth 44', 59', 75', 80', 84', 86'; Gomes 53'; Pallagi 77' (pen.); B. Kovács 82'	Stadium: Létavértesi Sportcentrum; Attendance: 120; Referee: Liza Sovány; Assistant referees: Attila Kiss dr., András Petrás
Note: • Hajdúszoboszló: Sávolt — Kónya (Sinyi (substituted on) 46'), Potor (Pallagi (substituted on) 65'), Butor (Békési (substituted on) 46'), L. Tóth, Bordán (Sallai (substituted on) 46'), Szathmári (B. Kovács (substituted on) 46'), Mezei, Karika (Pajzos (substituted on) 65'), Gomes, B. Bárány • Coach: László Szabó

30 May 2026 30	AG Hajdúszoboszló	6–1	Sárréti DSK (Sárrétudvari)	Hajdúszoboszló
15:00 CEST	Danka 2' (o.g.); B. Bárány 15', 88'; Karika 41'; L. Tóth 74', 85' (pen.)	Report	T. Szabó (yellow card) 60'; Z. Németh 77'	Stadium: Bocskai Sporttelep; Attendance: 130; Referee: Olivér Major; Assistant referees: Balázs Hegedűs, Tamás Rácz
Note: • Hajdúszoboszló: Sávolt (Bánhegyi (substituted on) 69') — Kónya (Sinyi (substituted on) 46'), Butor, L. Tóth, Sallai, Szathmári (Bordán (substituted on) 46'), Z. Éles, Mezei, Karika, Pallagi (Potor (substituted on) 46'), B. Bárány • Coach: László Szabó

Source: MLSZ Adatbank

=== Magyar Kupa ===
==== First round ====
2 August 2025 1st	AG Hajdúszoboszló	1–5	Tiszafüred (NB III)	Hajdúszoboszló
16:30 CEST	M. Kovács 65'	Report	Szerencsi 8', 56'; Karmacsi (yellow card) 27'; M. Kovács 49'; Győri 54'; Ludmány 90'	Stadium: Bocskai Sporttelep; Referee: Bence Bujnóczki; Assistant referees: Balázs Elek, Ákos Horváth
Note: • Hajdúszoboszló: Domonkos — Kónya, Potor (M. Kovács (substituted on) 46'), L. Tóth (Karika (substituted on) 60'), Gomes, Szathmári (Potornai (substituted on) 85'), Sinyi, Bogár, Sallai (Békési (substituted on) 60'), Pallagi (Bordán (substituted on) 60'), Mezei • Coach: László Szabó

=== Vármegyei Kupa ===
In Hungarian football, the County Cup (Vármegyei Kupa) system is a competition series where county directorates under the control of the Hungarian Football Association (MLSZ) set the competition rules and organize the tournaments for the county's amateur teams.
Source: MLSZ Adatbank

3 September 2025 2nd	Hajdúdorog SE	0–4	AG Hajdúszoboszló	Hajdúdorog
17:00 CEST	Papp (yellow card) 29'; Mondok (yellow card) 40'; Sándor (yellow card) 59'; Percze (yellow card) 59'; Pogácsás (red card) 61'	Report	Bordán 44'; Butor (yellow card) 50' (goal) 66'; Fábián 73'; Karika 88'	Stadium: Sportpálya; Referee: Ádám Kovács; Assistant referees: László Nagy, János Papp
Note: • Hajdúszoboszló: Sávolt — M. Kovács (Fábián (substituted on) 72'), L. Tóth, Bordán (Karika (substituted on) 72'), Békési, Potornai (B. Kovács (substituted on) 72'), Sinyi (Szathmári (substituted on) 82'), Butor, Z. Éles, Sallai (Pallagi (substituted on) 72'), Mezei • Coach: László Szabó

17 September 2025 3rd	Hajdúsámson	3–1	AG Hajdúszoboszló	Hajdúsámson
15:30 CEST	Bartha 7'; Kanalas 46'; M. Éles (yellow card) 50'; Antwi-Agyei (yellow card) 63'; B. Tóth 73'; Kiss (yellow card) 84'; Erdős (yellow card) 88'	Report	Szathmári (yellow card) 46'; M. Kovács 53' (yellow card) 64'; Z. Éles (yellow card) 75'	Stadium: Sporttelep; Referee: Péter Szabó; Assistant referees: Zoltán Kovács, Zalán Török
Note: • Hajdúszoboszló: Domonkos — Kónya, Sallai (Mezei (substituted on) 58'), M. Kovács, Gomes, Bordán (Karika (substituted on) 46'), Békési (L. Tóth (substituted on) 46'), Szathmári (Sinyi (substituted on) 58'), Potornai (Z. Éles (substituted on) 46'), Butor, Bogár • Coach: László Szabó

== Statistics ==
As of match played 30 May 2026 (completed)

=== Appearances ===
The following 26 players made appearances for Hajdúszoboszlói SE's first team during the season.
The number shows the number of steps on the pitch (starting+substitute).
Includes all competitions for senior teams.
The gold color indicates the maximum appearances only in the competition in which the team has already played at least 2 matches.

No.	Pos.	Player	Megyei Bajnokság I (Domestic league)	Magyar Kupa (Domestic cup)	Vármegyei Kupa (County cup)	Season total	Ref.
1	GK	(Hungary) Zoltán Bánhegyi	5 (2+3)	0	0	5 (2+3)	
4	MF	(Hungary) Benedek Kovács	17 (1+16)	0	1 (0+1)	18 (1+17)	
6	MF	(Hungary) Csaba Kónya	28 (28+0)	1 (1+0)	1 (1+0)	30 (30+0)	
7	DF	(Hungary) Márk Máté Potor	30 (12+18)	1 (1+0)	0	31 (13+18)	
8	MF	(Hungary) Levente Butor	30 (23+7)	0	2 (2+0)	22 (25+7)	
8	FW	(Hungary) Martin Kovács	10 (1+9)	1 (0+1)	2 (2+0)	13 (3+10)	
9	FW	(Hungary) Lajos Tóth	27 (26+0)	1 (1+0)	2 (1+1)	30 (28+1)	
10	MF	(Hungary) Csaba Sallai	27 (17+10)	1 (1+0)	2 (2+0)	30 (20+10)	
11	FW	(Hungary) Attila Bordán	27 (6+21)	1 (0+1)	2 (2+0)	30 (8+22)	
14	MF	(Hungary) Patrik Békési	9 (0+9)	1 (0+1)	2 (2+0)	12 (2+10)	
14	MF	(Hungary) Albert Pajzos	2 (0+2)	0	0	2 (0+2)	
16	MF	(Hungary) Zsolt Szathmári (c)	28 (26+2)	1 (1+0)	2 (1+1)	31 (28+3)	
17	MF	(Hungary) Ádám Potornai	6 (1+5)	1 (0+1)	2 (2+0)	9 (3+6)	
17	MF	(Hungary) Dominik Rácsai	1 (0+1)	0	0	1 (0+1)	
19	MF	(Hungary) Patrik Fábián	10 (0+10)	0	1 (0+1)	11 (0+11)	
23	MF	(Hungary) Zoltán Éles	24 (20+4)	0	2 (1+1)	26 (21+5)	
25	GK	(Hungary) Dávid Domonkos	15 (14+1)	1 (1+0)	1 (1+0)	17 (16+1)	
33	DF	(Hungary) Balázs Mezei	30 (28+2)	1 (1+0)	2 (1+1)	33 (30+3)	
33	DF	(Hungary) Márk Bogár	7 (6+1)	1 (1+0)	1 (1+0)	9 (8+1)	
39	FW	(Hungary) Balázs Karika	27 (25+2)	1 (0+1)	2 (0+2)	30 (25+5)	
66	MF	(Hungary) Tamás Sinyi	27 (23+4)	1 (1+0)	2 (1+1)	30 (25+5)	
69	MF	(Hungary) Roberto Gomes Schneider	27 (12+15)	1 (1+0)	1 (1+0)	29 (14+15)	
77	DF	(Hungary) János Pallagi	28 (23+5)	1 (1+0)	1 (0+1)	30 (24+6)	
89	GK	(Hungary) Levente Király	1 (0+1)	0	0	1 (0+1)	
89	GK	(Hungary) Ákos Sávolt	18 (14+4)	0	1 (1+0)	19 (15+4)	
91	FW	(Hungary) Bogát Bárány	24 (21+3)	0	0	24 (21+3)	

=== Goal scorers ===
Includes all competitions for senior teams. The list is sorted by squad number when season-total goals are equal. Players with no goals not included in the list.
We indicate in parentheses how many of the goals scored by the player from penalties.

Rk.	Pos.	No.	Player	Megyei Bajnokság I (Domestic league)	Magyar Kupa (Domestic cup)	Vármegyei Kupa (County cup)	Season total	Ref.
1	FW	9	(Hungary) Lajos Tóth	32 (5)	0	0	32 (5)	
2	FW	91	(Hungary) Bogát Bárány	26	0	0	26	
3	FW	39	(Hungary) Balázs Karika	14 (1)	0	1	15 (1)	
4	MF	6	(Hungary) Csaba Kónya	12 (4)	0	0	12 (4)	
5	FW	11	(Hungary) Attila Bordán	5	0	1	6	
6	DF	7	(Hungary) Márk Máté Potor	5	0	0	5	
6	MF	23	(Hungary) Zoltán Éles	5	0	0	5	
8	MF	22	(Hungary) Levente Butor	3	0	1	4	
8	MF	70	(Hungary) Csaba Sallai	4	0	0	4	
10	FW	8	(Hungary) Martin Kovács	1	1	1	3	
10	MF	19	(Hungary) Patrik Fábián	2	0	1	3	
10	MF	20	(Hungary) Tamás Sinyi	3	0	0	3	
13	MF	4	(Hungary) Benedek Kovács	2	0	0	2	
13	DF	91	(Hungary) Balázs Mezei	2	0	0	2	
15	MF	13	(Hungary) Roberto Gomes Schneider	1	0	0	1	
15	MF	16	(Hungary) Zsolt Szathmári (c)	1	0	0	1	
15	DF	77	(Hungary) János Pallagi	1 (1)	0	0	1 (1)	
—N/a			own goal by opponent	3	0	0	3	—
Total				122 (11)	1	5	128 (11)	

=== Penalties ===
Date	Penalty Taker	Scored	Opponent	Competition
30 August 2025	Lajos Tóth	Yes	DEAC II (A)	Megyei Bajnokság I, Round 4
13 September 2025	Lajos Tóth	Yes	Bocskai (Vámospércs) (A)	Megyei Bajnokság I, Round 6
13 September 2025	Lajos Tóth	Yes	Bocskai (Vámospércs) (A)	Megyei Bajnokság I, Round 6
12 October 2025	Csaba Kónya	Yes	Hajdúnánás (A)	Megyei Bajnokság I, Round 10
17 October 2025	Lajos Tóth	Yes	Nyíradony (H)	Megyei Bajnokság I, Round 11
14 March 2026	Csaba Kónya	Yes	DEAC II (H)	Megyei Bajnokság I, Round 19
4 April 2026	Csaba Kónya	Yes	Hajdúsámson (H)	Megyei Bajnokság I, Round 22
25 April 2026	Csaba Kónya	Yes	Hajdúnánás (H)	Megyei Bajnokság I, Round 25
24 May 2026	Balázs Karika	Yes	Létavértes (A)	Megyei Bajnokság I, Round 29
24 May 2026	János Pallagi	Yes	Létavértes (A)	Megyei Bajnokság I, Round 29
30 May 2026	Lajos Tóth	Yes	Sárrétudvari (H)	Megyei Bajnokság I, Round 30

Note

(H) – Home; (A) – Away

=== Clean Sheets ===
Includes all competitions for senior teams. The list is sorted by squad number when season-total clean sheets are equal. Numbers in parentheses represent games where both goalkeepers participated and both kept a clean sheet; the number in parentheses is awarded to the goalkeeper who was substituted on, whilst a full clean sheet is awarded to the goalkeeper who was on the field at the start of play.

Rk.	No.	Goalkeeper	Megyei Bajnokság I (Domestic league)	Magyar Kupa (Domestic cup)	Vármegyei Kupa (County cup)	Season total
1	25	(Hungary) Dávid Domonkos	7/15	0/1	0/1	7/17
1	89	(Hungary) Ákos Sávolt	6/18	0/0	1/1	7/19
3	1	(Hungary) Zoltán Bánhegyi	1/5	0/0	0/0	1/5
Total			14	0	1	15

=== Hat-tricks ===
Player	Against	Result	Goals	Date	Competition	Ref.
Lajos Tóth	Bocskai (Vámospércs) (A)	8–1	36' (pen.), 70' (pen.), 79'	13 September 2025	Megyei Bajnokság I, Round 6	
Bogát Bárány	Nyíradony (H)	5–1	20', 51', 64'	17 October 2025	Megyei Bajnokság I, Round 11	
Lajos Tóth ^{6}	Létavértes (H)	18–1	22', 31', 53', 56', 89', 90'	8 November 2025	Megyei Bajnokság I, Round 14	
Tamás Sinyi	Létavértes (H)	18–1	7', 29', 71'	8 November 2025	Megyei Bajnokság I, Round 14	
Bogát Bárány	Létavértes (H)	18–1	34', 48', 70'	8 November 2025	Megyei Bajnokság I, Round 14	
Csaba Kónya	Balmazújváros (H)	4–3	6', 14', 71'	28 February 2026	Megyei Bajnokság I, Round 17	
Bogát Bárány	Hajdúböszörmény (A)	7–0	21', 62', 70'	9 May 2026	Megyei Bajnokság I, Round 27	
Bogát Bárány ^{6}	Létavértes (A)	16–0	11', 34', 45', 66', 74', 89'	24 May 2026	Megyei Bajnokság I, Round 29	
Lajos Tóth ^{6}	Létavértes (A)	16–0	44', 59', 75', 80', 84', 86'		Megyei Bajnokság I, Round 29	

Note

(H) – Home; (A) – Away
^{4} – player scored 4 goals; ^{5} – player scored 5 goals; ^{6} – player scored 6 goals

=== Disciplinary record ===
Includes all competitions for senior teams. The list is sorted by red cards, then yellow cards (and by squad number when total cards are equal). Players with no cards not included in the list.

No.	Pos.	Player	Megyei Bajnokság I (Domestic league)			Magyar Kupa (Domestic cup)			Vármegyei Kupa (County cup)			Season total		
No.	Pos.	Player	Yellow card	(yellow card) (yellow-red card)	Red card	Yellow card	(yellow card) (yellow-red card)	Red card	Yellow card	(yellow card) (yellow-red card)	Red card	Yellow card	(yellow card) (yellow-red card)	Red card
23	MF	(Hungary) Zoltán Éles	8	0	1	0	0	0	1	0	0	9	0	1
18	DF	(Hungary) Martin Kovács	0	0	1	0	0	0	0	0	0	0	0	1
16	MF	(Hungary) Zsolt Szathmári (c)	7	0	0	0	0	0	1	0	0	8	0	0
20	MF	(Hungary) Tamás Sinyi	6	0	0	0	0	0	0	0	0	6	0	0
39	FW	(Hungary) Balázs Bence Karika	6	0	0	0	0	0	0	0	0	6	0	0
77	DF	(Hungary) János Pallagi	5	0	0	0	0	0	0	0	0	5	0	0
91	FW	(Hungary) Bogát Bárány	4	0	0	0	0	0	0	0	0	4	0	0
6	MF	(Hungary) Csaba Kónya	3	0	0	0	0	0	0	0	0	3	0	0
22	MF	(Hungary) Levente Butor	2	0	0	0	0	0	1	0	0	3	0	0
8	FW	(Hungary) Martin Kovács	1	0	0	0	0	0	1	0	0	2	0	0
9	FW	(Hungary) Lajos Tóth	2	0	0	0	0	0	0	0	0	2	0	0
4	MF	(Hungary) Benedek Kovács	1	0	0	0	0	0	0	0	0	1	0	0
7	DF	(Hungary) Márk Máté Potor	1	0	0	0	0	0	0	0	0	1	0	0
10	MF	(Hungary) Csaba Sallai	1	0	0	0	0	0	0	0	0	1	0	0
11	FW	(Hungary) Attila Bordán	1	0	0	0	0	0	0	0	0	1	0	0
13	DF	(Hungary) Balázs Mezei	1	0	0	0	0	0	0	0	0	1	0	0
14	MF	(Hungary) Patrik Békési	1	0	0	0	0	0	0	0	0	1	0	0
19	MF	(Hungary) Patrik Fábián	1	0	0	0	0	0	0	0	0	1	0	0
Total			51	0	2	0	0	0	4	0	0	55	0	2

== See also ==
- List of Hajdúszoboszlói SE seasons
