= Józsa (name) =

Józsa (also Jozsa) is a Hungarian name. It originates as a diminutive of József. It is most commonly found as a surname but is occasionally used as a female given name or male diminutive.

Notable people with the name include:

== Surname ==
- Dezsőné Józsa (née Ilona Szikora; 1918–unknown), Hungarian athlete
- Gábor Józsa (born 1983), Hungarian long-distance runner
- Imre Józsa (1954–2016), Hungarian actor and voice actor
- István Józsa (born 1953), Hungarian engineer and politician
- Jason Jozsa (born 1981), Canadian hockey player
- Károly Józsa (né Károly Albert Jakobovits; 1872–1929), Hungarian designer, engraver, and illustrator
- Ladislav Józsa (1948–1999), Hungarian footballer
- Levente Józsa (born 2002), Hungarian taekwondo practitioner
- Richard Jozsa (born 1953), Australian mathematician

== Given name ==
- Jozsa Berc (born 1944), a.k.a. Jože Berc, Slovenian rower
- Józsa Lángos (1911–1987), Hungarian chess player
