= Józsa =

Józsa (also Jozsa) may refer to:

- Deutsch–Jozsa algorithm, a quantum algorithm
- Gisin–Hughston–Jozsa–Wootters theorem, a concept in quantum information theory
- Józsa (name)
