= Jason Jozsa =

Canadian ice hockey player

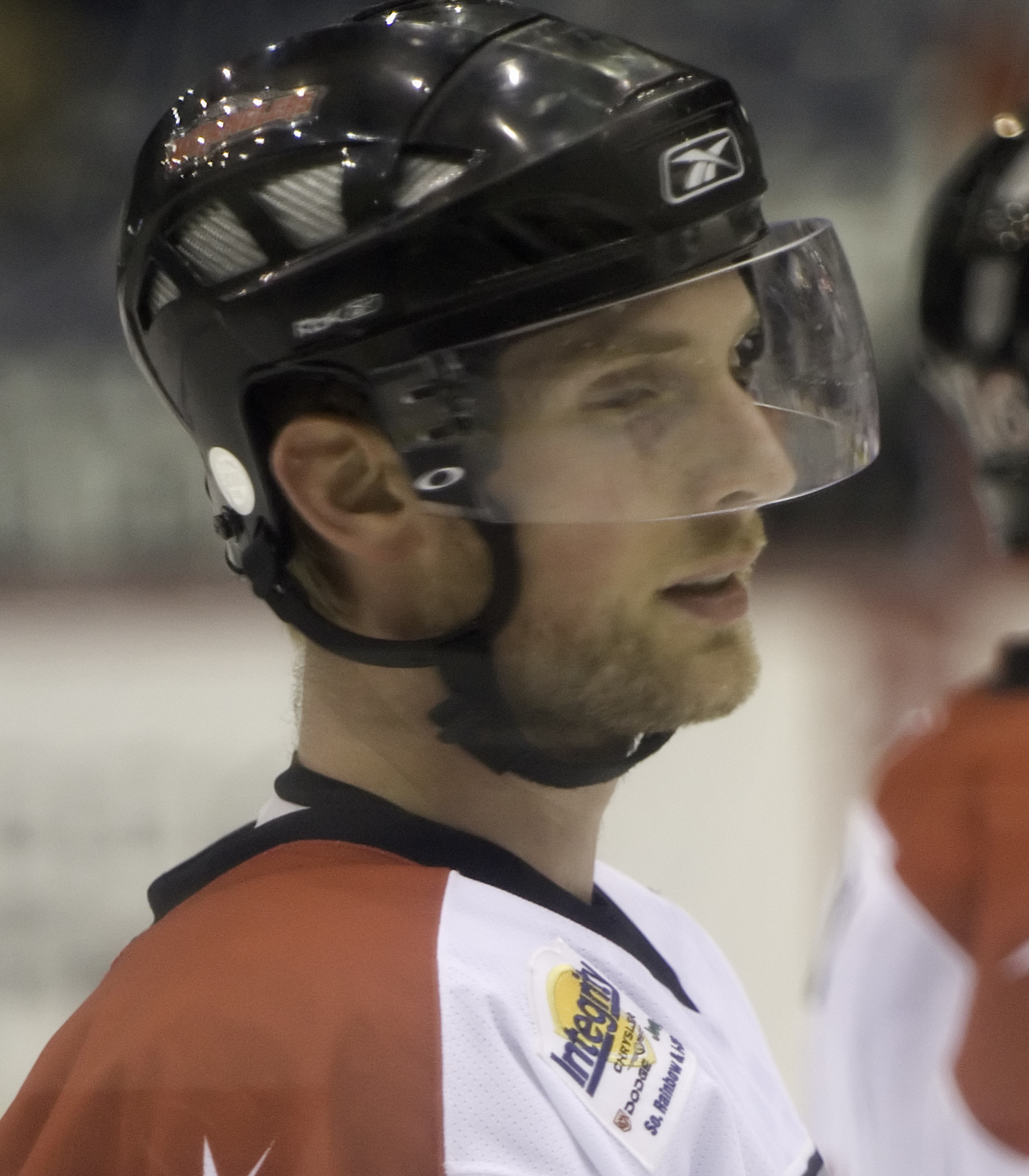
- Jozsa playing with the Las Vegas Wranglers in 2007
- Born: July 4, 1981 (age 43); Calgary, Alberta, Canada
- Height: 6 ft 1 in (185 cm)
- Weight: 190 lb (86 kg; 13 st 8 lb)
- Position: Defence
- Shot: Left
- Played for: AHL; Omaha Ak-Sar-Ben Knights; Quad City Flames; Grand Rapids Griffins; Milwaukee Admirals; ECHL; Toledo Storm; Greenville Grrrowl; Las Vegas Wranglers; Cincinnati Cyclones
- NHL draft: Undrafted
- Playing career: 2003–2010

Jason Jozsa (born July 4, 1981) is a Canadian retired professional ice hockey defenceman.

Following four seasons (1999–2003) of NCAA hockey with the Colorado College Tigers, Jozsa turned professional with the 2003–04 season playing his rookie year with the Toledo Storm of the ECHL. During the 2007–08 campaign, Jozsa helped the ECHL's Las Vegas Wranglers reach the Kelly Cup Finals, and in 2009–10 he won the Kelly Cup as a member of the Cincinnati Cyclones.

Jozsa retired after the 2009–10 season, having skated in 371 ECHL games and 92 American Hockey League games over seven seasons of play.
