= Hajdúszoboszlói SE =

Hungarian football club

- Full name: Hajdúszoboszlói Sportegyesület
- Founded: 1912; 114 years ago
- Ground: Bocskai Stadion
- League: MB I Hajdú-Bihar
- 2025–26: Megyei Bajnokság I Hajdú-Bihar, 2nd of 16
Home colours	Away colours

Hajdúszoboszlói Sportegyesület is an amateur football club based in Hajdúszoboszló, Hajdú-Bihar, Hungary.

== Divisions ==
The parent multisport club Hajdúszoboszlói SE divisions include men's football, archery, athletics, basketball, boxing, chess, darts, shooting, squash, tennis and water polo teams.

== History ==
The club were promoted Nemzeti Bajnokság III after winning Hajdú-Bihar county championship in 2020–21. However, on 6 June 2023, the team withdrew from the league before the next season due to financial reasons, after two years of competing.

== First team squad ==
As of 21 August 2025

Note: Flags indicate national team as defined under FIFA eligibility rules; some limited exceptions apply. Players may hold more than one non-FIFA nationality.

No.	Pos.	Nation	Player
6	MF	HUN	Csaba Kónya
7	DF	HUN	Márk Máté Potor
8	FW	HUN	Martin Alex Kovács
9	FW	HUN	Lajos András Tóth
10	DF	HUN	Roberto Gomes Schneider
11	FW	HUN	Attila Bordán
14	MF	HUN	Patrik Békési
16	MF	HUN	Zsolt Szathmári (captain)
17	MF	HUN	Ádám Bálint Potornai
18	DF	HUN	Márk Bogár

No.	Pos.	Nation	Player
20	MF	HUN	Tamás Sinyi
22	MF	HUN	Levente Csaba Butor
23	MF	HUN	Zoltán Éles
25	GK	HUN	Dávid Domonkos
33	DF	HUN	Márk Bogár
39	FW	HUN	Balázs Bence Karika
70	MF	HUN	Csaba Sallai
77	DF	HUN	János Pallagi
89	GK	HUN	Ákos Péter Sávolt
91	DF	HUN	Balázs Mezei

== Season results ==
As of 4 October 2025.

Domestic														Manager	Ref.
League												Cup		Manager	Ref.
No.	Season	Div.	MP	W	D	L	GF–GA	Dif.	Pts.	Win%	Pos.	Magyar Kupa	County Cup	Manager	Ref.
76	2018–19	MB I (Hajdú-Bihar)	30	14	3	13	83–56	+27	45	46.67	6 of 16	DNQ	Second round	N/A	
77	2019–20	MB I (Hajdú-Bihar)^{1}	18	14	2	2	56–10	+46	44	77.77	2 of 16	R6 (First round)	Third round^{1}	N/A	
78	2020–21	MB I (Hajdú-Bihar)	30	28	1	1	174–15	+157	85	93.33	1 of 16 ↑	DNQ	First round	N/A	
79	2021–22	NB III (East group)	38	20	10	8	74–39	+35	70	52.63	4 of 20	First round	—	N/A	
80	2022–23	NB III (East group)	38	12	10	16	45–50	-5	46	31.58	17 of 20 ↓	First round	—	N/A	
81	2023–24	MB I (Hajdú-Bihar)	26	17	3	6	91–25	+66	54	65.28	3 of 14	First round	Second round	N/A	
82	2024–25	MB I (Hajdú-Bihar)	30	23	3	4	91–26	+65	72	76.67	2 of 16	DNQ	Winner	(Hungary) László Szabó	
83	2025–26	MB I (Hajdú-Bihar)	9	7	0	2	26–7	+19	21	77.77	2 of 16	First round	Second round	(Hungary) László Szabó	

Notes

- DNQ – Did not qualify;
- Note 1: The season was suspended due to the COVID-19 pandemic.
