= Bocskai Stadion =

Football stadium in Hajdúszoboszló, Hajdú-Bihar, Hungary

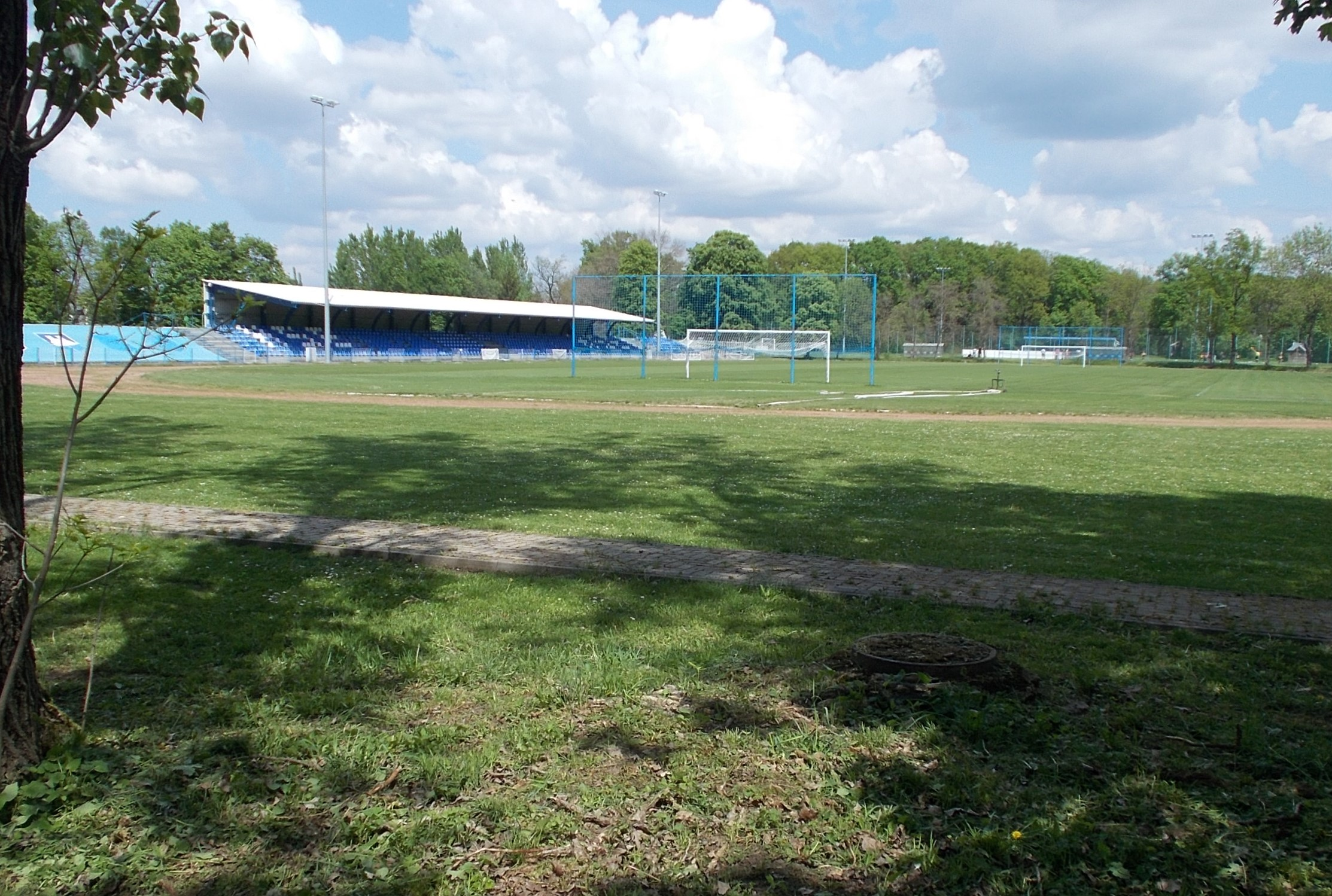
- Bocskai Stadion in 2025
- Interactive map of Bocskai Stadion
- Full name: Bocskai Stadion
- Location: Hajdúszoboszló, Hungary
- Coordinates: 47.4529°N 21.4085°E
- Owner: Hajdúszoboszlói SE
- Capacity: 2,000 (700 spectators were covered)
- Surface: Grass; Field
- Field size: 108 m × 62 m (354 ft × 203 ft)

Construction
- Groundbreaking: 1966
- Built: 1966–68
- Opened: 1968
- Renovated: 2023

Tenant
- Hajdúszoboszlói SE

Bocskai Stadion is a multi-use stadium in Hajdúszoboszló, Hungary. It is currently used mostly for football matches and is the home stadium of Hajdúszoboszlói SE. The stadium is able to hold 2,500 people.

== History ==
=== The beginnings and relocation ===
Although the sports club was founded in 1912, the construction work on today's Sport Street base and stadium began in the mid-1960s.

=== 1968: Handover of the stadium ===
The foundations of the facility were laid in 1966, and the new sports complex was finally handed over to the athletes and the general public in 1968. At the same time, the club took the name Bocskai SE.

=== Golden age and class changes ===
The highest level of matches held in the stadium was the Nemzeti Bajnokság III (tier 3) and Megyei Bajnokság I (tier 4) championship seasons. The team fought several times for promotion to Nemzeti Bajnokság II (tier 2), which attracted a huge fan base to the stands.

=== 2015: Artificial Turf Pitch ===
The full-sized artificial turf football pitch at the Bocskai Stadium in Hajdúszoboszló was opened to athletes in August 2015. Construction work began in May 2015 on the site of the former Gázláng tennis court and the "Polish market." In addition to the playing field, the project included the installation of ball-stop fencing and floodlighting to facilitate evening training sessions and matches.

=== 2023: Modernization and renewal of the center field ===
The playing field, which had aged over the decades, was completely rebuilt in 2023. During the investment 1,650 cubic meters of earth were moved, 2,100 meters of drainage pipes were laid for drainage, and a modern, 35-head automatic irrigation system was built under the brand new turf.

== Features ==
=== Pitches ===
Main grass pitch with 2,000 seats (of which 700 spectators were covered) and 500 standing spaces. A floodlit artificial grass training pitch opened in 2015.

=== Facilities ===
Accessible entrance and parking, covered grandstand area, and running track.

== Gallery ==
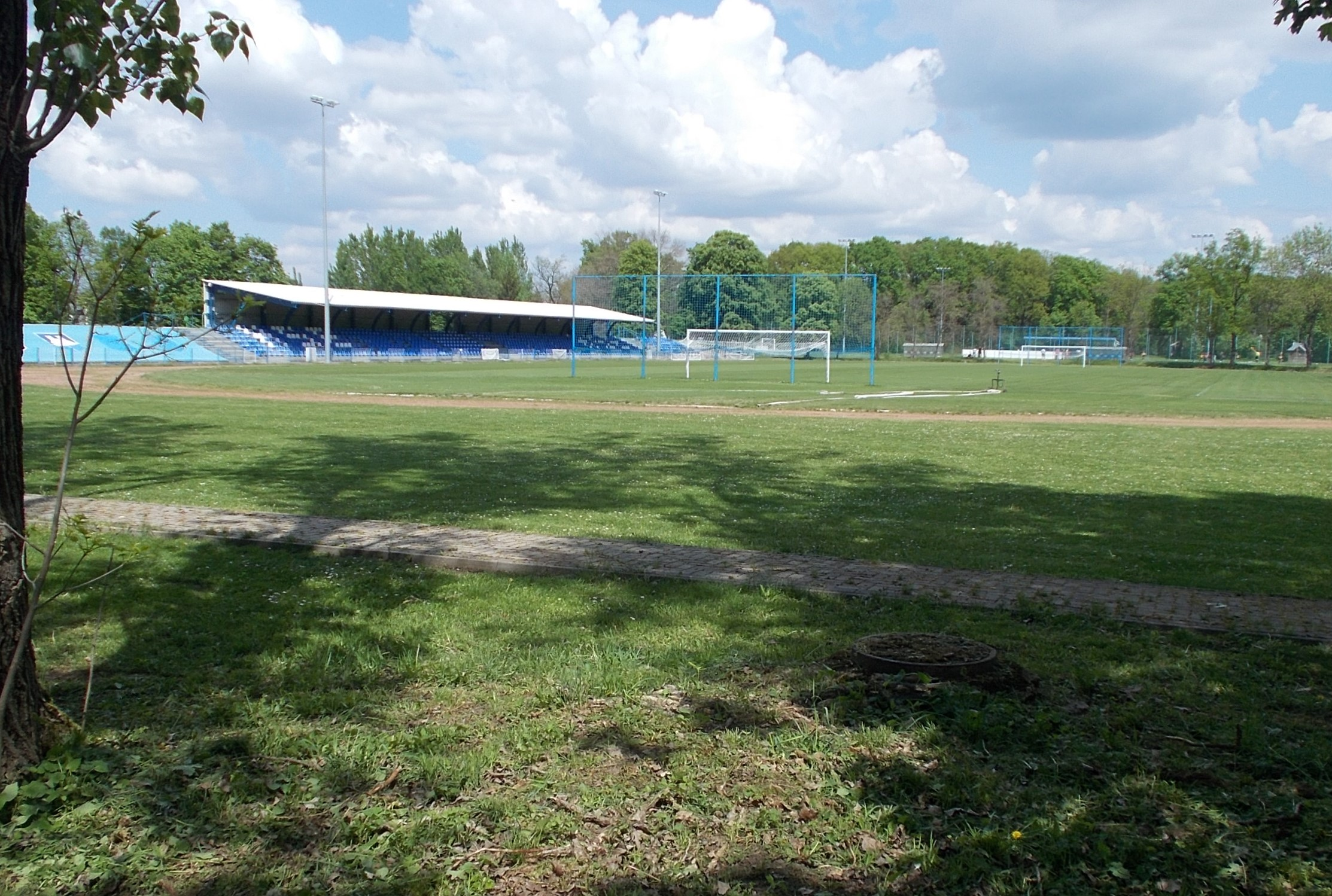
The stadium in 2025

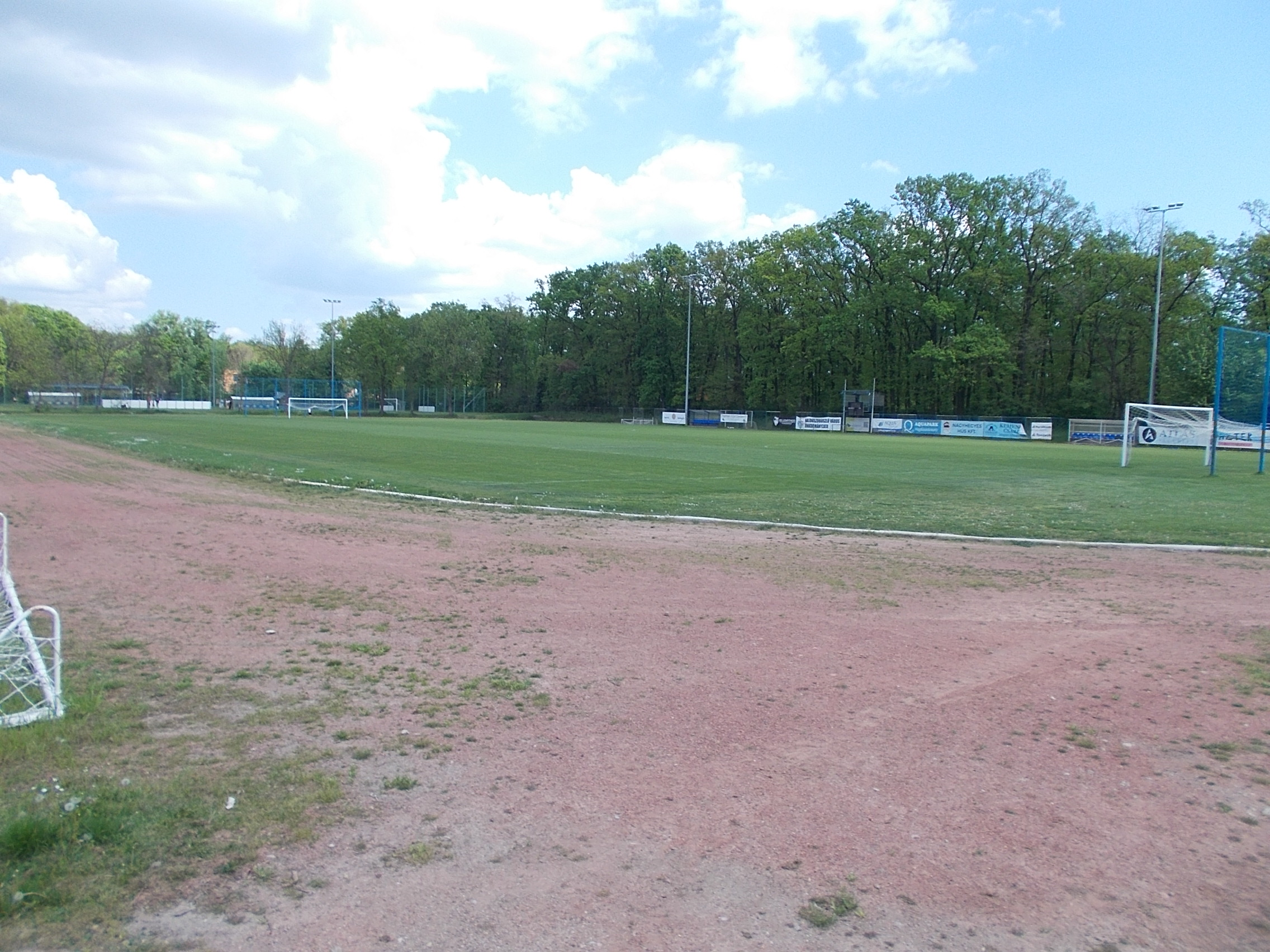
The stadium and the athletics track in 2025

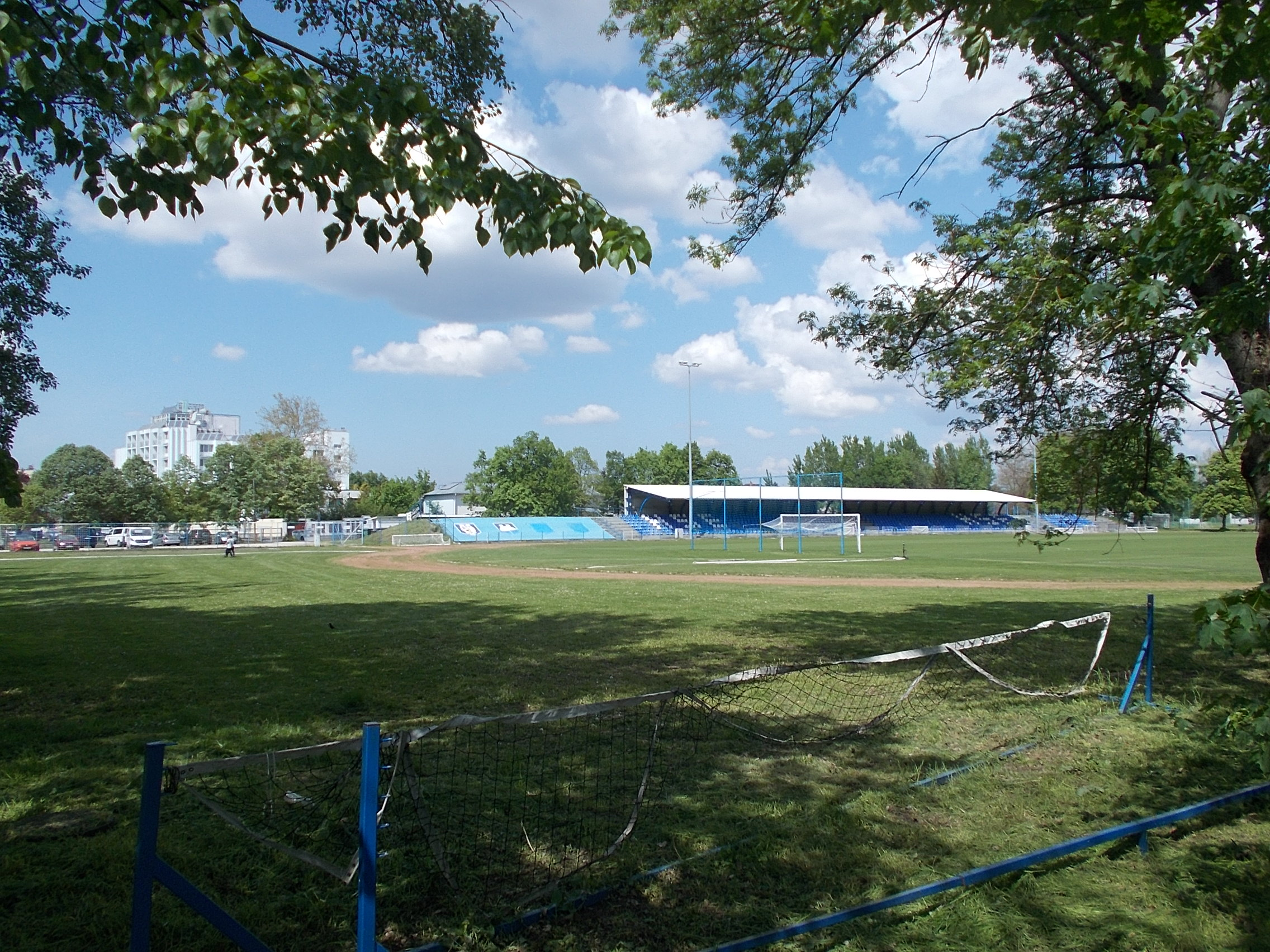
The stadium's covered stand in 2025

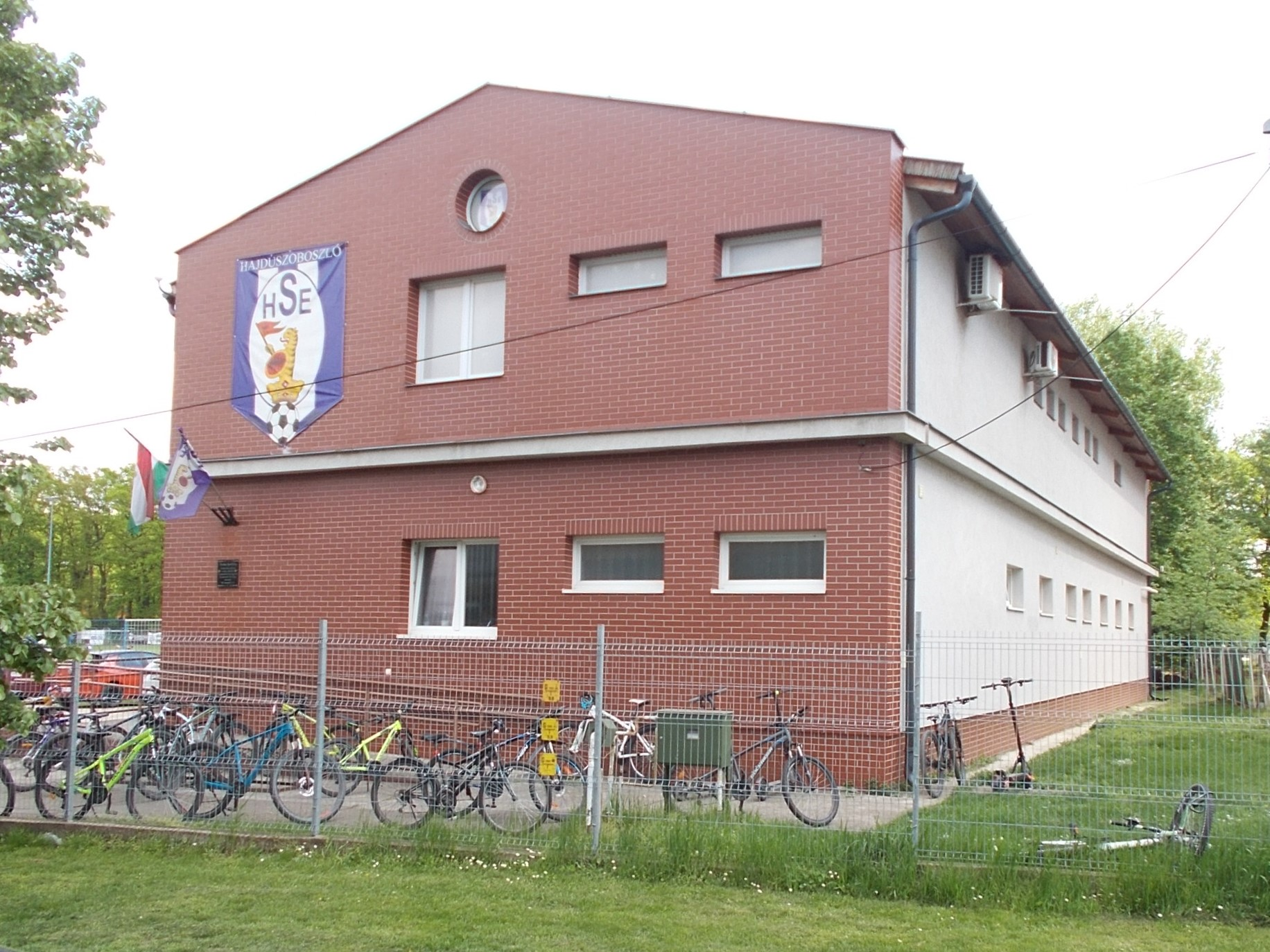
The main building where the offices and changing rooms are located in 2025

== See also ==
- Hajdúszoboszlói SE
- Hajdúszoboszló
