= Great Plain and North =

Great Plain and North Alföld és Észak
- Region
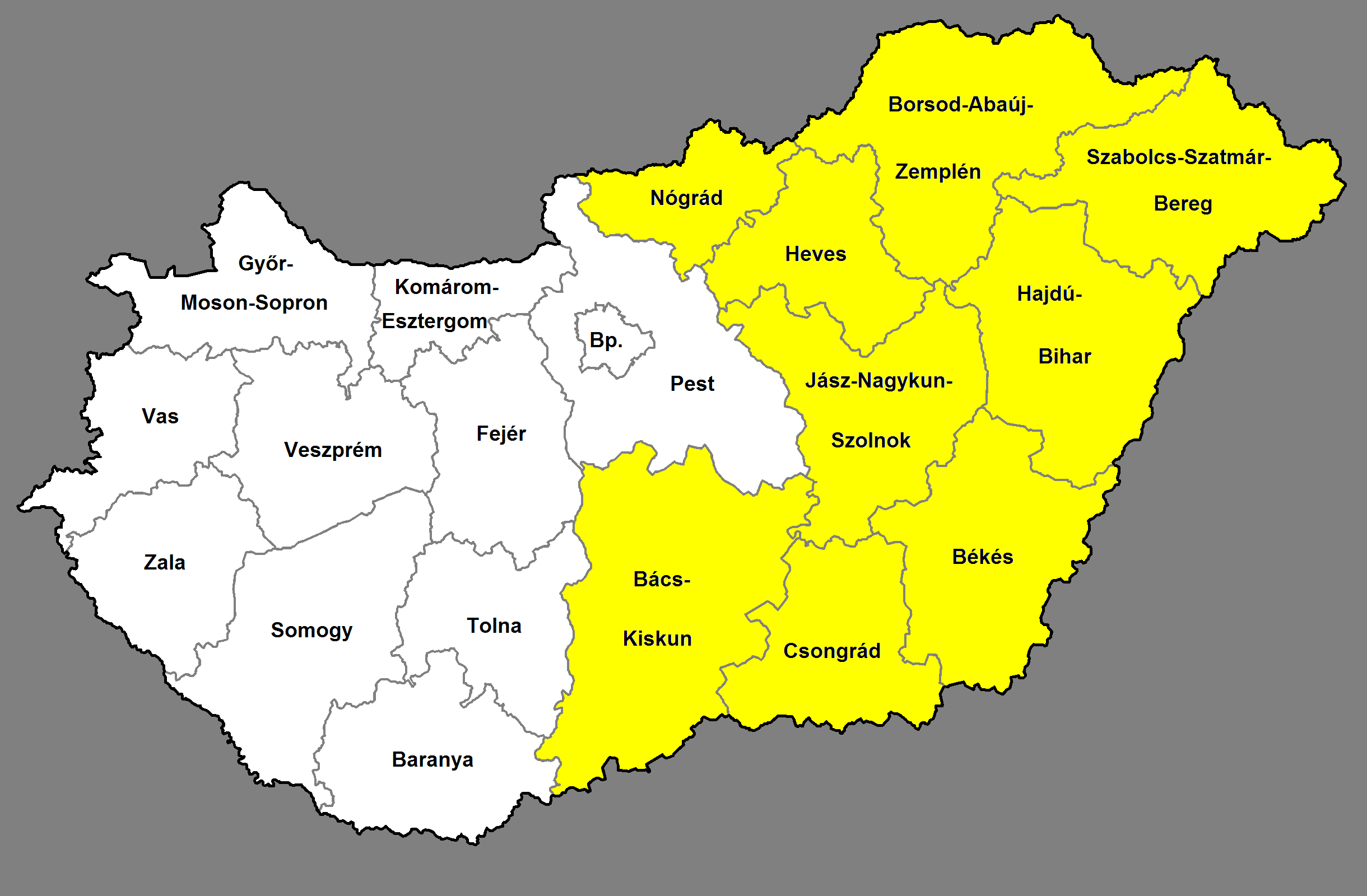
- Great Plain and North (NUTS 1) and its constituent counties (NUTS 3)
- Country: Hungary
- Capital city: Budapest

Area
  - Total: 49,485 km^{2} (19,106 sq mi)

Population (1 January 2025)
  - Total: 3,646,403
  - Density: 74/km^{2} (190/sq mi)
- Time zone: UTC+1 (CET)
  - Summer (DST): UTC+2 (CEST)
- NUTS code: HU3

Great Plain and North (Hungarian: Alföld és Észak) is a statistical (NUTS 1) region of Hungary. It comprises the NUTS 2 regions of Northern Hungary, Northern Great Plain, and Southern Great Plain.

The total population of the region is around 3,600,000 people in an area of 49,485 km^{2} (19,106 sq mi) (giving a population density of around 73.6870/km^{2} (190.8485/sq mi).

== Regions and counties ==
There are nine counties in Great Plain and North, which are in three statistical regions:

- Northern Hungary (HU31) (Borsod-Abaúj-Zemplén County, Heves County and Nógrád County)
- Northern Great Plain (HU32) (Hajdú-Bihar County, Jász-Nagykun-Szolnok County and Szabolcs-Szatmár-Bereg County)
- Southern Great Plain (HU33) (Bács-Kiskun County, Békés County and Csongrád County)

Northern Hungary and Northern Great Plain are often together called North-Eastern Hungary.

== Geography ==
Prominent landscape features are the North Hungarian Mountains and the Great Plain.

National Parks in the region include Bükk National Park and Hortobágy National Park.

== Tourism ==
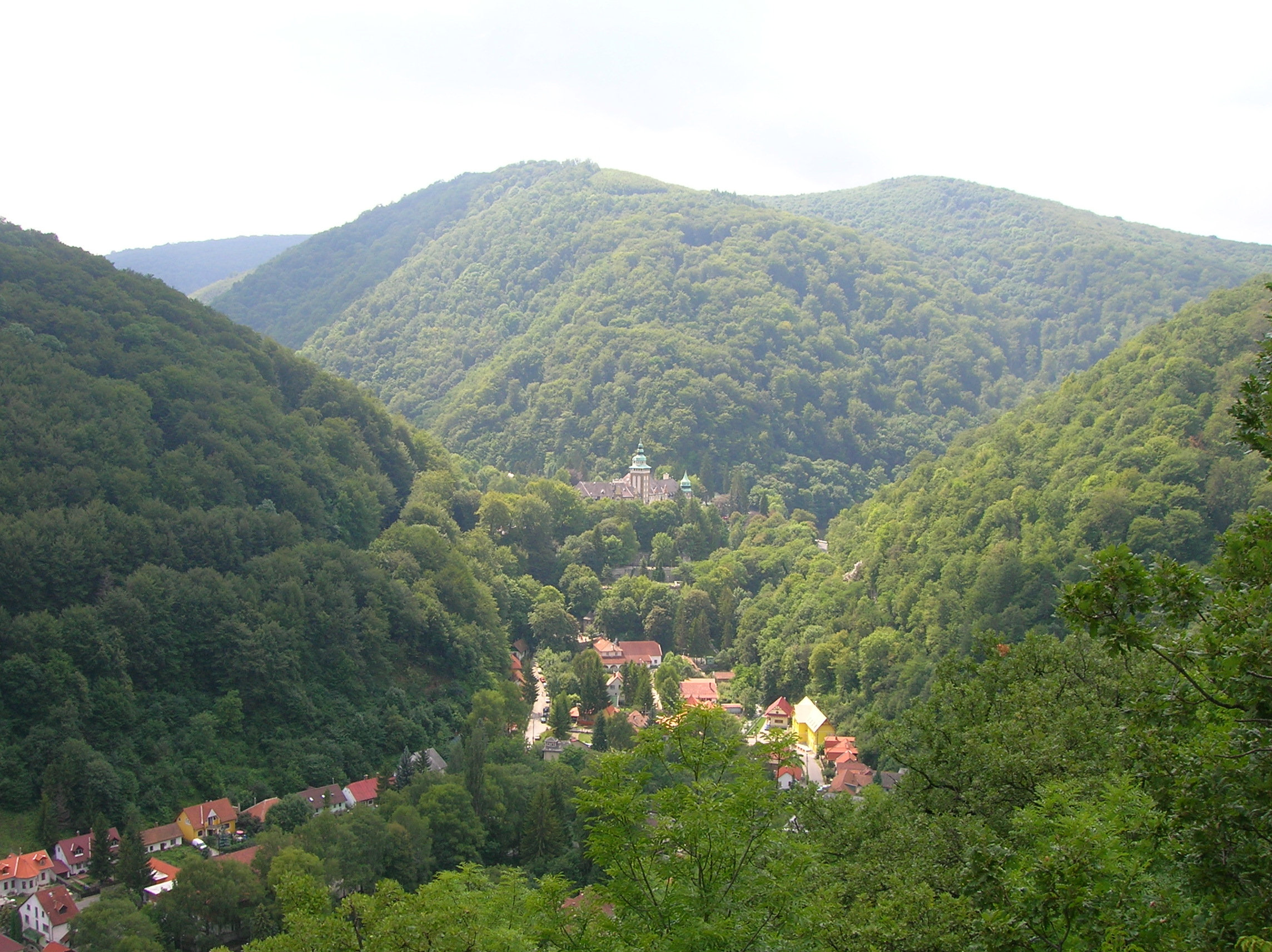
Lillafüred

There are four tourists regions in the Great Plain and North. The Lake Tisza and its surrounding is an exceptional region as it is not part of the NUTS.

The four regions are:

- Northern Hungary
- Northern Great Plain
- Lake Tisza
- Southern Great Plain

=== Landmarks by region ===
==== Northern Hungary ====
The most important tourist cities are Eger, Miskolc, Sárospatak, Pásztó, which are all famous for their wines and spas. Tokaj) and Hollókő form part of a World Heritage Site. There are many mediaeval castles and ruins of others, including Boldogkő Castle, Castle of Diósgyőr, Füzér Castle, Sárospatak Castle, Szerencs Castle, Szécsény Castle estates, and Hollókő Castle. The Mátra mountains and the Bükk mountains give plenty of opportunities for hiking, and there are areas of scenic countryside in Lillafüred and Aggtelek National Park. The caves in the Bükk have many stalagmites and stalactites.

==== Northern Great Plain ====
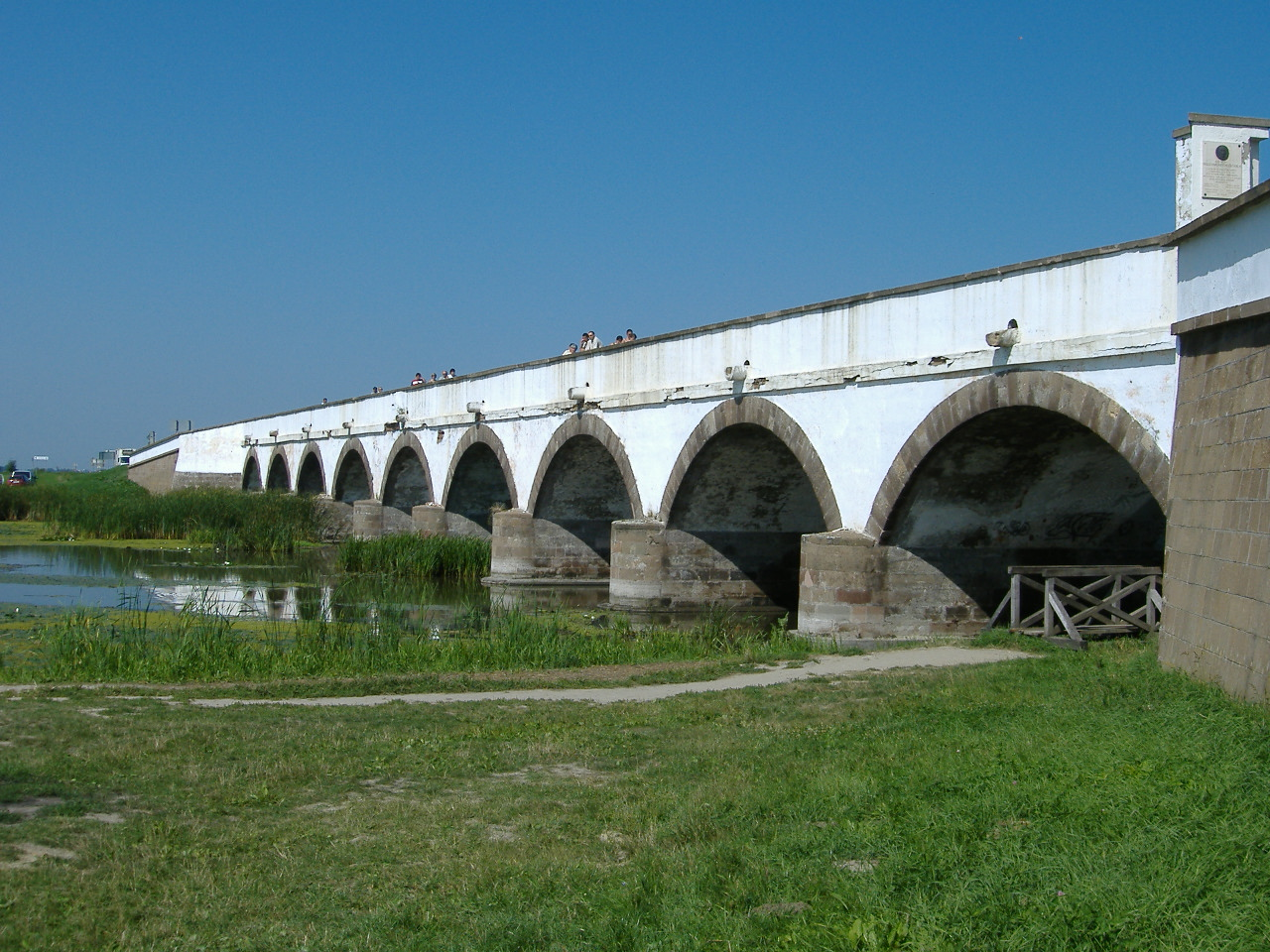
The nine-arched bridge at Hortobágy National Park

The most important tourist sites are the regional seat Debrecen with its ancient monuments, and Hortobágy National Park. Nyíregyháza and Nyírbátor both have intimate historic city centres. Nyíregyháza and its suburbs have some interesting sights, for example the open-air museum, safari park, and Nyírvidék children's railway. There are extraordinary churches in Csaroda and Tákos.

==== Southern Great Plain ====
Tourist sights in the area include the Great Plain itself, its landscape, farms, the traditions and the cities' monuments and museums, especially Szeged the regional seat, Gyula, Kecskemét, Kalocsa, Szentes, Hódmezővásárhely, and Baja. The region's most important landscapes include the Ópusztaszer National Heritage Park, Gyula Castle, the stud farm in Mezőhegyes and the wine cellars at Hajós. Other attractions include the Great Bustard Nature Reserve at Dévaványa, the Bugac Plain, and the Mártély National Park.

The most popular festival in the region is the Szeged Open Air Games, featuring historical reenactments and ancient sports such as archery.
