= Csikos (disambiguation) =

Csikós, the horseman of the Hungarian puszta

Csikos may also refer to:

- Csikos (surname)
- Csikos Post, a galop by Hermann Necke
- Csikós court, at Buda Castle
- A Csikós, a Hungarian film by Sándor Góth
