= Puszta =

Temperate grassland biome in Hungary

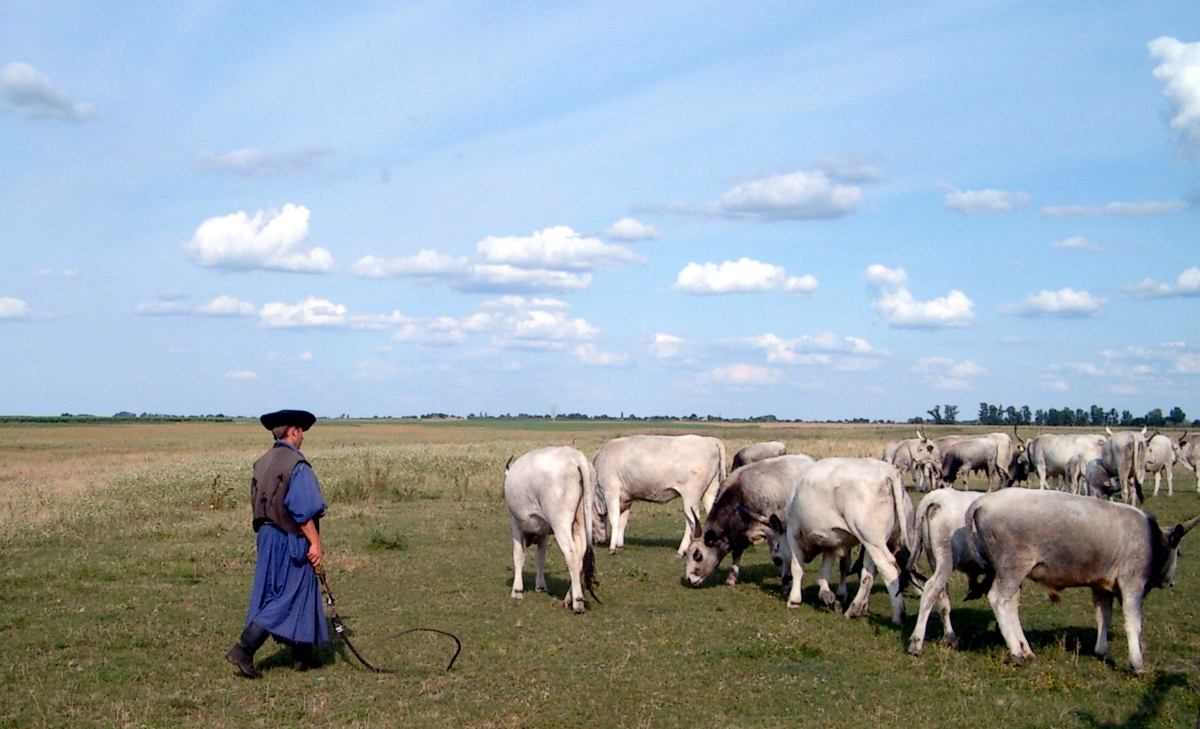

Ecology
- Realm: Eurasian Steppe
- Biome: temperate grassland

Geography
- Country: Hungary
- Coordinates: 47.5°N 21.1°E

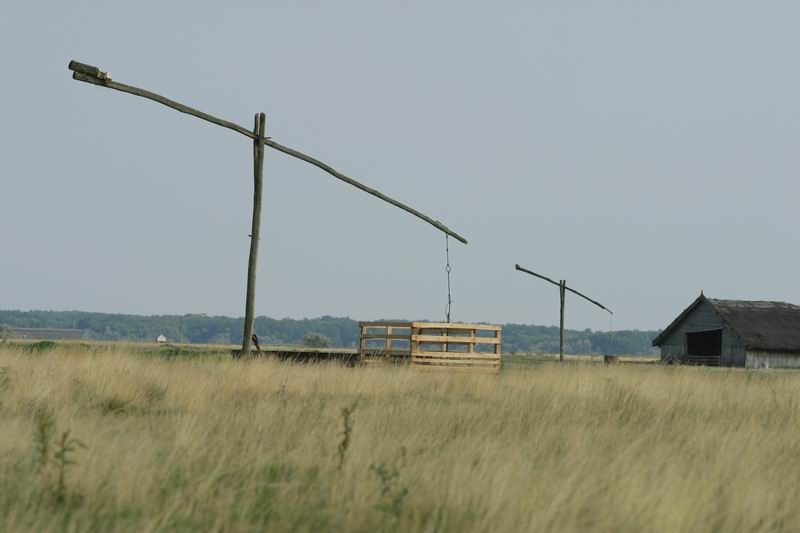
Typical draw well in the puszta in the Hortobágy National Park

The Hungarian puszta (Hungarian pronunciation: [ˈpustɒ]) is a temperate grassland biome of the Great Hungarian Plain. It is an exclave of the Pannonian Steppe, and lies mainly around the River Tisza in the eastern part of Hungary, as well as in the western part of the country and in the Burgenland of Austria.

It covers a total area of about 50,000 km^{2} (19,000 mi^{2}). The characteristic landscape is composed of treeless plains, saline steppes and salt lakes, and includes scattered sand dunes, low, wet forests and freshwater marshes along the floodplains of the ancient rivers. It is strongly associated with traditional Hungarian breeds of domestic animal including the Hungarian Grey breed of cattle, the Mangalitsa breed of woolly pig, the Nonius breed of horse and the Racka breed of horned sheep, and also with the traditions of the csikós mounted herdsmen.

== Name ==
The adjective puszta is of Slavic origin and means 'abandoned', 'bare', 'bleak', 'deserted' and 'uninhabited'.

== History ==
From the late Pleistocene era the landscape of the Alföld or Great Hungarian Plain consisted in large part of arid alkaline grasslands devoid of trees – the puszta. The extent of the puszta over much of the Alföld was drastically reduced by the extensive drainage and irrigation works carried out during the nineteenth century, and it survives principally in the Hortobágy National Park, established in 1972 in eastern Hungary and centred on the village of Hortobágy in Hajdú-Bihar County.

The Hortobágy National Park or the Puszta is a UNESCO World Heritage Site in Hungary.

== Climate ==
The climate is continental. Landscape is widely cultivated, the original Puszta landscape now being found only in a few places, for example in Hortobágy National Park.

== Agriculture ==
Most of Hungary's vegetable and grain crops are grown on the Great Plain. The region has a sandy soil and is sunny; the city of Szeged is often called City of Sunshine (Napfény városa). In addition to cattle, sheep, and pigs, the region also produces poultry and foie gras.

== Fauna ==
Three hundred species of birds are found here.
