= Csikos (surname) =

Csikós is a Hungarian surname literally meaning an occupation of csikós

- Emily Csikos (born 1988), Canadian water polo player
- Gábor Csikos (1939–1996), Hungarian actor in The Hunchback
- John Csikos, Canada men's national water polo team coach
- Luca Csíkos (born 2005), Hungarian handballer
- Mihály Csikós, a Hungarian sportsman participating in 1938 Wimbledon Championships - Men's Singles
- Rózsi Csikós (1917–1992), Hungarian stage and film actress
- Tibor Szalay Csikos (born 1938), Hungarian former football player
- Zsóka Csikós (born 2001), Hungarian canoeist

== See also ==
- Béla Csikos-Sessia, the Hungarian version name for Croatian painter Bela Čikoš Sesija
