= Csikós =

Traditional herder of horses in Hungary

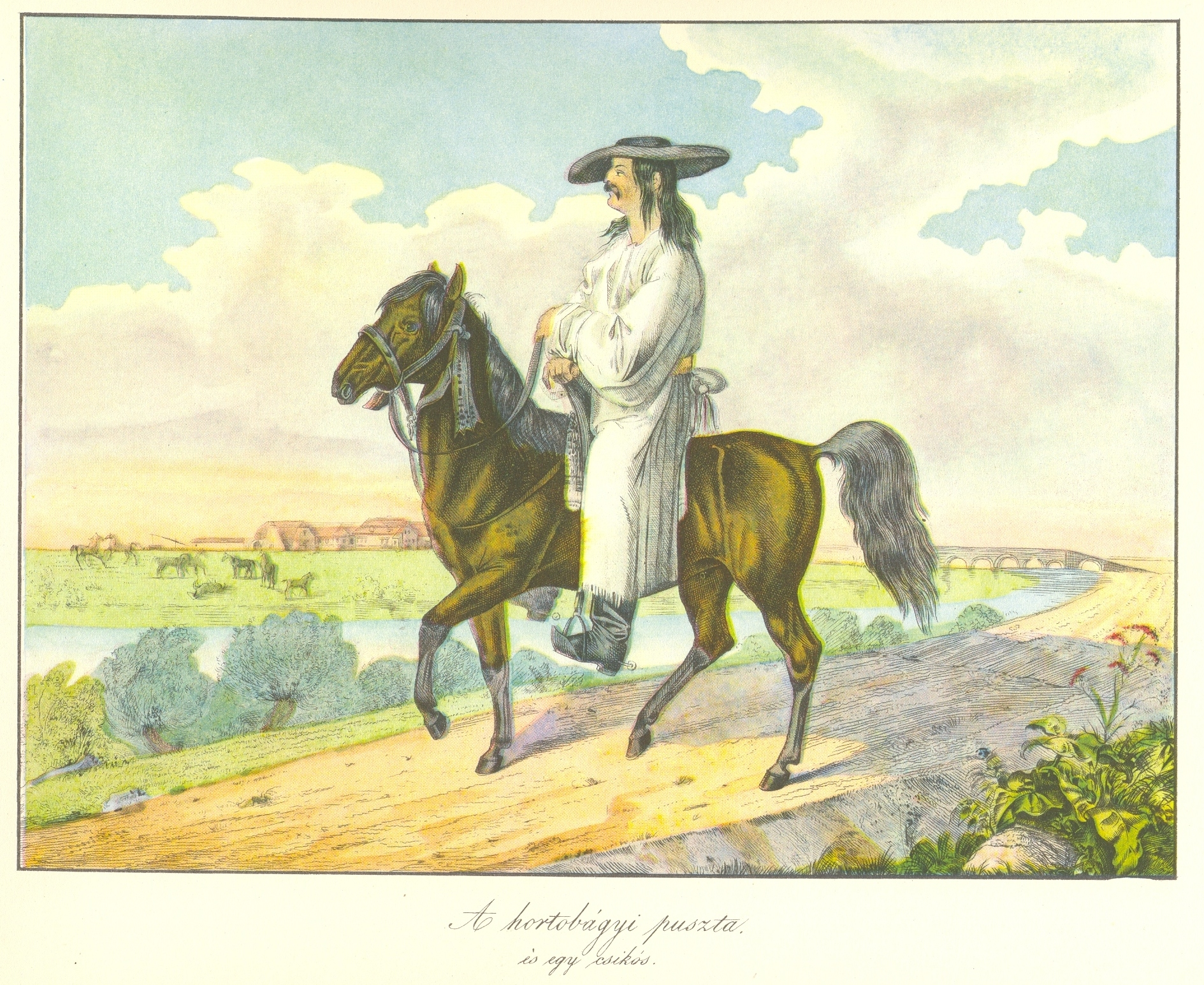
A csikós in the puszta of Hortobágy, 1846

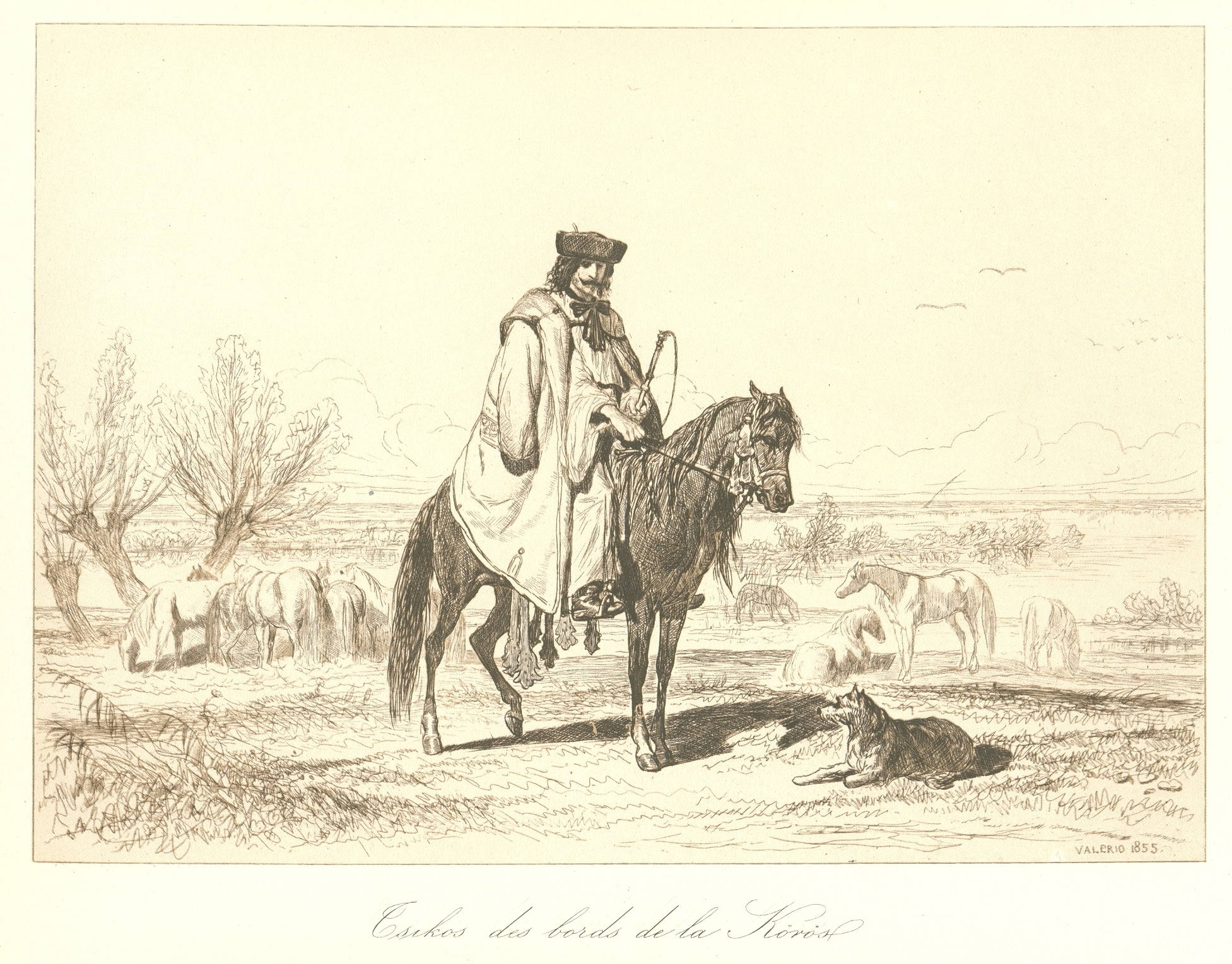
Csikós in the puszta near the Körös River, 1855

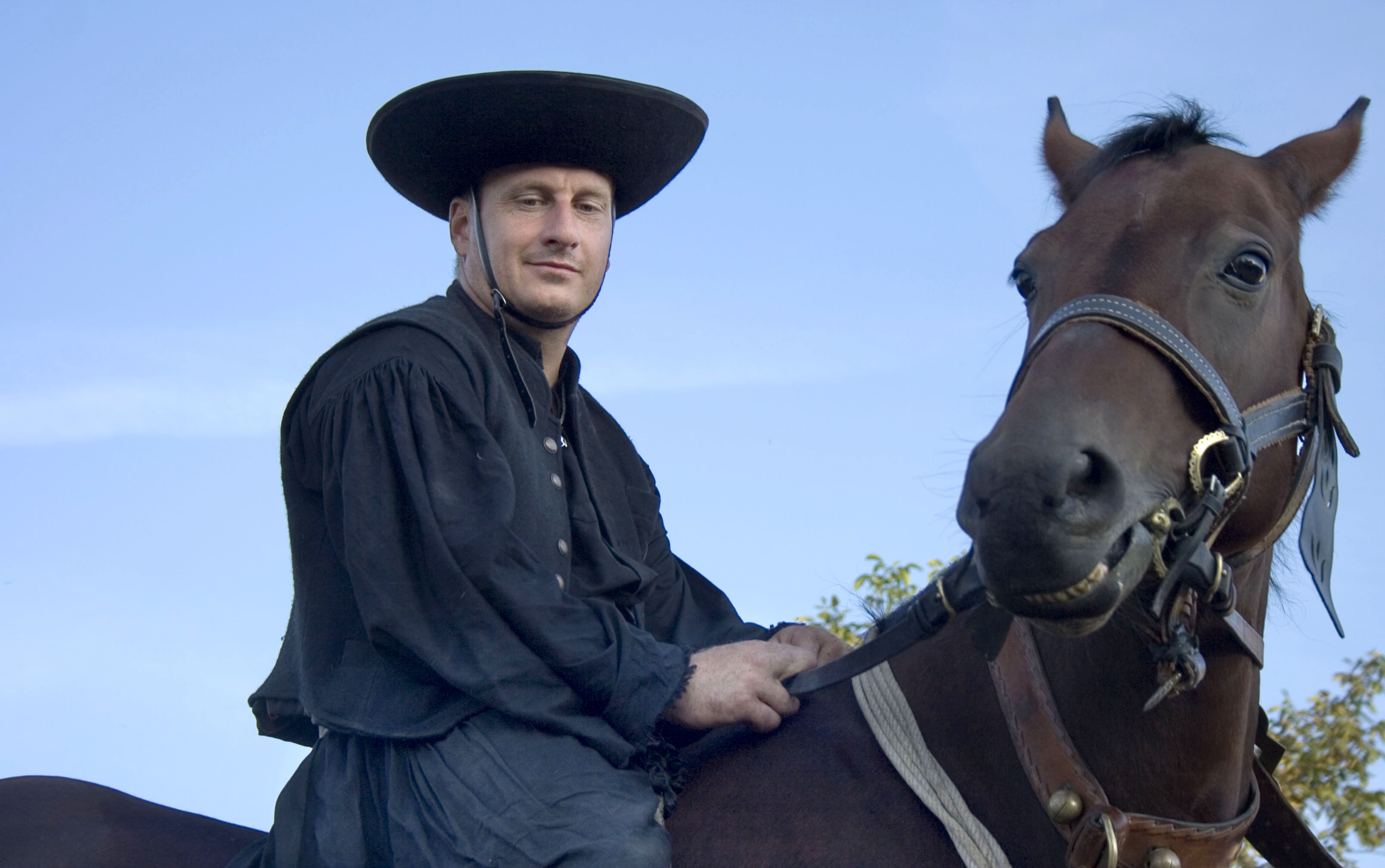
A modern-day csikós

The csikós (Hungarian pronunciation: [ˈt͡ʃikoːʃ], singular) is a horse-mounted herdsman of Hungary. The csikós tradition is closely associated with the Hungarian puszta, the temperate grasslands of the Great Hungarian Plain, which encompasses the largest stretches of the greater Pannonian Basin. In recent times, csikós have been particularly tied to the environs of Debrecen and Hortobágy National Park, the latter deploying csikós to watch over and maintain large herds of free-ranging native Hungarian ungulate breeds, including cattle, horses and sheep. The csikós tradition is also tied to the Nonius, a breed of horse with an epicentre of breeding in the Máta Stud, located some 3 kilometres from Hortobágy.

== Images ==
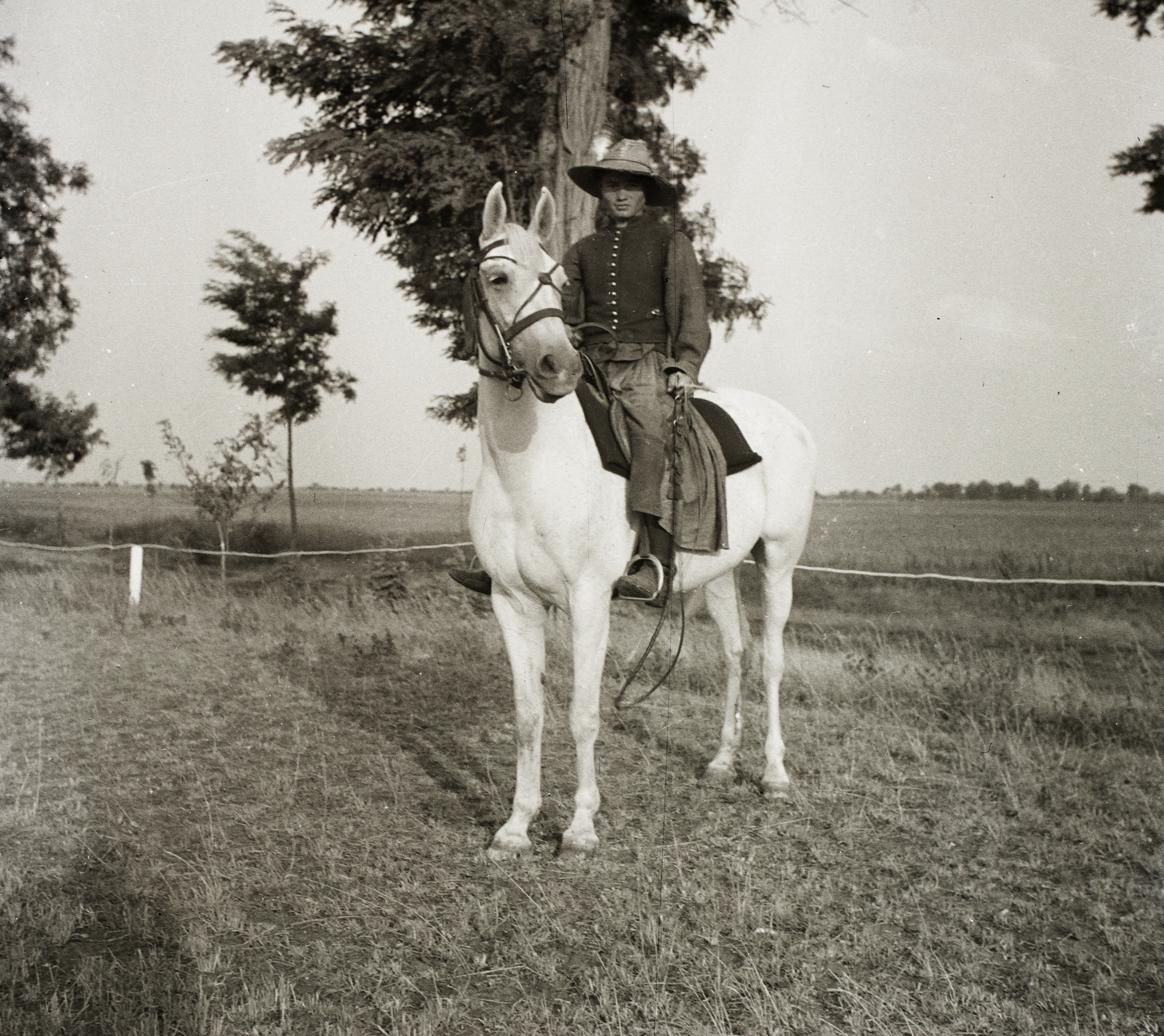
Csikós on a white horse, 1935

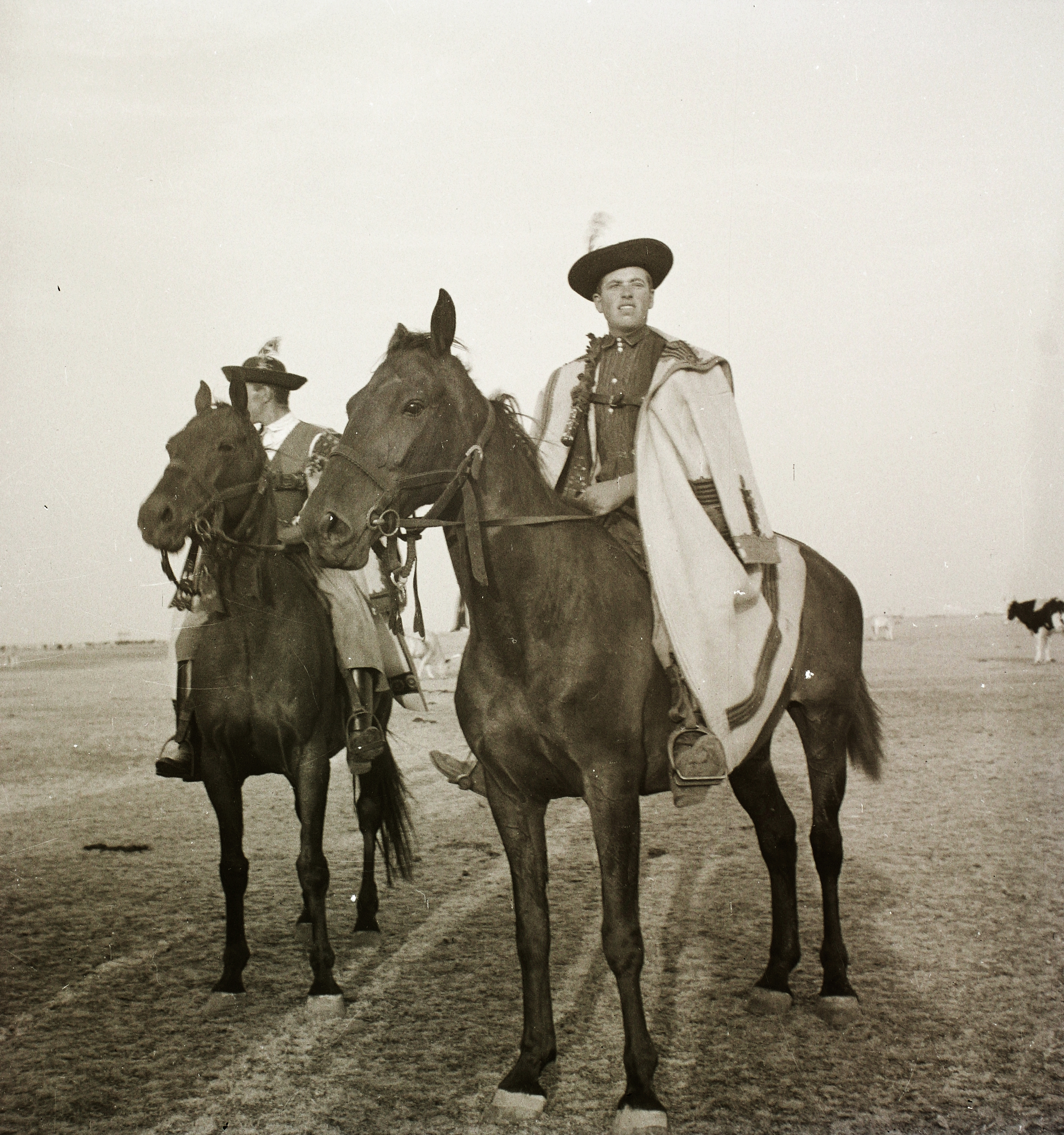
Csikós on bay horses, 1935
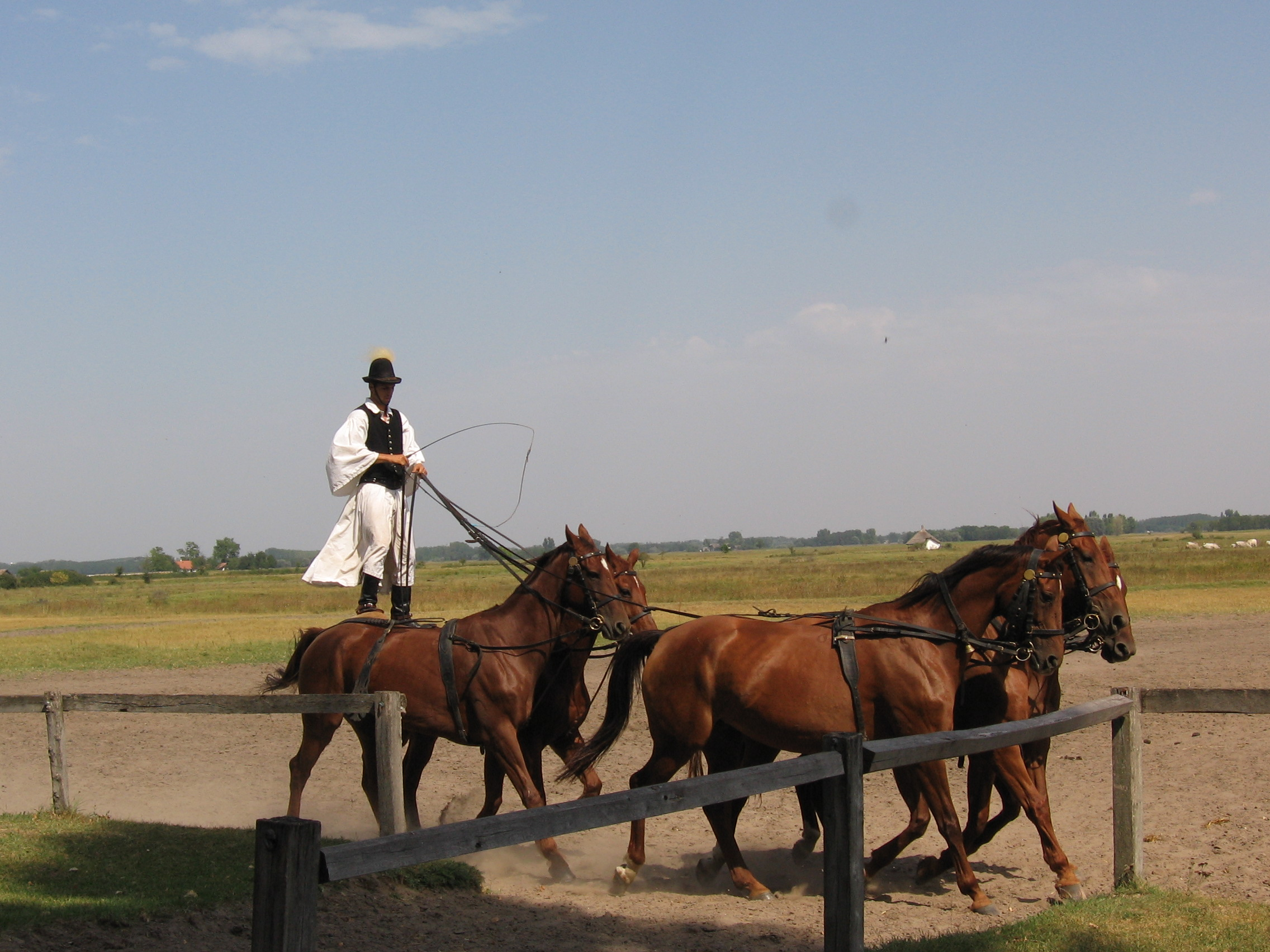
Hungarian post

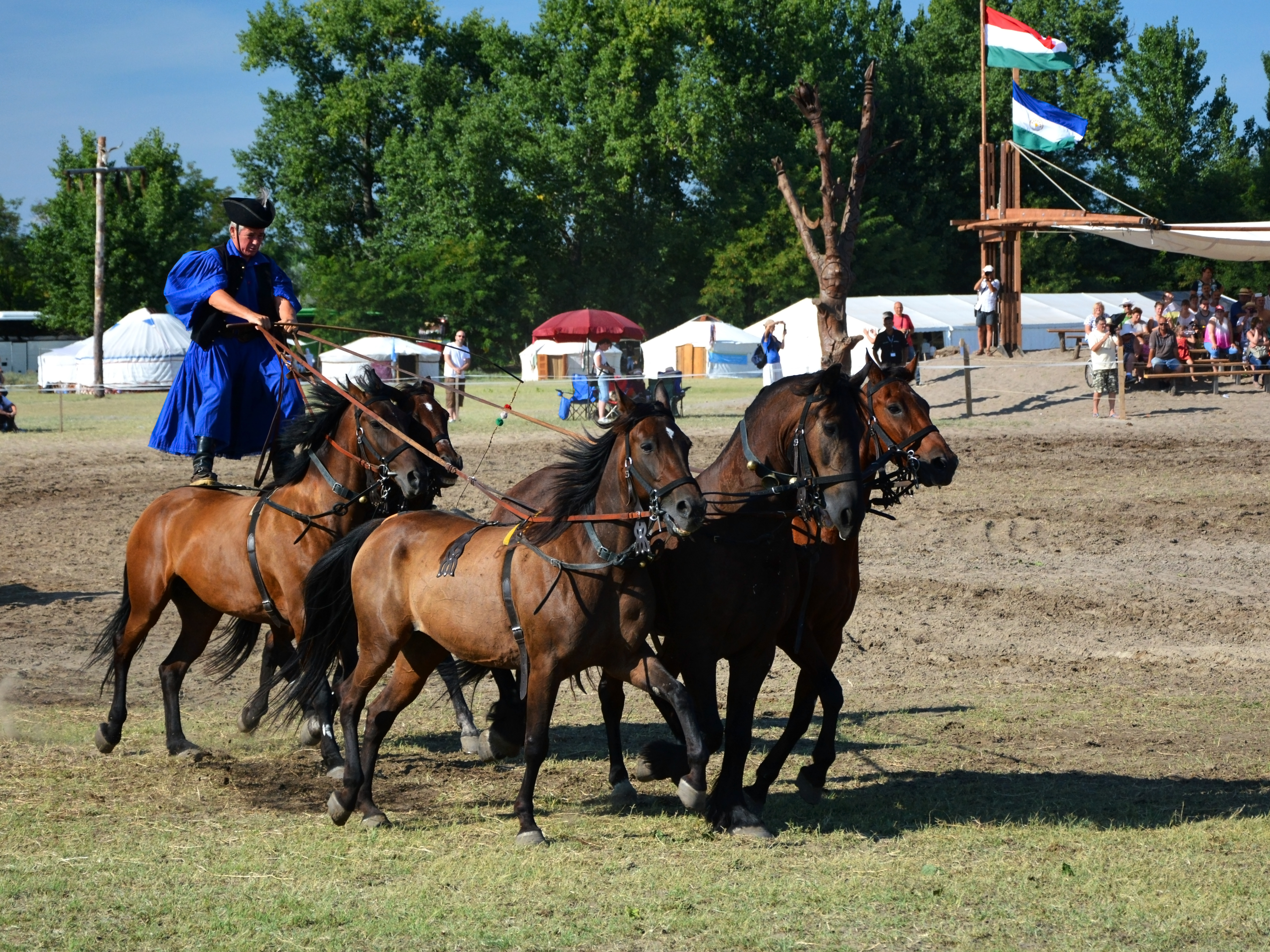
Hungarian post

== See also ==
- Betyárs
- Hajduk (soldiers)
