= Nine-arched Bridge =

The Nine-arched Bridge (Hungarian: Kilenclyukú híd, literally "nine-holed bridge") is the most identifiable symbol of the Hortobágy National Park, Hungary's great plain. This arch bridge was the longest road stone bridge in historic Hungary prior to 1921 when Hungary was reduced to one-third of its former territory. The bridge was built between 1827 and 1833 in a Classical style.

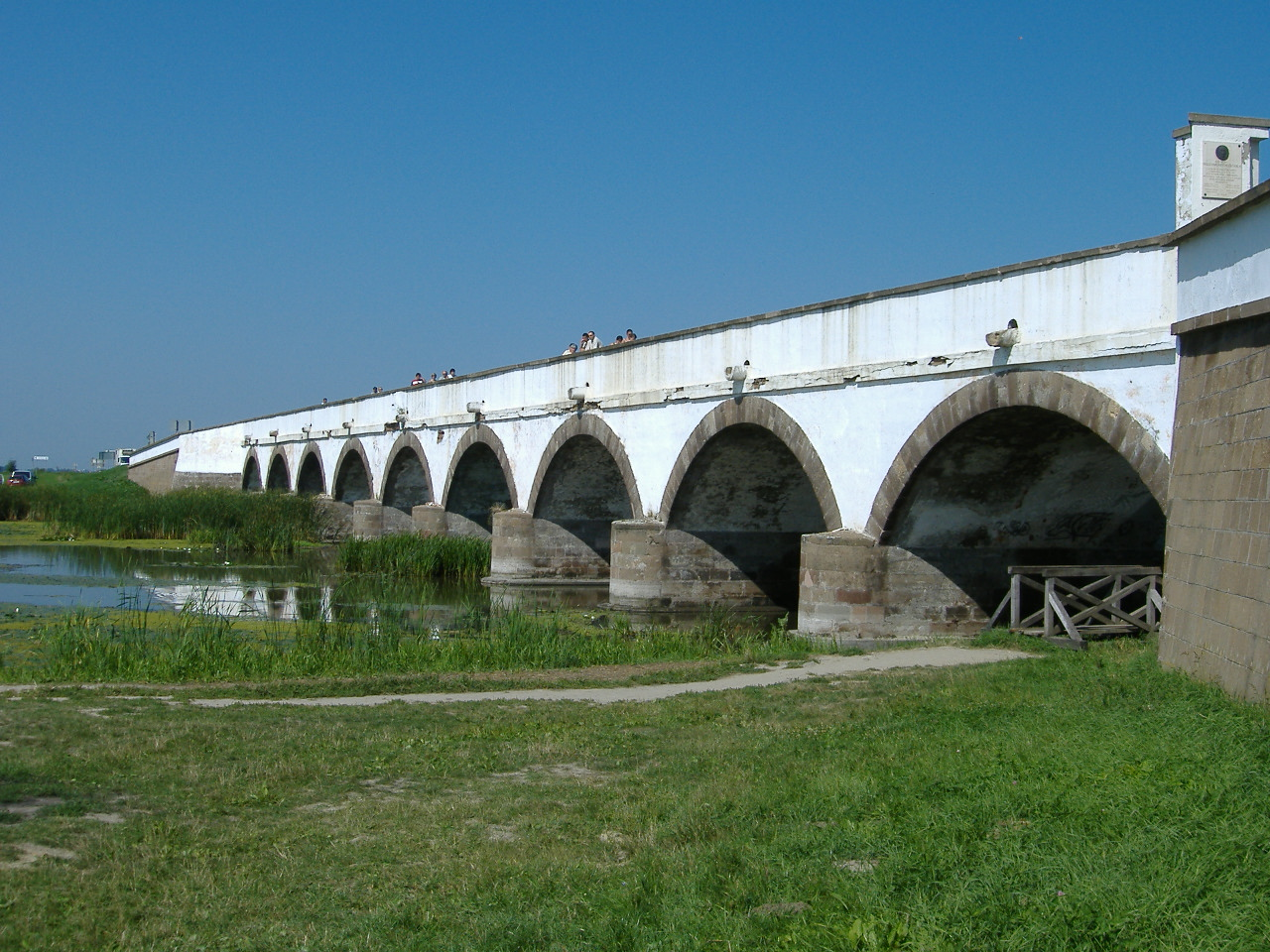
The Nine-arched Bridge

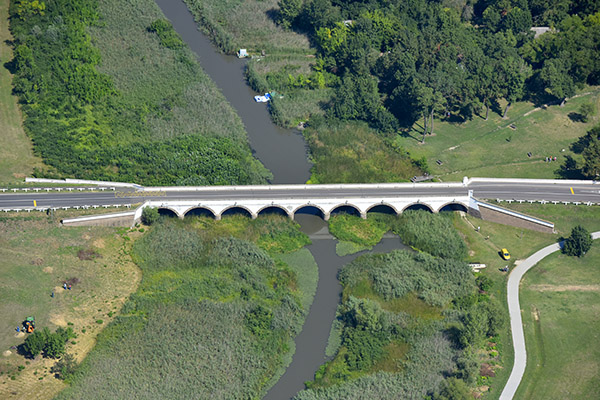
Nine-arched Bridge in Hortobágyi Nemzeti Park

The distance between the two abutments standing on either side of the river is 92.13 metres while the entire length of the stone bridge measures 167.3 metres. The entrance to the bridge on each side is broader, thus making the life of the herdsman easier as approaching animals being herded onto the bridge entered the funnel shaped opening of the bridge.

The predecessor of the Nine-arched Bridge was a wooden structure built in 1697 which deteriorated over time due to heavy traffic. In 1825, after years of costly maintenance of the wooden bridge, the nearby city of Debrecen decided to dismantle it and build a new stone bridge in its place. After a review of several designs, the plan of Ferenc Povolny was accepted. Construction of the new bridge began in 1827 and after its completion in 1833 the wooden bridge was dismantled.

== Sources ==
- "The nine - arch bridge". Hortobágy National Park Directorate.
