= Hortobágy =

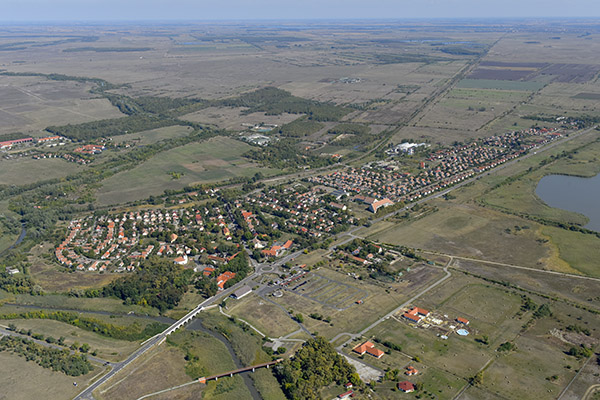

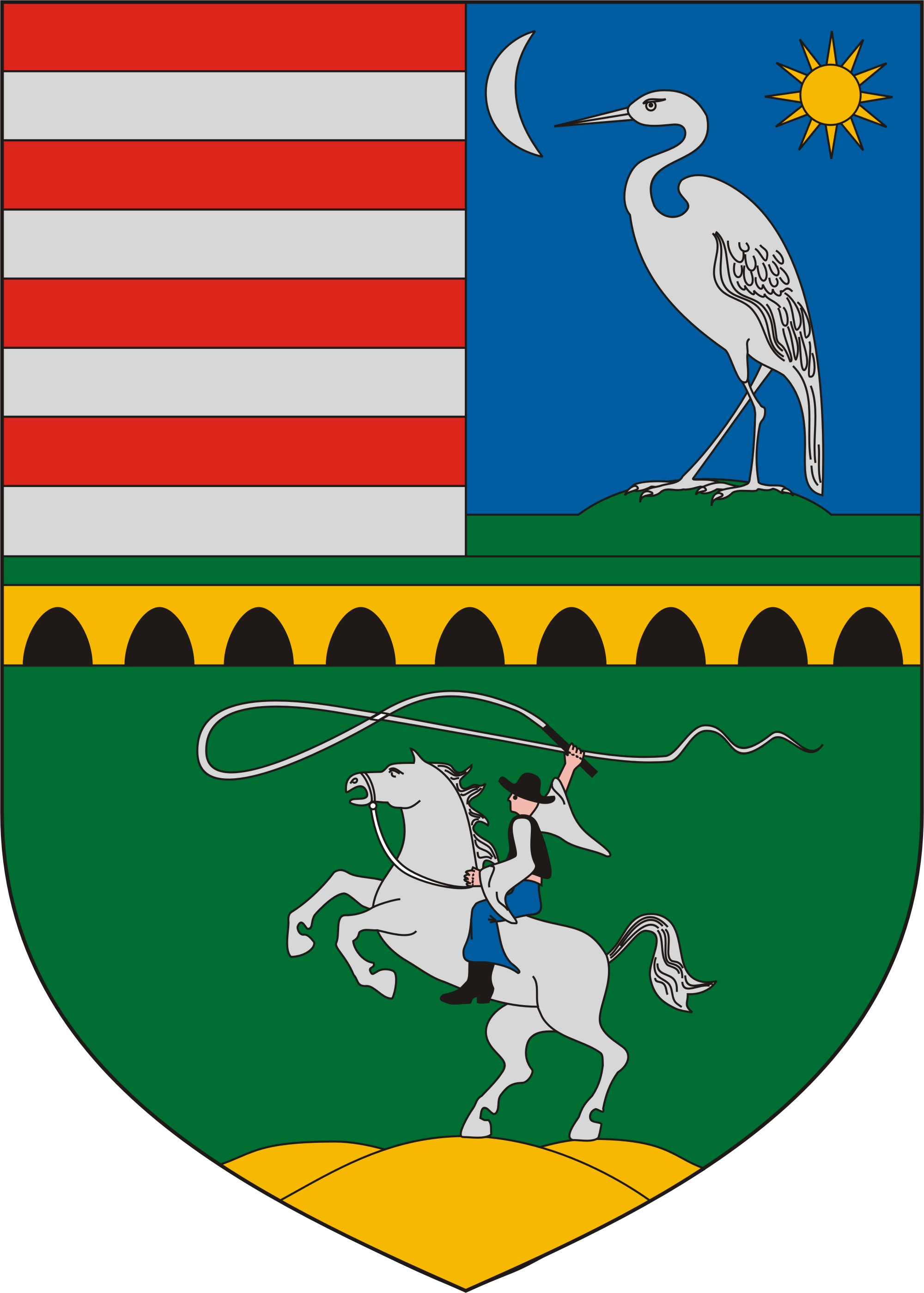
- Coat of arms

- Location of Hortobágy in Hungary
- Coordinates: 47°35′01″N 21°09′07″E
- Country: Hungary
- Region: Northern Great Plain
- County: Hajdú-Bihar

Area
  - Total: 284.6 km^{2} (109.9 sq mi)

Population (2017)
  - Total: 1,410
  - Density: 4.95/km^{2} (12.8/sq mi)
- Time zone: UTC+1 (CET)
  - Summer (DST): UTC+2 (CEST)
- Postal code: 4071
- Area code: +36 74
- Website: https://hortobagy.hu/

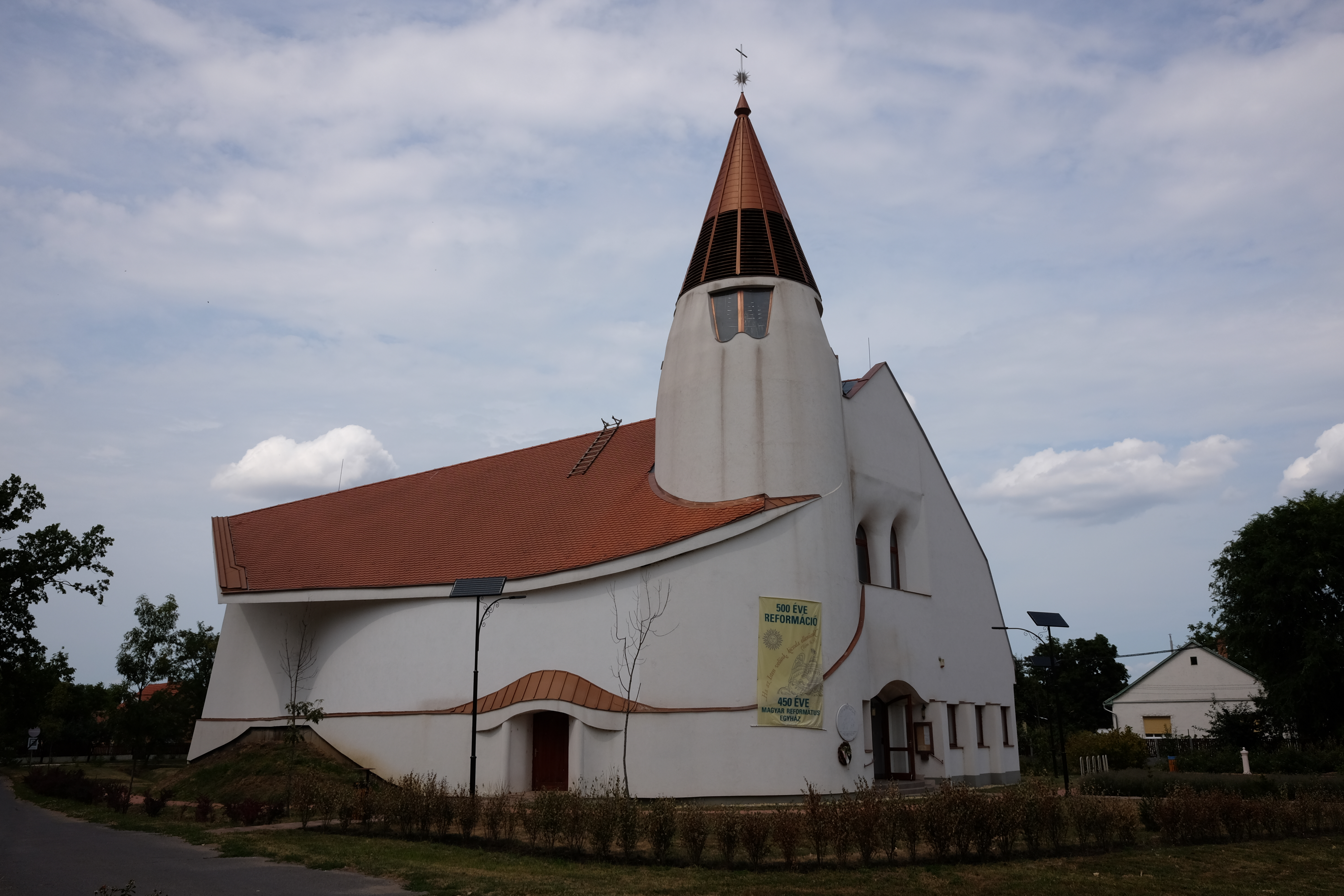
The Ökumenikus Pusztatemplom in the village

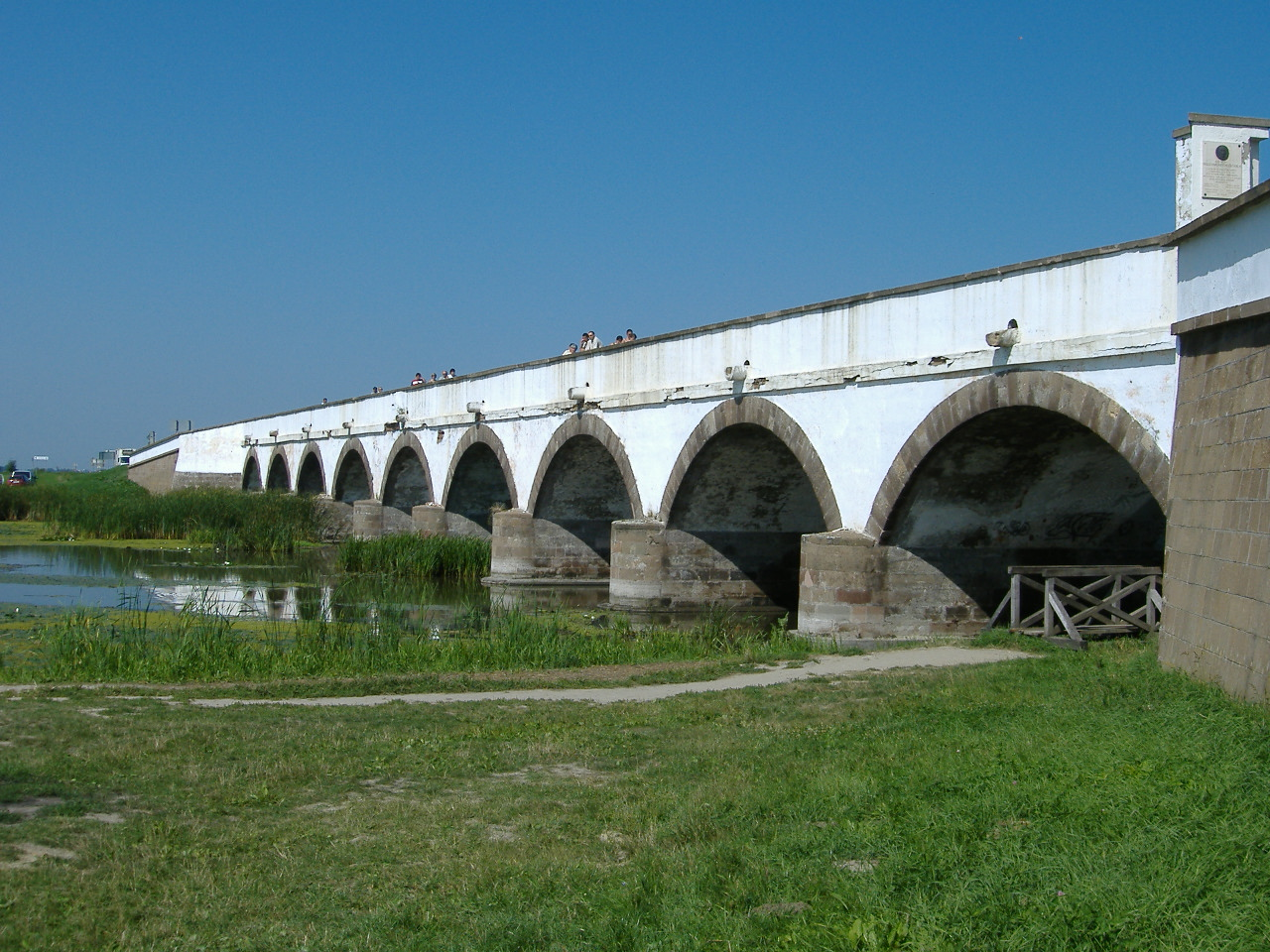
The Nine-arched Bridge over the Hortobágy river

Hortobágy is a village in Hajdú-Bihar County in eastern Hungary. It lies on the banks of the Hortobágy river, which is crossed at Hortobágy by the Nine-arched Bridge, one of the principal man-made monuments of the Hortobágy National Park. The park consists mainly of the remaining areas of Hungarian puszta.

== 2016 explosive incident ==
On 1 July 2016, 4 demolition experts of the Hungarian Defence Force were killed and another seriously injured while attempting to detonate a 250 kilogram Russian-made fragmentation bomb manufactured shortly after WW2. The incident took place at a firing range within the Hortobágy National Park. The firing range covers 4,000 hectares (about 9,800 acres) and has been used for practice by the Hungarian armed forces for decades. It was reported that the detonator had already been removed when the explosion occurred. The remote and sparsely populated area was used as a shooting range by the Hungarian Army for decades following World War II. The soldiers will be honored with the Hazáért Érdemjel medal.
