= Tákos =

Coordinates: 48°09′N 22°26′E

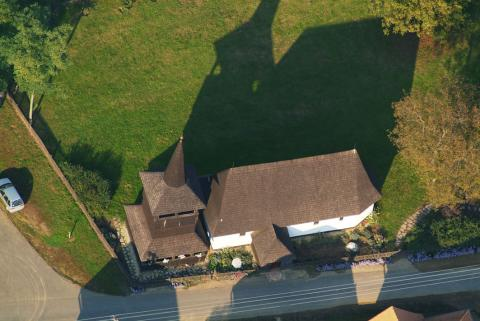
- Church from a bird's eye view

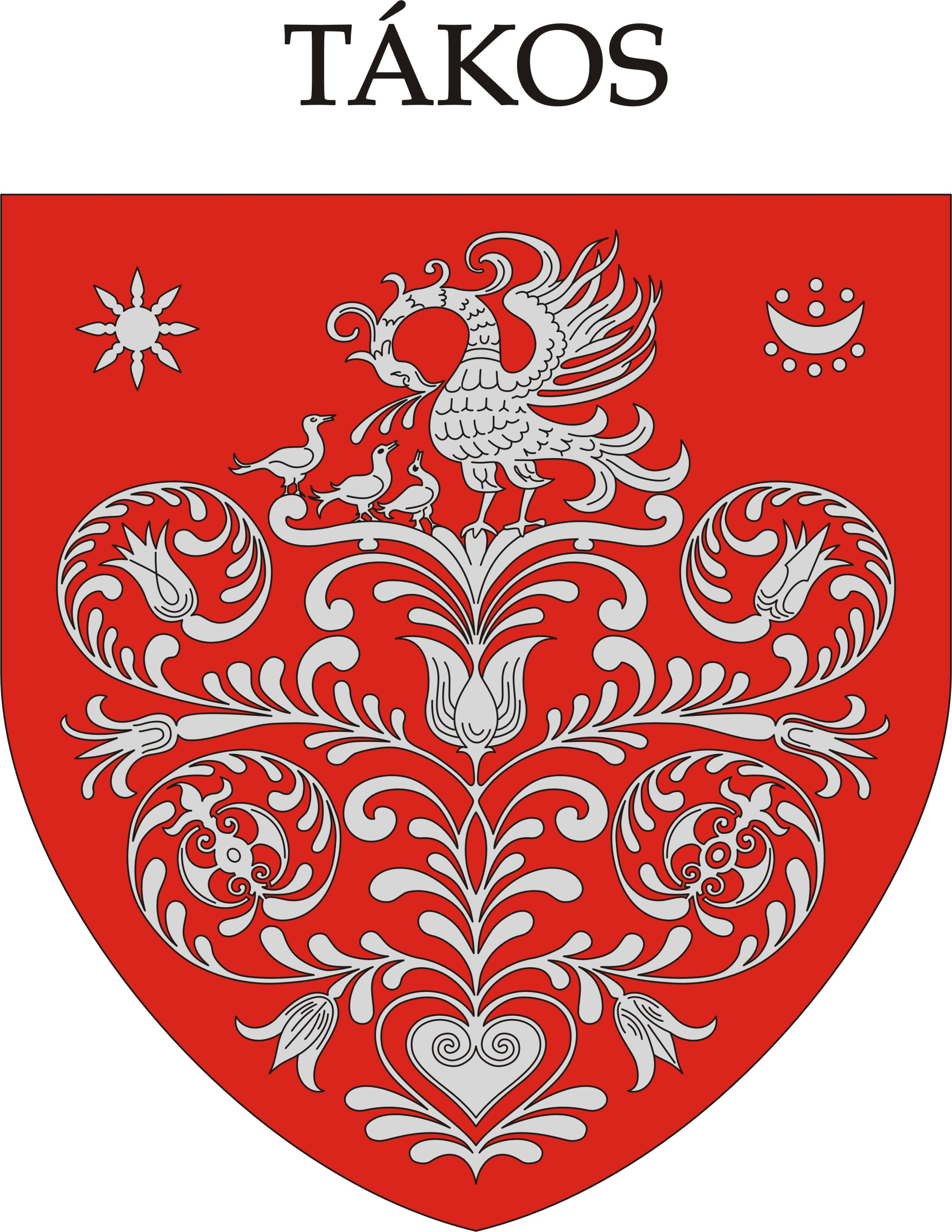
- Coat of arms
- Interactive map of Tákos
- Country: Hungary
- County: Szabolcs-Szatmár-Bereg

Area
  - Total: 10.82 km^{2} (4.18 sq mi)

Population (2001)
  - Total: 411
  - Density: 37.99/km^{2} (98.4/sq mi)
- Time zone: UTC+1 (CET)
  - Summer (DST): UTC+2 (CEST)
- Postal code: 4845
- Area code: 45
- Website: http://www.takos.hu

Location of Szabolcs-Szatmar-Bereg county in Hungary

Tákos is a village in Szabolcs-Szatmár-Bereg county, in the Northern Great Plain region of eastern Hungary.

== Geography ==
Tákos covers an area of 10.82 km^{2} (4 sq mi) and has a population of 411 people (2001).

== Sightseeing ==
The village is famous because of its volk art, especially needlework art of "beregi keresztszemes" (cross-needled workshop) textile style.

== History ==
The first written mention of Tákos dates back to a lawsuit from 1321, according to which Ubul Kállai destroyed the estate of his son, Master Sándor of the Kaplon family, in Tákos.

In the 15th century, through the family of Csarnavoda, Surányi and their related Makray, the family members of Spiš also had a part.

In 1488, the Russian family of Chisinau also acquired property in the settlement.

In 1500, a part of the village was received by János Murgai as a royal donation.

In the tax census of 1567, Pál Tákosi, Imre Szalmadi and László Görbedi were the landlords of the settlement.

In the second half of the 17th century, the Russian family of Csicseri had a property and a manor house here, from the 18th to the 19th century. and in the 16th century it was owned by the Buday family.

=== Church ===
The Reformed Church of Tákos was built in 1766, expanding on a small wooden church first mentioned in 1733. The church was expanded with walls made of sticks covered on both sides with clay and mud; it is believed that these materials were used following Maria Theresa's ban of stone and brick to followers of the Reformation. The church is referred to as the 'barefoot Notre-Dame.
