= Racka =

Breed of sheep

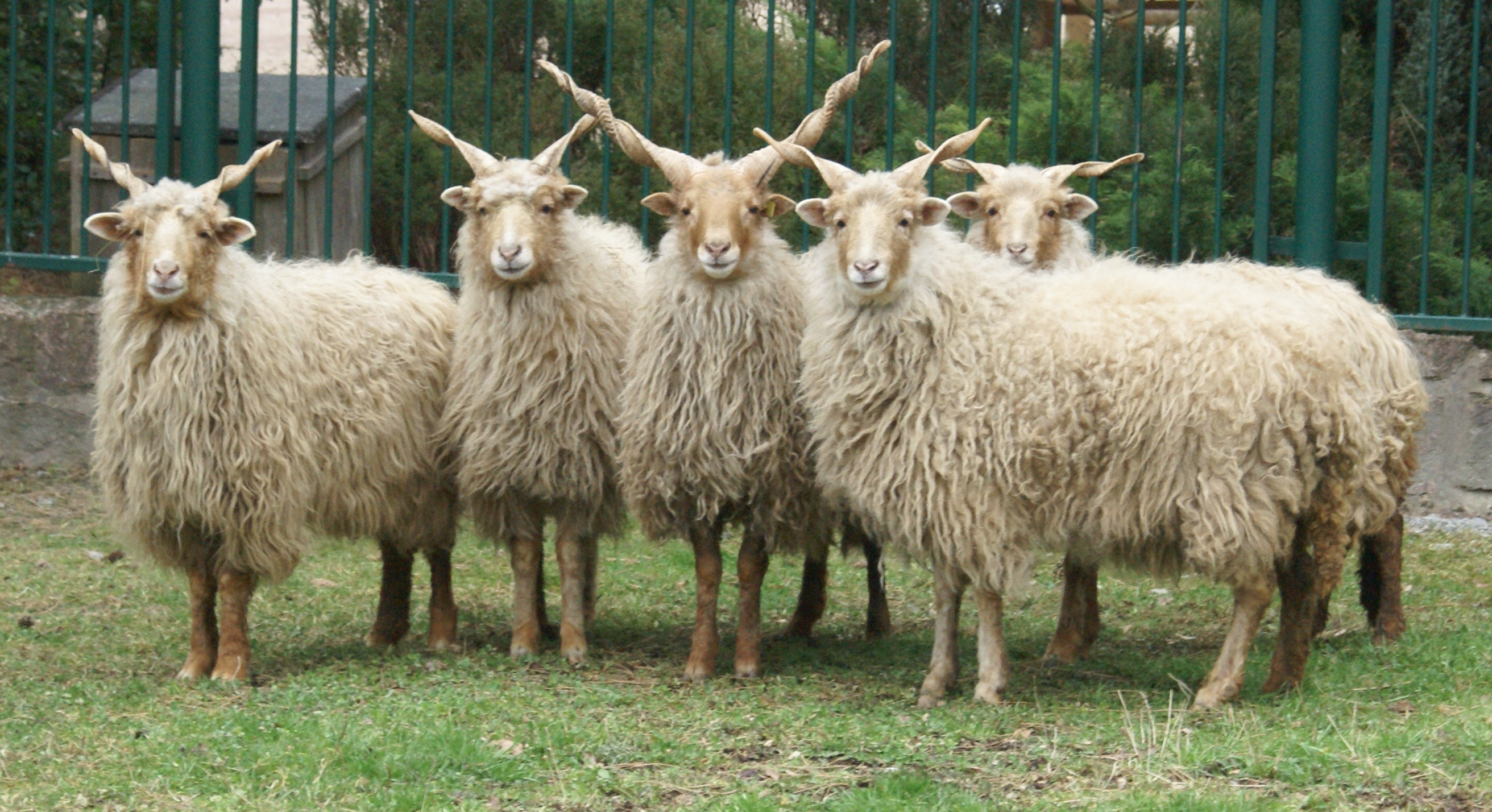
A flock of Racka sheep

The Racka (pronounced /rɑːtskɑː/ Hungarian [ˈrɒts.kɒ]), or Hortobágy Racka Sheep, is an endangered breed of sheep originating in Hungary, known for its curly and crimped wool and unusual spiral horns, which are seen on both the rams and the ewes (albeit slightly shorter on the females). These unique appendages are unlike any other domestic sheep horns, and may grow up to 2.0 ft (0.61 m) long, growing at a roughly 45-degree, diagonal angle; the shortest standard length is 20 in (51 cm) for rams and 12–15 in (30–38 cm) for ewes.

Although the Racka has been kept by Hungarians for several centuries, once being the most common sheep breed in the country, it is now considered a rare breed, with an estimated 2,500 animals remaining. Today, the largest flocks are found in the Hortobágy steppes of Hungary and, to a lesser extent, in Caraș-Severin, Romania. However, due to its unique features, it has seen popularity abroad, being exported in growing numbers to the United Kingdom, United States and France; while in its home range interest remains limited. It is a hardy, multi-purpose breed used for milking, wool and meat. Their wool is long and coarse, and appears in two general types: a cream or off-white (on animals with light brown to apricot skin), and a black to dark brown variation (with black skin). Ewes weigh around 88 lb (40 kg) and rams 132 lb (60 kg).

The breed's unique appearance and quiet disposition make it a desirable animal for hobbyists. The British Racka Sheep Society has stated that the breed has a high sensitivity to its environment, being especially wary of perceived "threats" like loud noises or machinery, as well as being alert for predators; these characteristics make the breed somewhat flighty, easily spooked and potentially difficult to contain or capture, if needed.

== Characteristics ==
1836 illustration of Racka sheep, identified as "Cretan or Wallachian Sheep", from The Penny Magazine

This breed is unique in appearance, with both sexes possessing long, spiraling horns, which protrude almost straight upwards and out, at a slight angle, from the top of the head.

There are two color patterns with the Racka, the most common being brown wool covering the heads and legs with the fiber varying in color from dark brown to light brown and white. Individuals can also be solid black, with black skin and wool, or a dark chocolate brown. The wool tips on black sheep fade to a reddish-black with exposure to sunlight; as they mature, the points of the fiber turn grey. The fiber diameter varies within this breed, and generally is found to be 12 to 40 micrometres with a yield of 38% to 65%. Staple length is approximately 30 cm (12 in). Fleece weight must be at least 3 kg (6.6 lb) for rams. The softness and crimp of the wool would indicate its interest with hand spinners.

The minimum acceptable mature body weight for ewes is 40 kg (88 lb) and for rams 60 kg (130 lb). The rams average 72 cm (28 in) in height.

The sheep were traditionally kept for both milk and meat. The fleece is coarse.

A similar breed is the Gyimes Racka (Hungarian: gyimesi racka), native to the Ghimeș-Făget region of Romania.
