= Hortobágy National Park =

National park in Hungary

Hortobágy National Park - the Puszta
UNESCO World Heritage Site
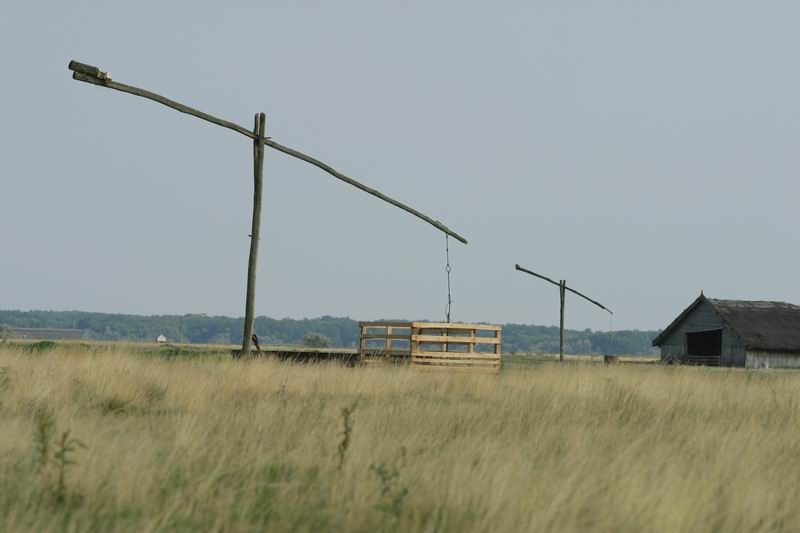

- Location within Hungary
- Location: Counties of Borsod-Abaúj-Zemplén, Heves, Hajdú-Bihar and Jász-Nagykun-Szolnok, Hungary
- Criteria: Cultural: iv, v
- Reference: 474
- Inscription: 1999 (23rd Session)
- Area: 74,820 ha (184,900 acres)
- Buffer zone: 199,380 ha (492,700 acres)
- Website: http://www.hnp.hu/en
- Coordinates: 47°35′40″N 21°9′24″E

Ramsar Wetland
- Official name: Hortobágy
- Designated: 11 April 1979
- Reference no.: 189

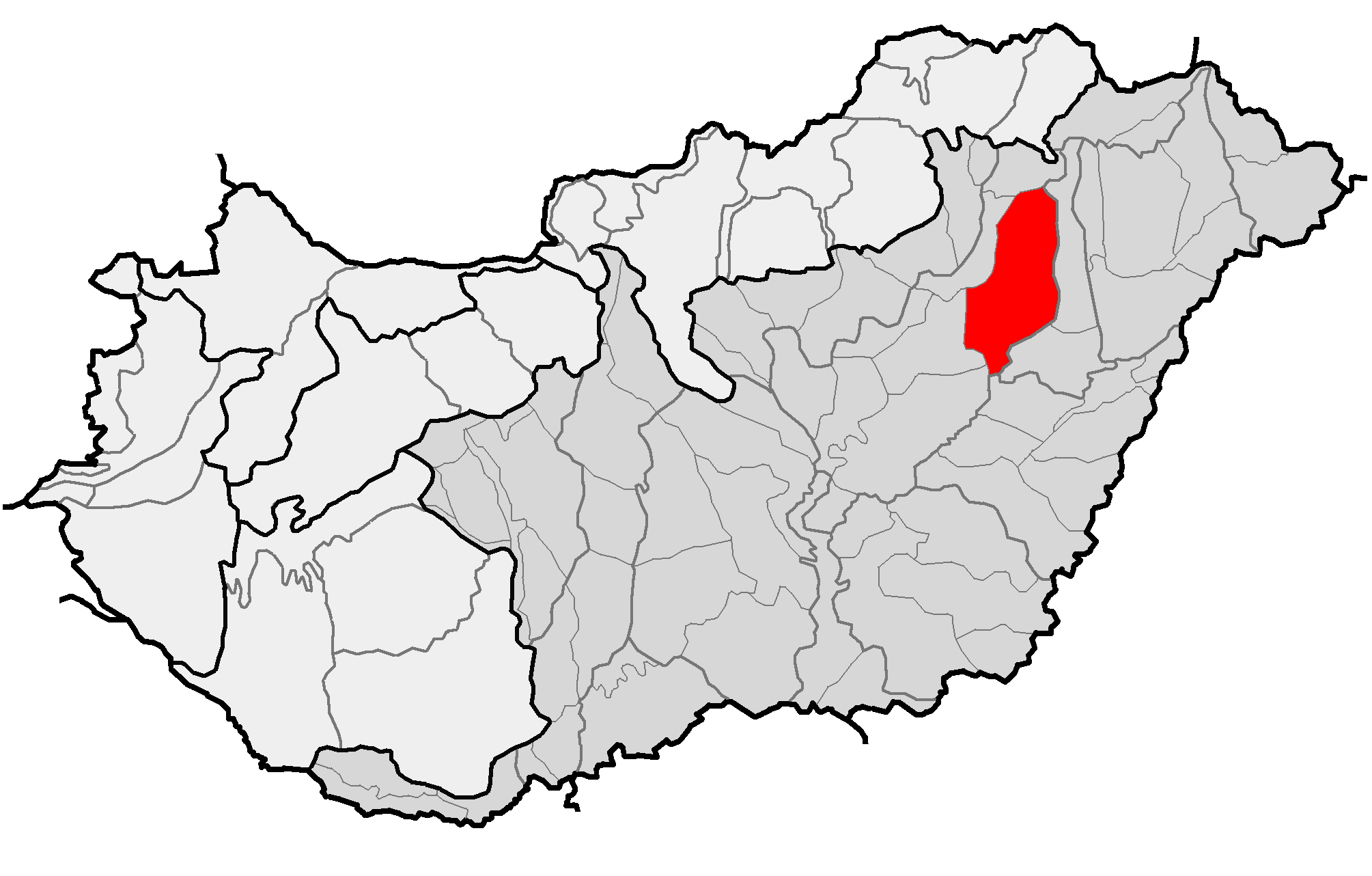
Location of Hortobágy as one of microregions in physical geography of Hungary

Hortobágy (Hungarian pronunciation: [ˈhortobaːɟ]) is an 800 km^{2} national park in eastern Hungary. The park, a part of the Alföld (Great Plain), was designated as a national park in 1973 (the first in Hungary), and elected among the World Heritage Sites in 1999. The Hortobágy is Hungary's largest protected area, and the largest semi-natural grassland in Europe.

Until recently it was believed that this alkaline steppe was formed by the clear cutting of huge forests in the Middle Ages, followed by measures to control the course of the Tisza River, allegedly resulting in the soil's current structure and pH. However, Hortobágy is much older, with alkalinization estimated to have started ten thousand years ago, when the Tisza first found its way through the Great Hungarian Plain, cutting off many streams from their sources in the Northern Mountains. The formation was finished by grazing animals and wild horses during the Ice Age, followed by domesticated animals. The site was inscribed on the UNESCO World Heritage List in 1999 because of its long cultural history (stretching back more than four millennia), its scenery, and its testimony to traditional methods of pastoralism.

One of its most iconic sites is the Nine-holed Bridge. Traditional T-shaped sweep wells dot the landscape, as well as the occasional mirage of trees shimmering in the reflected heat of the puszta (steppe). Part of the national park is a dark sky preserve.

Hortobágy has also had more negative connotations, as a site of forced labour under the communist regime.

== Flora and fauna ==
Hortobágy is a steppe, a grassy plain with Hungarian Grey cattle, racka, Italian Mediterranean buffalo, and Nonius horses tended by mounted herdsmen called csikós. It provides habitat for various species including the nominate subspecies of both the roe deer, and European wildcat, the European red fox, the European ground squirrel, the southern festoon butterfly, and 342 species of birds. The red-footed falcon, stone curlew, great bustard, European roller, saker falcon, eastern imperial eagle, European bee-eater, the nominate subspecies of the Eurasian hoopoe, great egret, common starling, Eurasian spoonbill, grey heron, whiskered tern, black tern, western marsh harrier, common tern, the white stork, pied avocet, pygmy cormorant, black stork, white-tailed eagle, western greylag goose, eastern European bearded reedling, squacco heron, glossy ibis, wood sandpiper, black-winged stilt, and mute swan are all represented by breeding populations.

The area is also an important stopover site for migratory species of birds such as the common crane, dotterel, and lesser white-fronted geese.

Hortobágy also has a herd of around 25 Przewalski's horses, a breeding centre for Taurus cattle, one of several attempts to re-create the extinct aurochs, and just outside the park is an animal hospital and a small zoo for rescued animals that can not be released into the wild such as Eurasian wolves, European jackals, saker falcons, Eurasian griffon vultures, great white pelicans, greylag geese, European wildcat, and Carpathian wild boar.

== Gallery ==
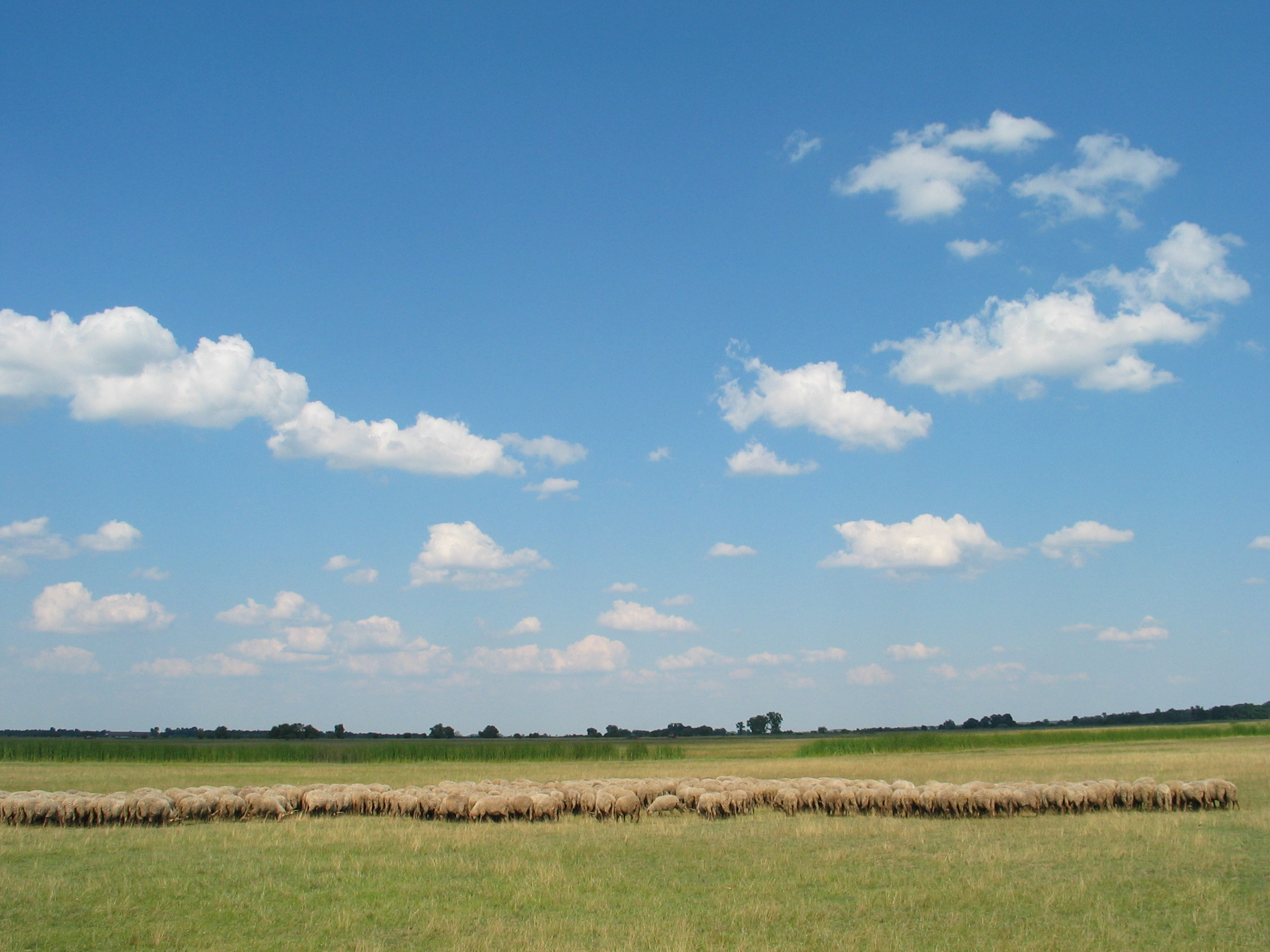
Herds of sheep

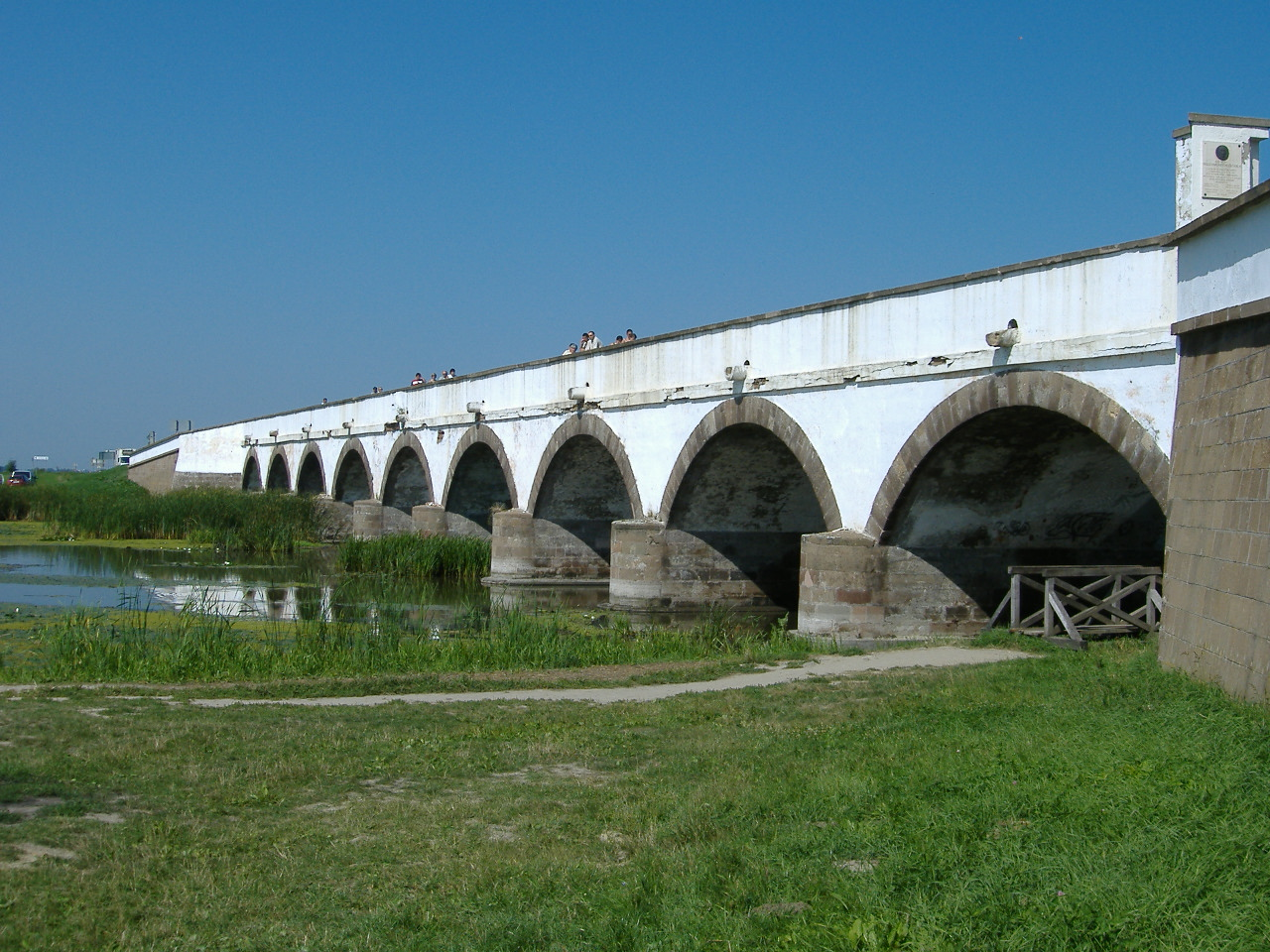
The Nine-holed Bridge

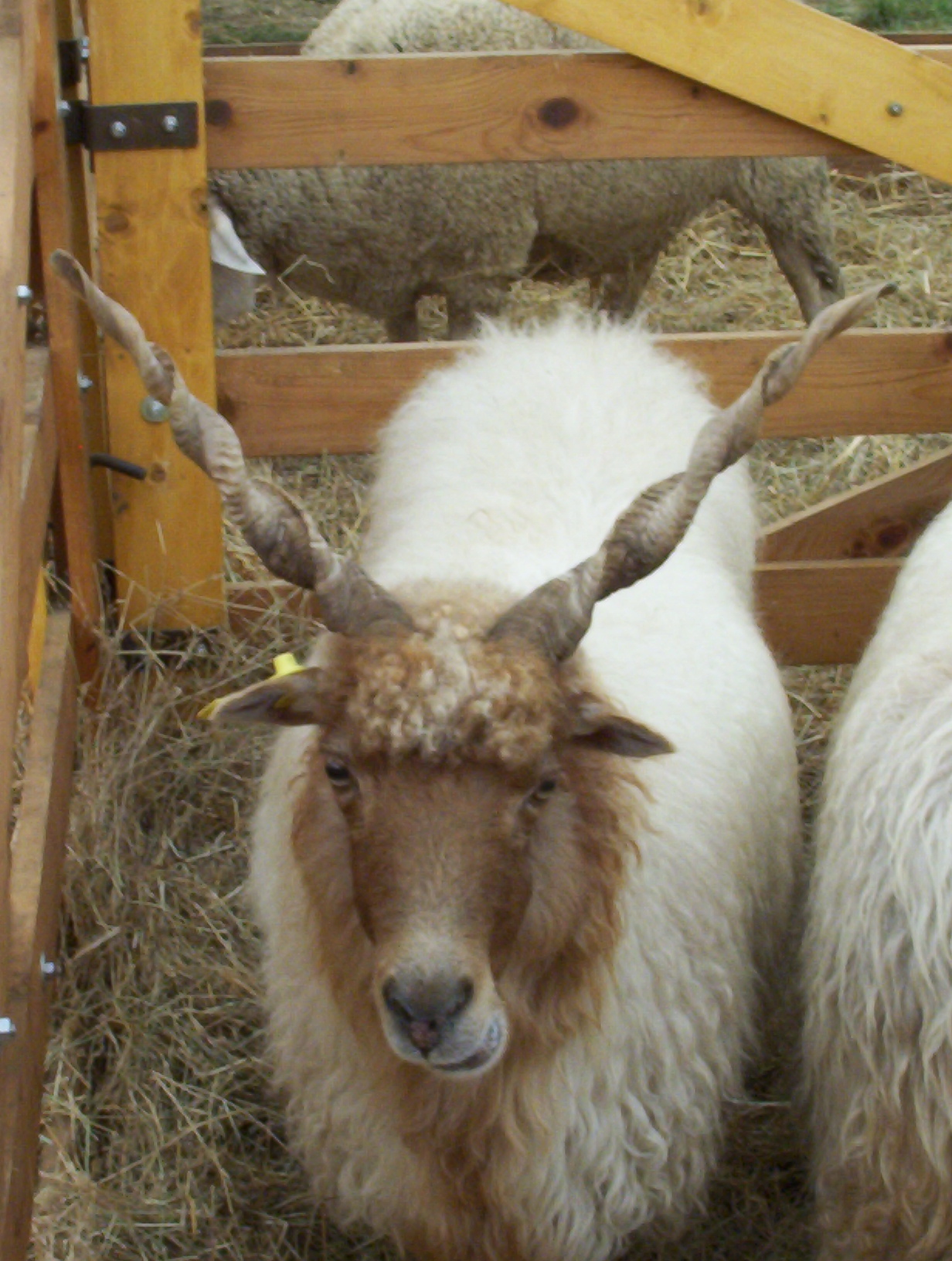
Racka sheep

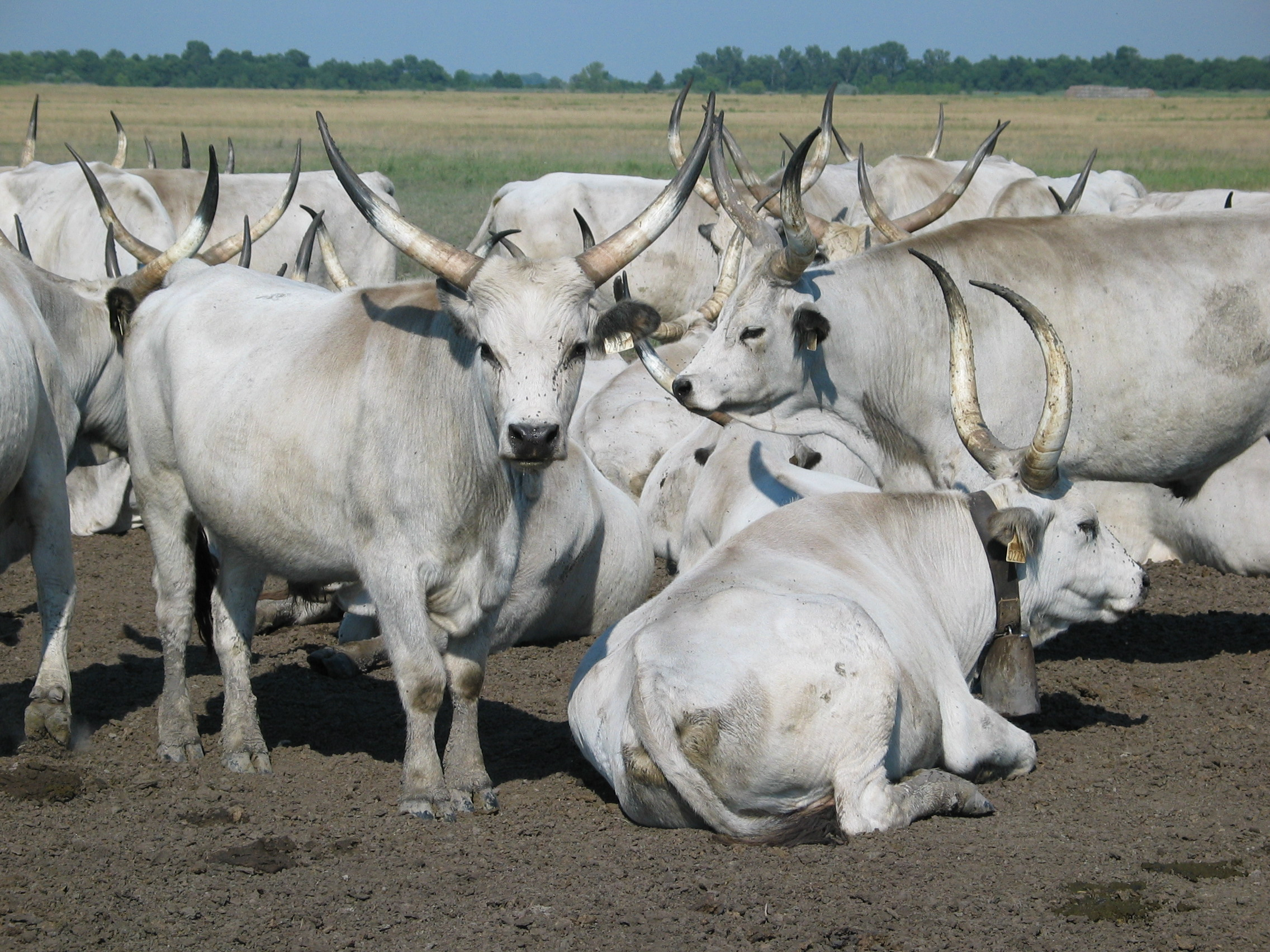
Hungarian Grey cattle

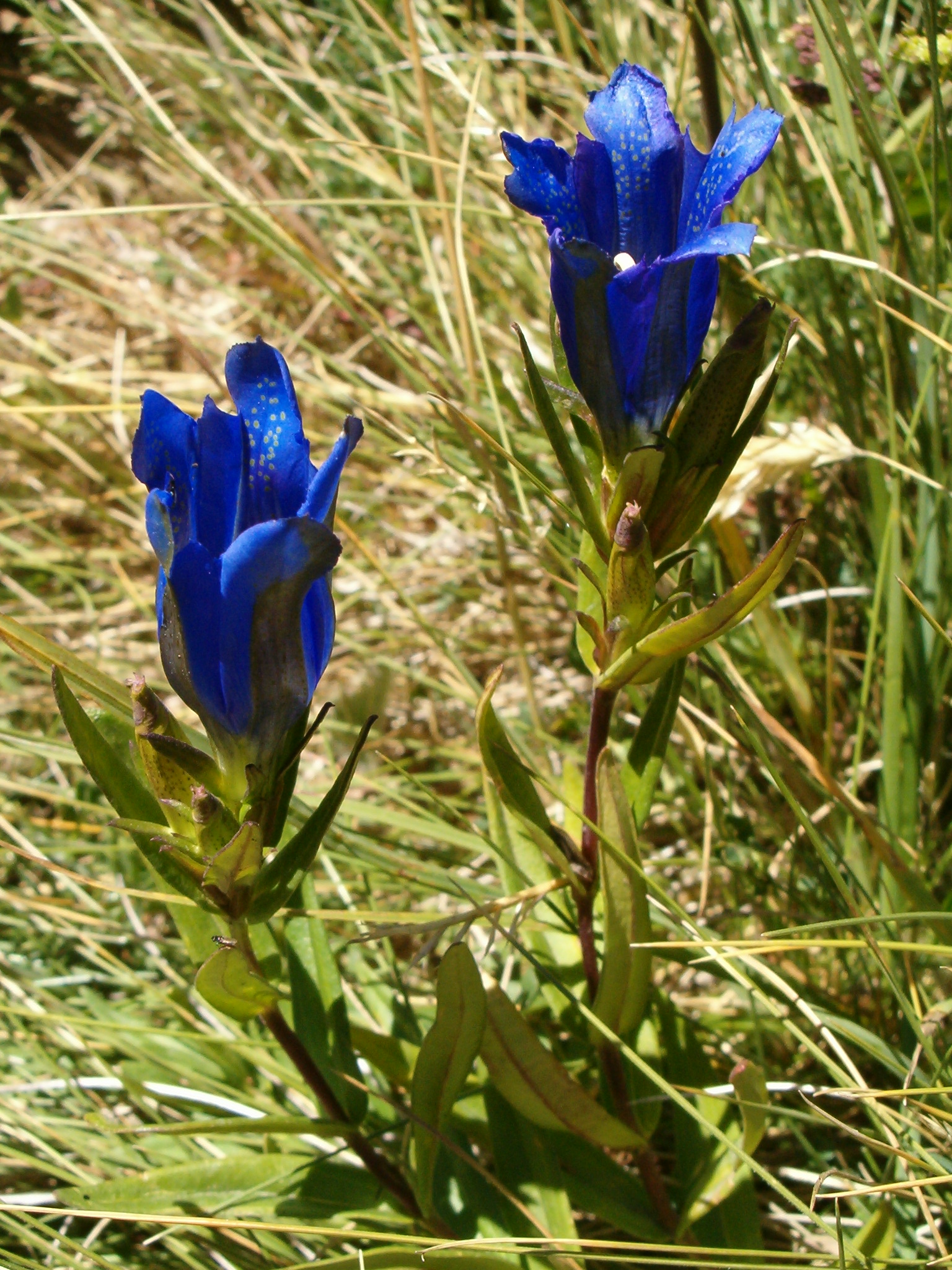
Gentiana pneumonanthe

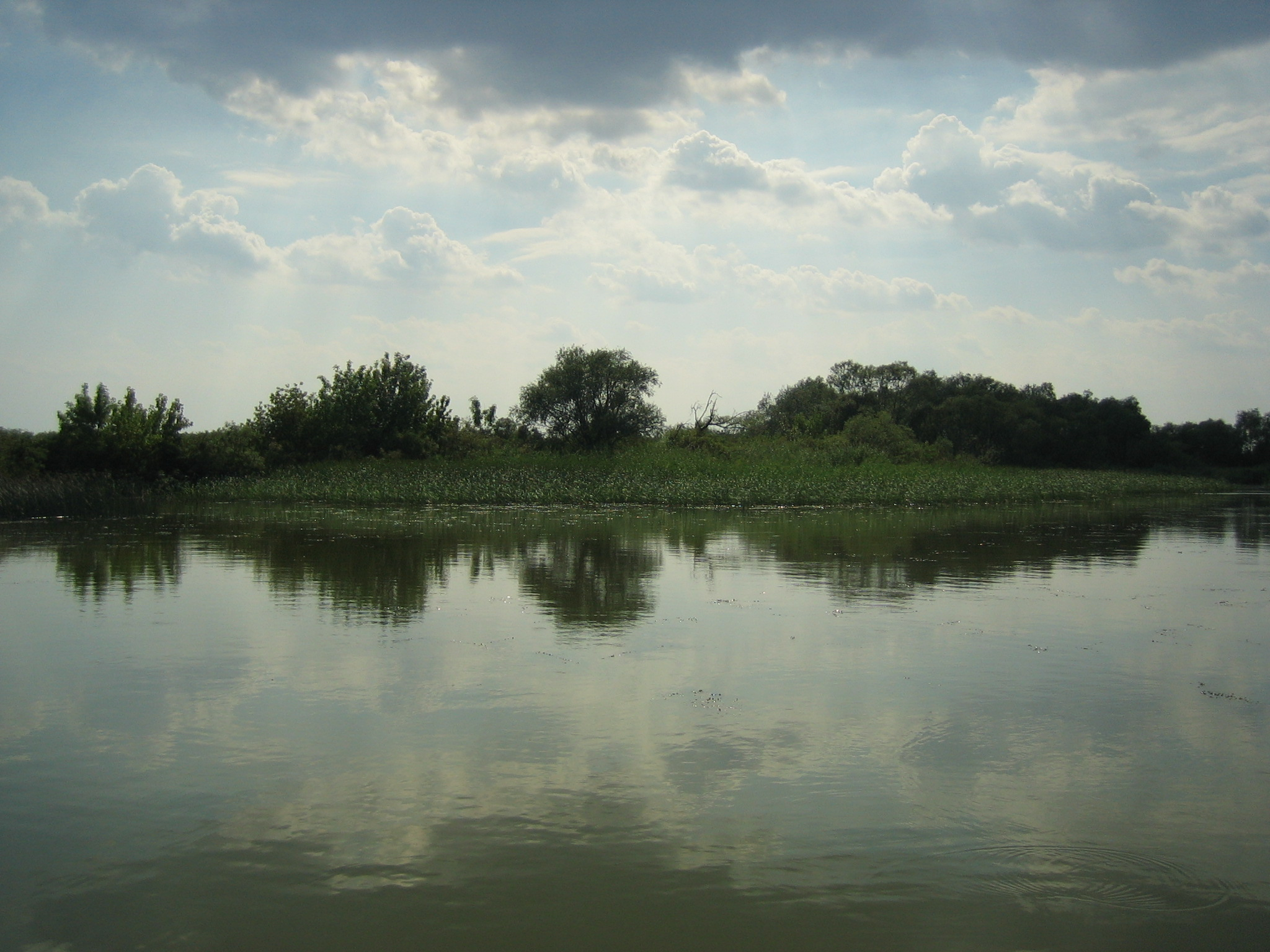
Lake Tisza

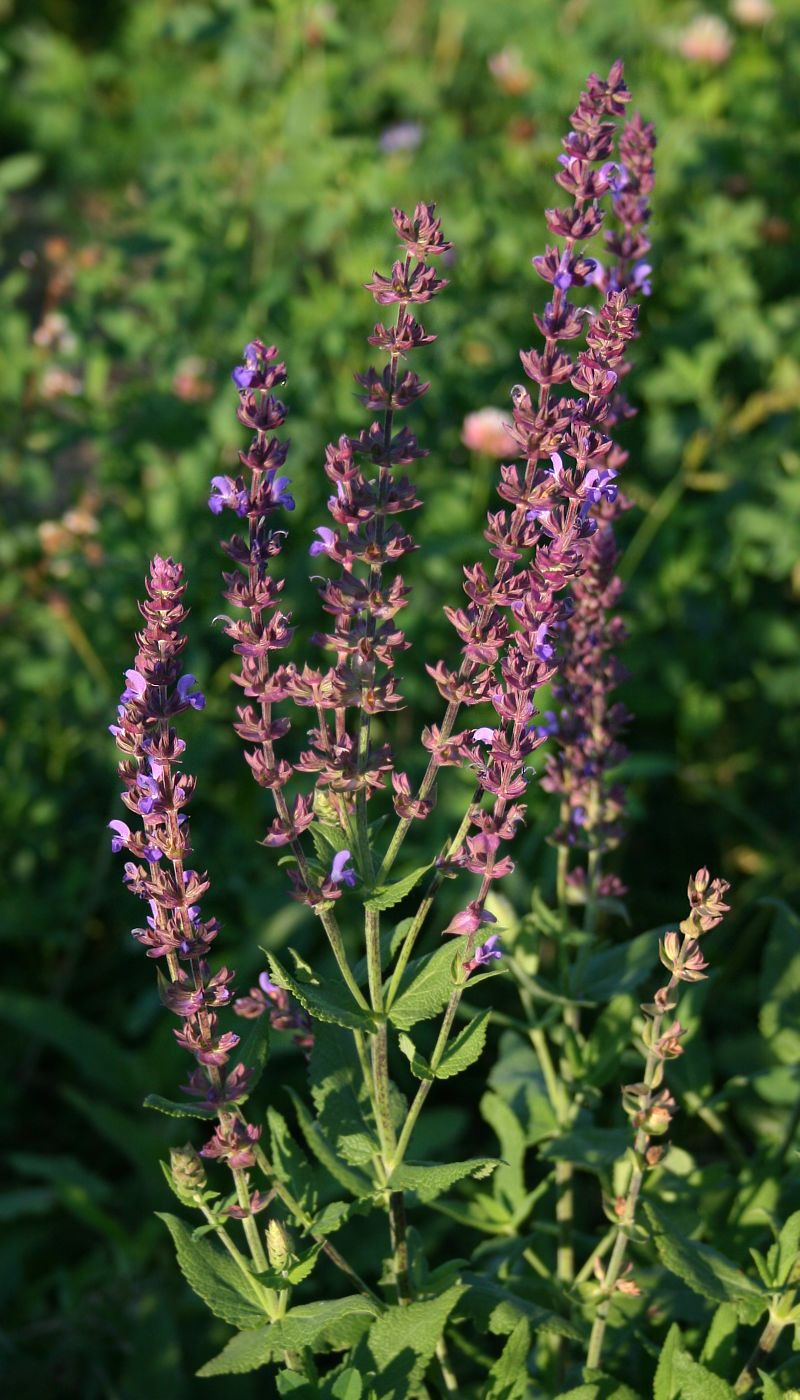
Salvia

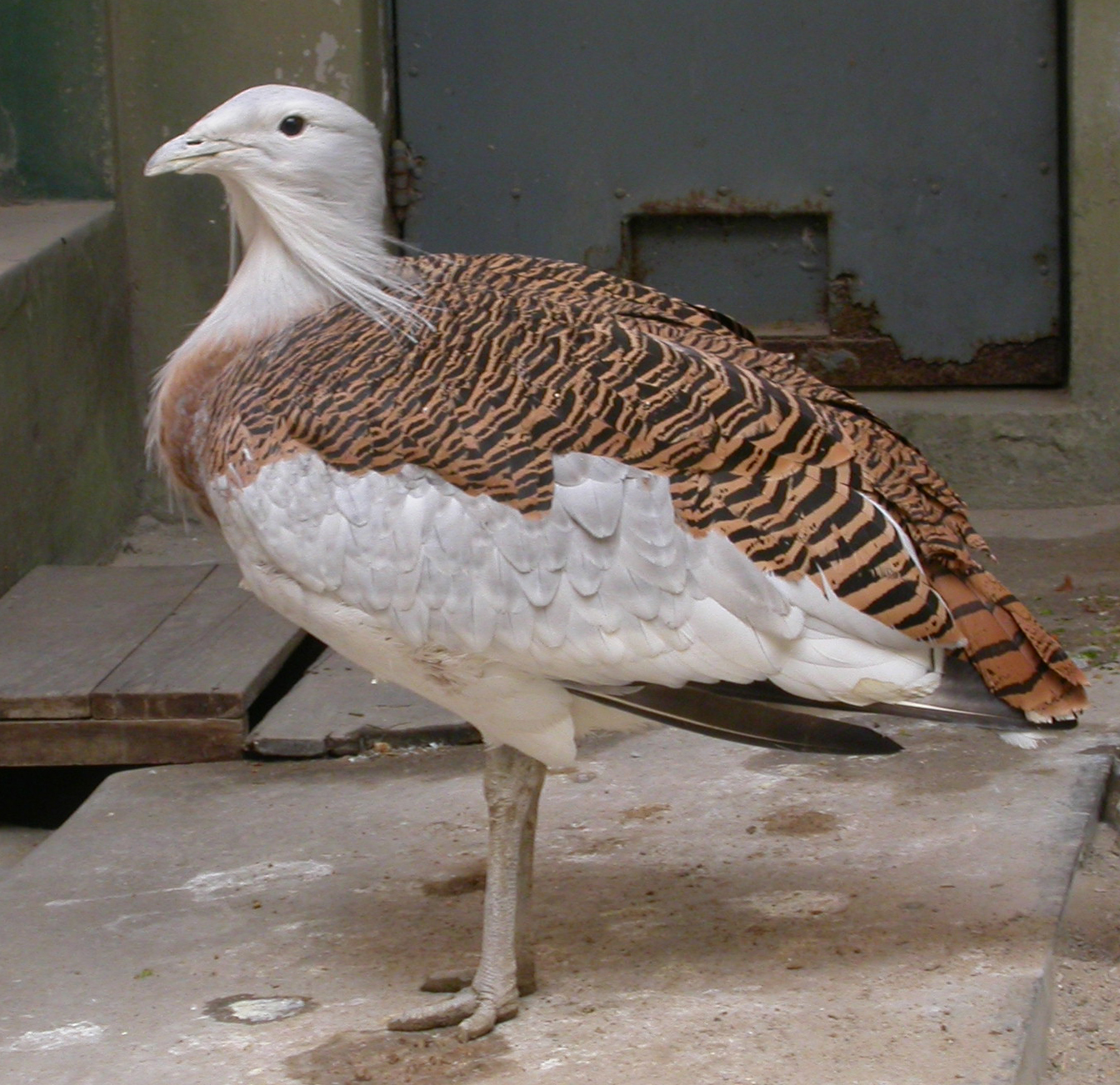
Great bustard

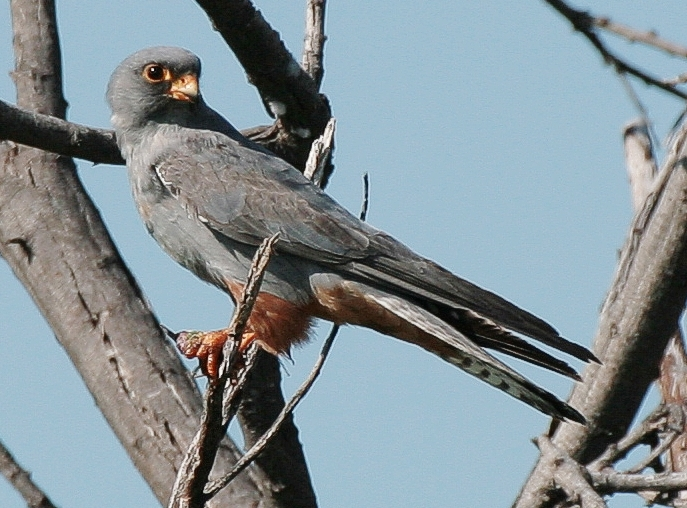
Red-footed falcon

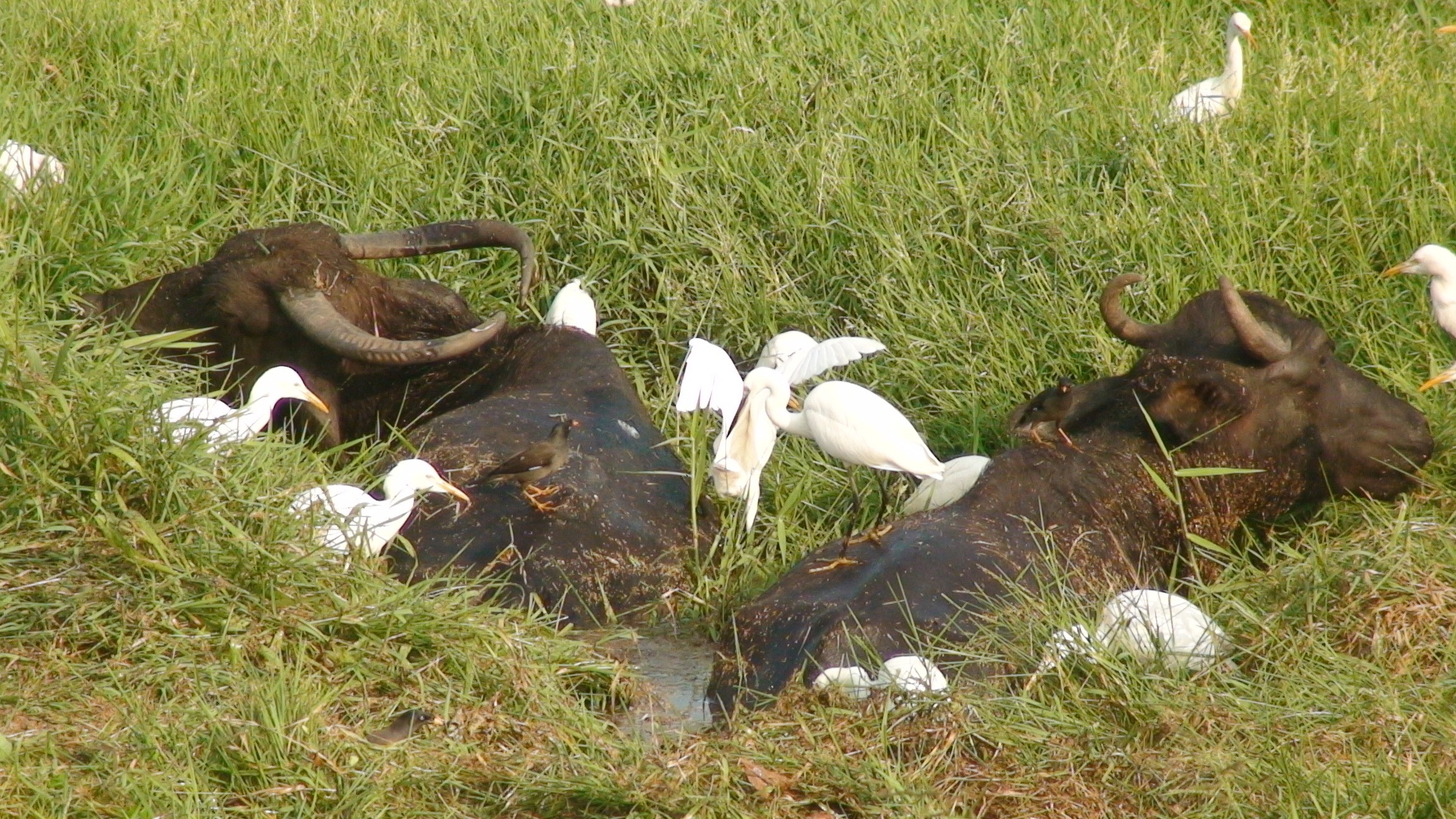
Water buffalo

== See also ==
- National symbols of Hungary
