= Great Hungarian Plain =

Largest part of the Pannonian Plain

Coordinates: 47°00′N 20°30′E

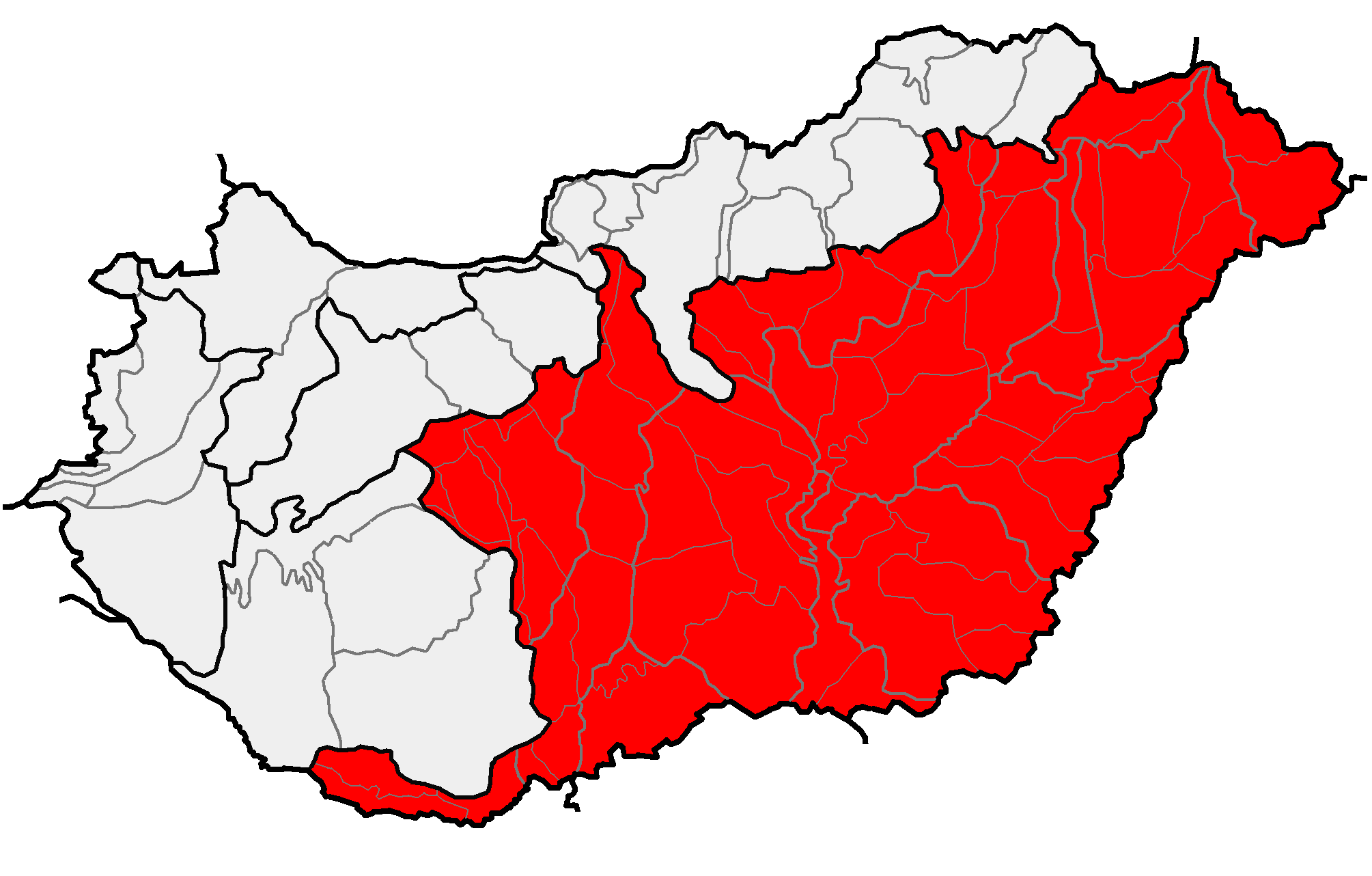
The area of the Alföld in Hungary

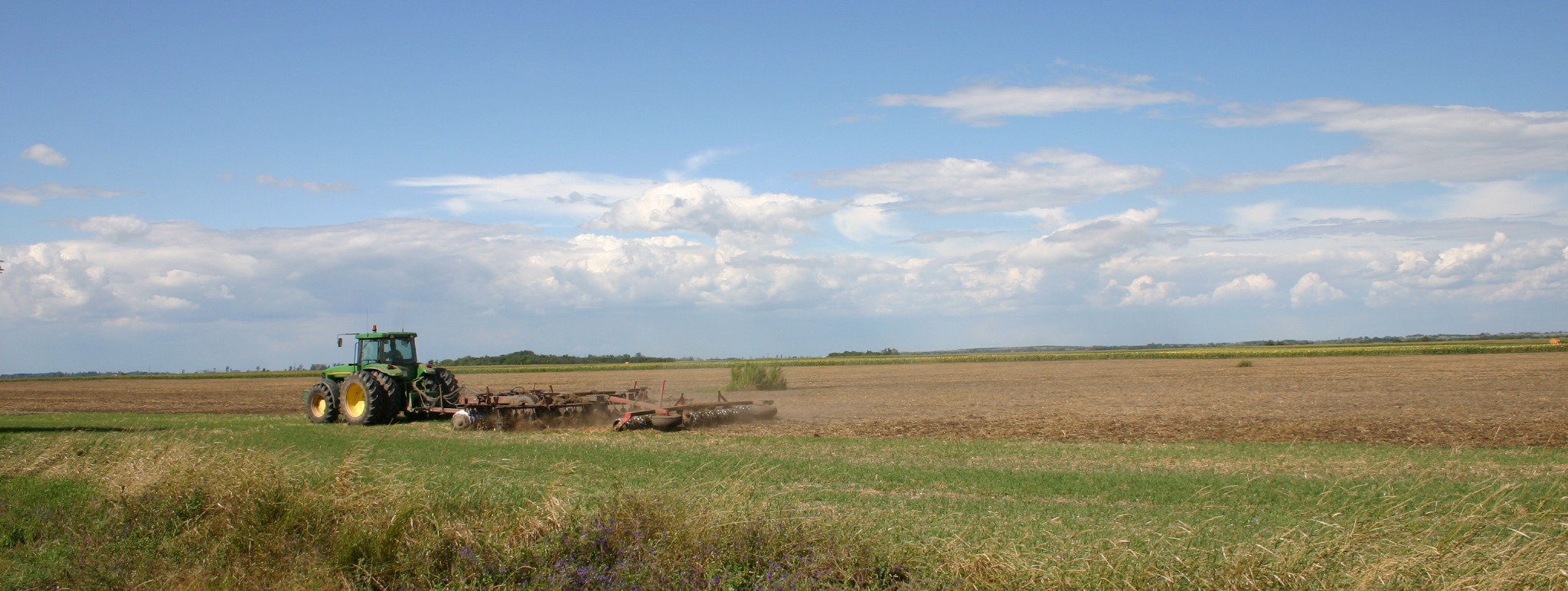
Modern agriculture in the plain

The Great Hungarian Plain (also known as Alföld or Great Alföld, Hungarian: Alföld [ˈɒlføld] or Nagy Alföld) is a plain occupying the majority of the modern territory of Hungary. It is the largest part of the wider Pannonian Plain (however, the Great Hungarian Plain was not part of the ancient Roman province Pannonia). Its territory significantly shrank due to its eastern and southern boundaries being adjusted by the new political borders created after World War I when the Treaty of Trianon was signed in 1920.

== Boundaries ==
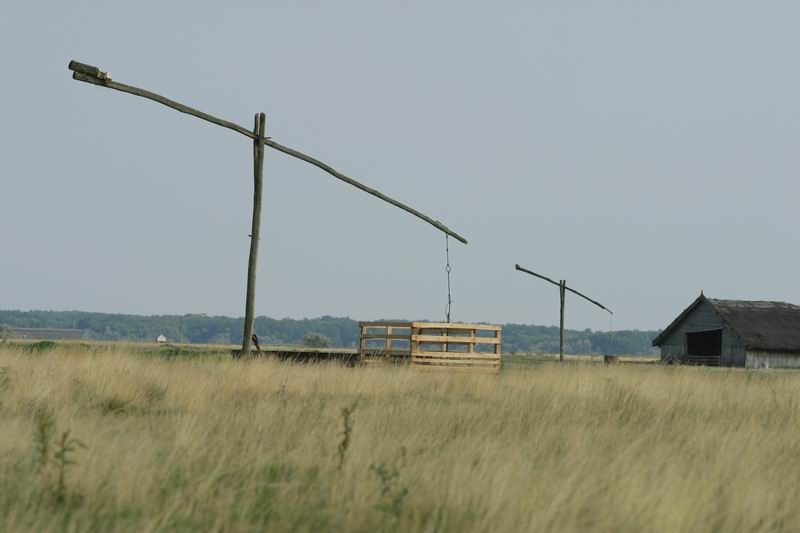
Wells in the Hortobágy National Park Puszta, with a stable

Its boundaries are the Carpathians in the north and east, the Transdanubian Mountains and the Dinaric Alps in the southwest, and approximately the Sava river in the south.

== Terminology disputes about wider location of the Plain ==
The Great Hungarian Plain is often depicted as "part of" the Pannonian Basin, however it is often disputed by Hungarian geographers, due to its erroneous and unhistorical nature of the "Pannonian Basin" term.

Regarding the name as such, in terms of ancient history, namely that the northern and eastern boundary line of the namesake Roman province of Pannonia was formed by the River Danube. The Roman province Pannonia was bounded on the north and east by the Danube river, thus the Great Hungarian Plain was clerly not part of that ancient Roman province.

== Geography ==
=== Plain in Hungary ===
Its territory covers approximately 52,000 km^{2} (20,000 sq mi) of Hungary, approximately 56% of its total area of 93,030 km^{2} (35,920 sq mi). The highest point of the plain is Hoportyó (183 m (600 ft)); the lowest point is the Tisza River. The terrain ranges from flat to rolling plains.

The most important Hungarian writers inspired by and associated with the plain are Ferenc Móra and Zsigmond Móricz, as well as the poets Sándor Petőfi and Gyula Juhász.

Hungarian scientists born on the plain include Zoltán Bay, physicist; János Irinyi, chemist, inventor of the noiseless match; János Kabay, pharmacologist; Gábor Kátai, physician and pharmacist; and Frigyes Korányi, physician and pulmonologist.

The most important river of the plain is the Tisza.

The notable cities and towns with medicinal baths are Debrecen, Berekfürdő, Cserkeszőlő, Gyula, Hajdúszoboszló, Orosháza, Szentes and Szolnok.

Among the cultural festivals and programmes characteristic of the region are the Csángófesztivál (Csángó Festival) in Jászberény, the Cseresznyefesztivál (Sweet Cherry Festival) in Nagykörű, the Gulyásfesztivál (Goulash Festival) in Szolnok, the Hídi Vásár (Bridge Fair) in Hortobágy National Park, the Hunniális at Ópusztaszer, the Szabadtéri Játékok (Open-air Theater) in Szeged, the Várjátékok (Castle Games) in Gyula, the Virágkarnevál (Flower Carnival) in Debrecen and the Bajai Halászléfőző Népünnepély (Fisherman's Soup Boiling Festival) in Baja.

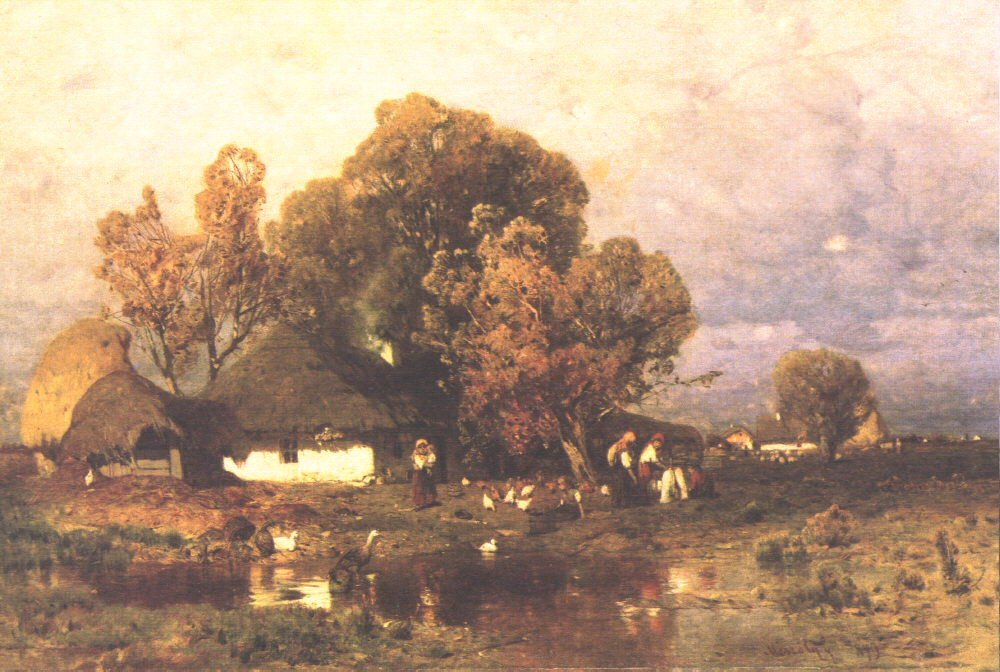
A farm in Great Hungarian Plain, 19th century, by Géza Mészöly

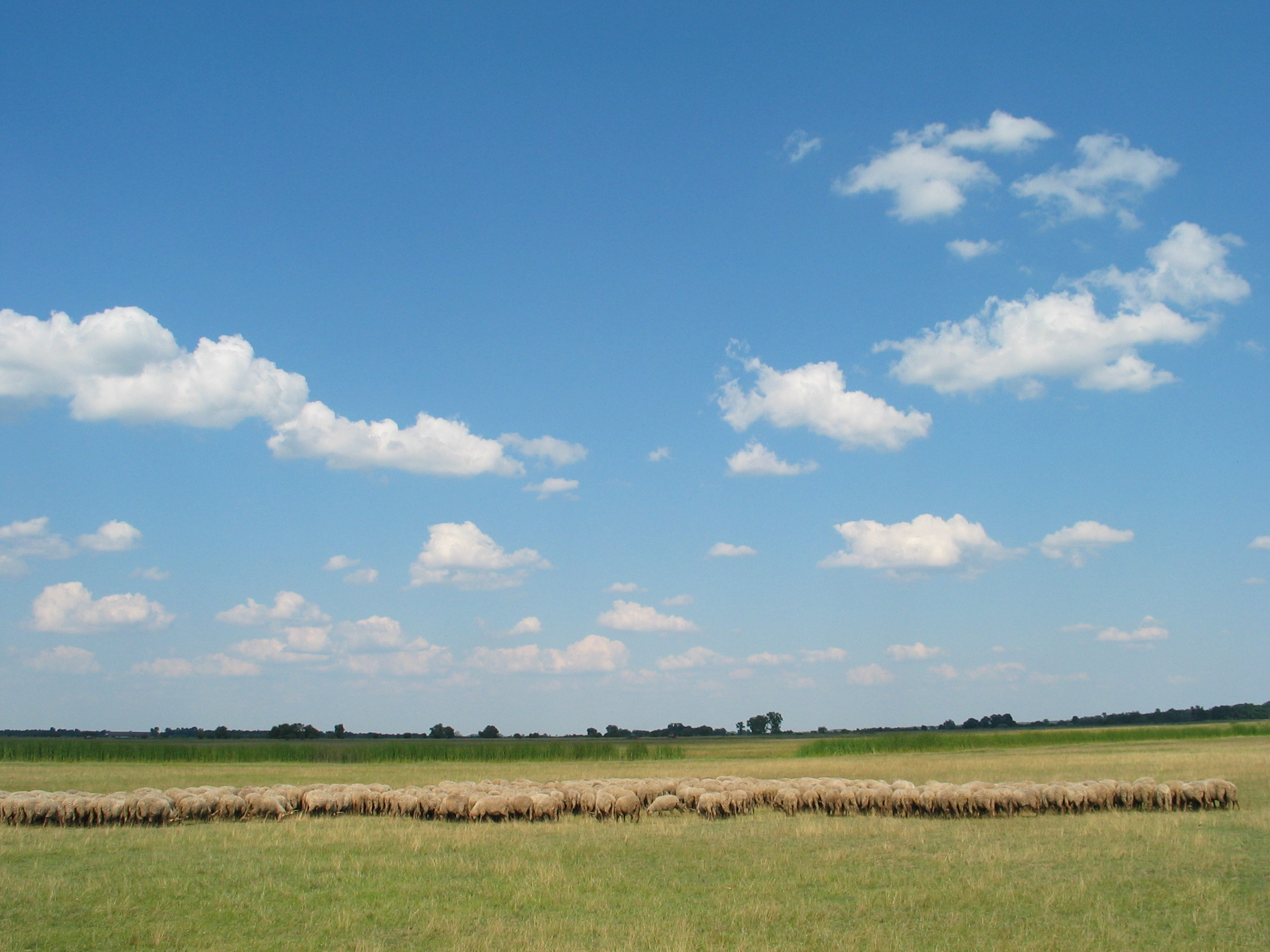
Hortobágy National Park on the Great Hungarian Plain with Racka sheep

The part of the plain located in Hungary comprises the following areas:

- Mezőföld
- Sárrét
- Sárköz
- Drávamellék
- Kiskunság
- Jászság
- Pest Plain
- Heves Plain
- Borsodi-Mezőség
- Bodrogköz
- Tiszahát
- Szatmár Plain
- Maros-Körös köze
- Körös-vidék
- Nagykunság
- Hortobágy National Park
- Hajdúság
- Nyírség

=== Plain in Serbia ===
The term is used in Serbia to denote the Hungarian portion of the Pannonian plain.

The portion of the Pannonian plain in Serbia is mostly divided into 3 large geographical areas: Bačka, Banat and Srem (Syrmia), most of which are located in the Vojvodina province.

=== Plain in Croatia ===
The term is rarely used in Croatia, and is usually associated there with the geography of Hungary.

Parts of Pannonian Croatia can be considered an extension of Alföld, particularly eastern Slavonia and the connected parts of Syrmia.

=== Plain in Slovakia ===
The portion of the plain located in Slovakia is known as the Eastern Slovak Lowland.

=== Plain in Ukraine ===
The part of the plain located in Ukraine is known as the Transcarpathian Lowland.

=== Plain in Romania ===
In Romania, the plain (Rom. câmp or câmpia, from Lat. campus) includes the regions of Banat and Crişana. It is referred to in Romanian as The Western Plain (Câmpia de Vest).

== History ==
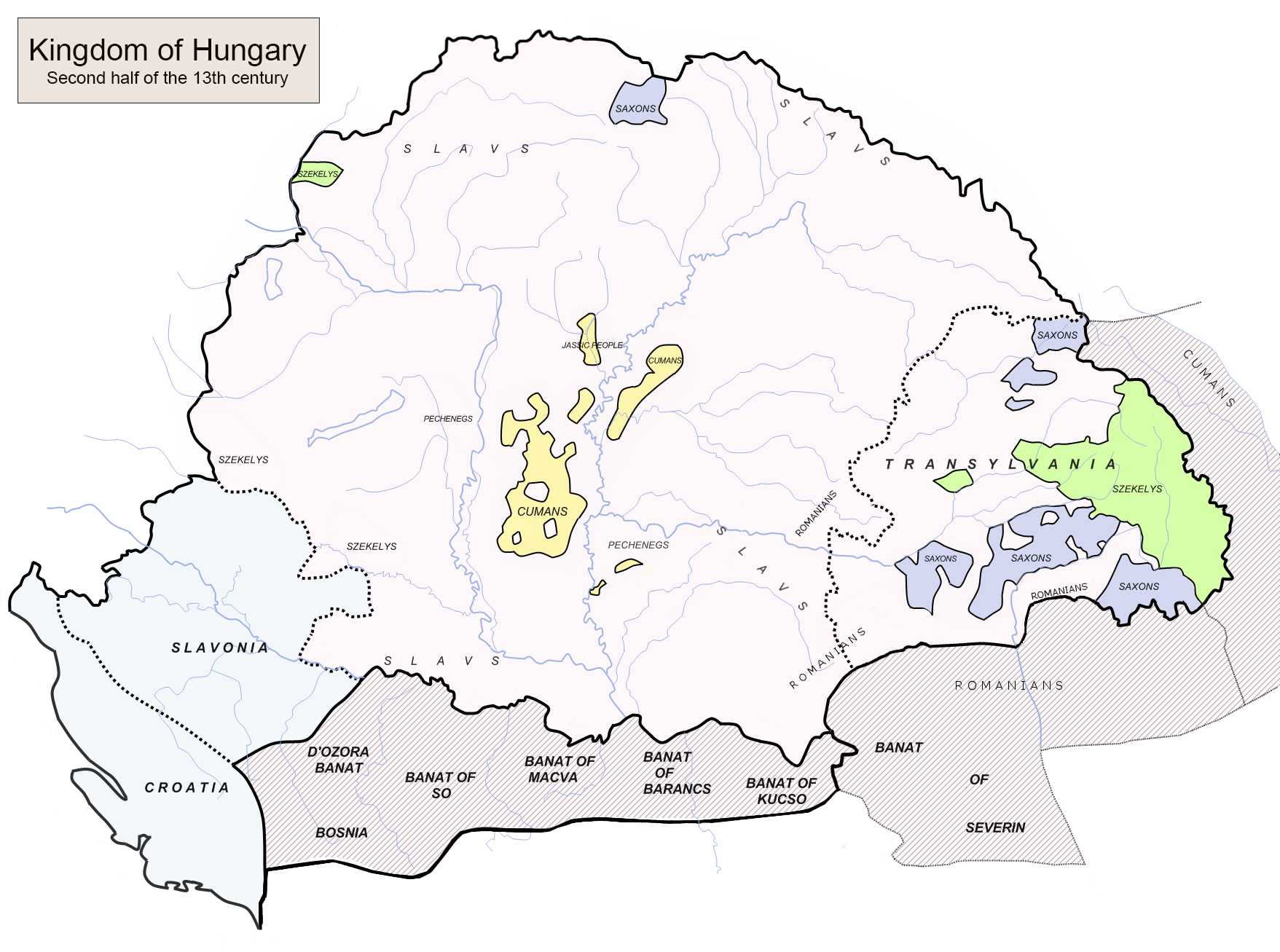
Local autonomies (including Cumania and Jazygia) in the Kingdom of Hungary in late 13th century

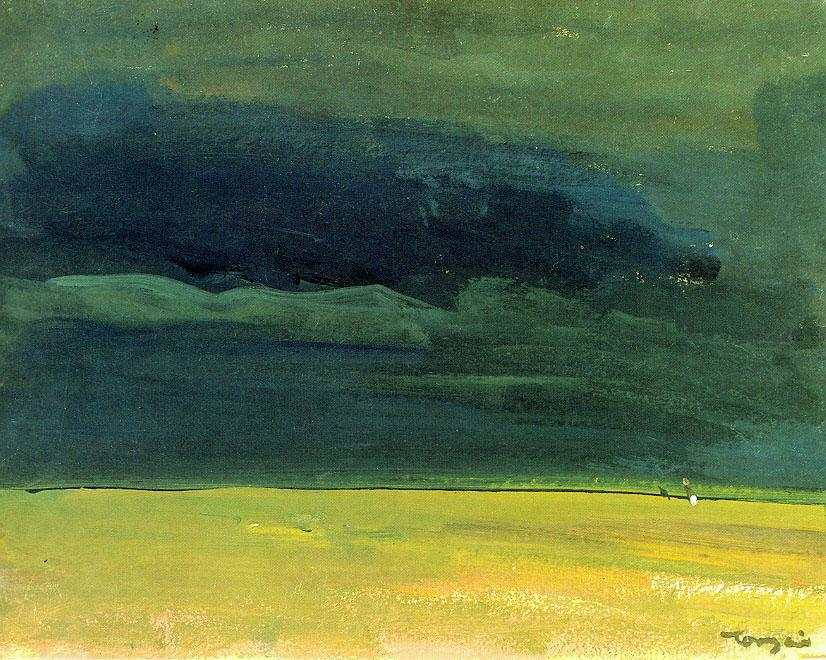
János Tornyai: Clouding over the Great Hungarian Plain

=== Prehistoric culture ===
During the prehistoric era, the Great Hungarian Plain was a place of cultural and technological changes, as well as an important meeting point of cultures of Eastern and Western Europe. It is a region of great archaeological importance to major European cultural transitions.

Agriculture began in the Great Hungarian Plain with the Early Neolithic Körös culture, located in present-day Serbia, 6000–5500 B.C.E. followed 5500 B.C.E. by the Linear Pottery culture (LBK) which later became the dominant agricultural culture of Europe. The LBK was followed by the Lengyel culture in the Late Neolithic 5000–3400 BC.

During the Early Bronze Age (2000–1800 BC), the growing demand for metal ores in Europe resulted in the new pan-European and intercontinental trade networks. During that period cultures of the Great Hungarian Plain incorporated many elements from the other cultures of Bronze Age Near Eastern, Steppe and Central Europe

During the early Iron Age (first millennium BC), a variant of the Central European Hallstatt culture inhabited Transdanubia, while pre-Scythian and later Scythian cultures were found in the eastern region of the Great Hungarian Plain.

In 2014, a major study of DNA from burials in the Great Hungarian Plain was published. The 5,000-year record indicated significant genomic shifts at the beginning of the Neolithic, Bronze and Iron Ages, with periods of stability in between. The earliest Neolithic genome was similar to other European hunter-gatherers and surprisingly there was no evidence of lactase persistence at that period. The most recent samples, from the Iron Age, showed an eastern genomic influence contemporary with introduced Steppe burial rites. There was also a transition towards lighter pigmentation.

=== Nomadic migrations and conquests ===
The Hungarian plain became the heartland of the Eurasian nomads, being in its natural environment similar to the Pontic–Caspian steppe. The plain had formed the base for Huns, Avars, Magyars, Cumans, Jasz people and other nomadic tribes from the Eurasian Steppe.

== See also ==
- Berehove Raion
- Eurasian Steppe
- Little Hungarian Plain
- Pannonian Basin
- Pannonian Steppe
- Steppe Route
- Vienna Basin
