= Gazophylacium Anglicanum =

1689 English dictionary

Gazophylacium Anglicanum is a dictionary of the English language first published anonymously in London in 1689; gazophylacium is a Latin word, borrowed from Ancient Greek γαζοφυλάκιον, meaning thesaurus.

Current scholarship attributes this work to Richard Hogarth and identifies it as a translation of Stephen Skinner's Etymologicon Linguae Anglicanae of 1671. The Gazophylacium Anglicanum was reprinted in 1691 as A New English Dictionary.

== Full title ==
"Gazophylacium Anglicanum – containing the derivation of English words, proper and common, each in an alphabet distinct : proving the Dutch and Saxon to be the prime fountains : and likewise giving the similar words in most European languages, whereby any of them may be indifferently well learned, and understood : fitted to the capacity of the English reader, that may be curious to know the original of his mother-tongue"

== See also ==
- Catholicon Anglicum
