= Tourkia =

Tourkia (Greek: Τουρκία) may refer to:

- Turkey, a country in southeastern Europe and western Asia
  - The name of Turkey in modern Greek
  - The name of the Ottoman Empire in medieval and early modern Greek
- Tourkia (Khazaria) ("eastern Tourkia"), designation for the early medieval Khazar state in Byzantine sources
- Tourkia (Hungary) ("western Tourkia"), designation for the medieval Hungarian state in Byzantine sources

== See also ==
- Name of Turkey
- Turkey (disambiguation)
