= List of domesticated animals from Hungary =

The Hungarian breeds of domestic animals are often seen as national symbols in Hungary.

In 2004, the Hungarian Parliament adopted a resolution declaring protected indigenous or endangered Hungarian livestock breeds with high genetic value as National Teasures. The resolution lists a total of 105 protected indigenous or endangered Hungarian domesticated animal breeds as National Treasures, including 3 cattle breeds, 5 sheep breeds, 1 goat breed, 3 pig breeds, 5 chicken breeds, 2 turkey breeds, 2 goose breeds, 1 duck breed, 1 guinea fowl breed, 1 rabbit breed, 8 horse breeds, 1 donkey breed, 29 fish species (including 26 carp varieties), 9 dog breeds, and 34 pigeon breeds.

== Dogs ==
=== Hunting dogs ===
Image	Animal	Description
	Hungarian Vizsla	One of the oldest hunting dogs of the world. The ancestors of this dog came into the Carpathian Basin with the nomadic Hungarian tribes.
	Hungarian Wirehaired Vizsla	A Hungarian breed of pointer dog.
	Transylvanian Hound	A Hungarian breed of scent hound used primarily for hunting. It originated from Transylvania, a historical region of the former Kingdom of Hungary.
	Magyar Agár	It is a type of sighthound originating from Hungary.

=== Guard and shepherd dogs ===
Image	Animal	Description
	Hungarian Puli	A small-medium breed of Hungarian herding dog known for its long, corded coat.
	Hungarian Komondor	A large white-colored Hungarian breed of livestock guardian dog with a long, corded coat, was brought to Hungary by nomadic Magyars or by the Cumans.
	Hungarian Kuvasz	A large Hungarian breed of flock guardian dog. Mention of the breed can be found in old Hungarian texts. They have historically been royal guard dogs, or guarded livestock.
	Hungarian Pumi	A medium-small breed of sheep dog from Hungary.
	Hungarian Mudi	A herding dog breed from Hungary.

- Sinka

== Livestock ==
=== Cattle ===
Image	Animal	Description
	Hungarian Grey Cattle	A Hungarian breed of beef cattle, characterised by long lyre-shaped horns and a pale grey coat. It is well adapted to extensive pasture systems and was formerly raised in very large numbers in the Hungarian puszta.

=== Horses ===
Image	Animal	Description
	Gidran	A horse breed developed in Hungary from bloodstock that included the Arabian horse.

- Nóniusz horse

=== Pigs ===
Image	Animal	Description
	Mangalica	A breed of pigs, characterised by their long curly hair and relatively fatty meat which makes them ideal for making sausages and salami.

=== Sheep ===
- Racka - a breed of sheep with distinctive horns.
- Cikta sheep

== See also ==
- List of mammals of Hungary
- National symbols of Hungary
