= Turchia =

Turchia may be:

- the Italian name of Turkey
- the Khazar Empire
- the Seljuk Empire
- the Ottoman Empire

== See also ==
- Name of Turkey
- Tartary
