= Richard Huloet =

Richard Huloet was a 16th-century English lexicographer. He was born at Wisbech, Isle of Ely, Cambridgeshire. He was a contemporary of Peter Levens, John Withals, and John Véron.

According to some sources, Samuel Johnson and he were the first writers in the English language to use the term "honeymoon". He was the author of the Abecedarium Anglico-Latinum (1552). The book was dedicated to Thomas Goodrich, Bishop of Ely and chancellor of England.
