= John Withals =

John Withals (d. circa 1555) was an English lexicographer. Withals was born and raised in London. Originally a schoolmaster, he was a contemporary of Peter Levens and Richard Huloet.

Withals was the author of one of the first English-Latin vocabularies for children. In 1556, he published A Short Dictionary for Young Beginners.
