= Promptorium parvulorum =

Oldest English-to-Latin dictionary

- Author: Attributed to Geoffrey the Grammarian
- Language: Latin, Middle English
- Subject: Bilingual dictionary
- Publication place: England

The Promptorium parvulorum (Latin: "Storehouse for children") is an English-Latin bilingual dictionary completed around 1440. It was the first English-to-Latin dictionary. It occupies about 300 printed book pages.

The authorship is attributed to Geoffrey the Grammarian, a friar who lived in Lynn, Norfolk, England. After the invention of the printing press, the Promptorium was repeatedly published in the early 16th century by the printer Wynkyn de Worde. In the 19th century, the Camden Society republished it under the extended title Promptorium parvulorum sive clericorum (“Storehouse for children or clerics”).

For language historians it is a major reference work for the vocabulary of late medieval English. It is also a frequently cited source in the Middle English Dictionary, the primary dictionary of late medieval English, published by the University of Michigan.

== See also ==
- Catholicon Anglicum, an English-to-Latin dictionary dated 1485
