= Peter Levens =

English lexicographer

Peter Levens (1552-1587) was an English lexicographer. He was born in Yorkshire, and attended Magdalen College. He received his bachelor's and master's degrees from Oxford University.

He was a contemporary of John Withals, Richard Huloet, and John Veron. He is most famous for being the author of the Manipulus Vocabulorum.
