= Hungarians =

Hungarians Magyars
magyarok

Total population
- c. 14.5 million

Regions with significant populations
- Hungary: 9,632,744; Pannonian Basin: 11,425,000 (2022)
- Other countries
Europe
Romania	1,002,151
Slovakia	456,154
Germany	296,000
Serbia	184,442
France	200,000–250,000
United Kingdom	200,000–220,000
Ukraine	156,566
Austria	73,411
Russia	55,500
Switzerland	27,000
Netherlands	26,172
Czech Republic	20,000
Belgium	15,000
Croatia	14,048
Italy	13,588
Sweden	13,000
Slovenia	10,500
Spain	10,000
Ireland	9,000
Norway	8,316
Denmark	6,000
Bosnia and Herzegovina	4,000
Finland	3,000
Greece	2,000
Luxembourg	2,000
Poland	1,728
Portugal	1,692
North America
United States	1,437,694
Canada	348,085
Mexico	3,500
South America
Brazil	80,000
Chile	50,000
Argentina	40,000–50,000
Venezuela	4,000
Uruguay	3,000
Rest of the world
Israel	200,000
Australia	69,167
New Zealand	7,000
Turkey	6,800
South Africa	4,000
Jordan	1,000

Languages
- Hungarian

Religion
- Majority: Christianity (Roman Catholicism, Protestantism, Greek Catholicism, Eastern Orthodoxy, Unitarianism); Minority: Islam, irreligious

- Person: Magyar
- People: Magyarok
- Language: Magyar nyelv, Magyar jelnyelv
- Country: Magyarország

Hungarians, also known as Magyars, (Note: /ˈmæɡjɑːrz/ MAG-yarz; Hungarian: magyarok [ˈmɒɟɒrok]) are an ethnic group native to present day Hungary (Magyarország), and the Carpathian Basin who share a common culture, language, history and ancestry. They have a notable presence in parts of the former Kingdom of Hungary. The Hungarian language belongs to the Ugric branch of the Uralic language family, alongside the Khanty and Mansi languages.

There are an estimated 14.5 million ethnic Hungarians and their descendants worldwide, of whom approximately 9.6 million live in today's Hungary. About 2 million Hungarians live in areas that were part of the Kingdom of Hungary before the Treaty of Trianon in 1920 and are now parts of Hungary's seven neighbouring countries, Slovakia, Ukraine, Romania, Serbia, Croatia, Slovenia, and Austria. In addition, significant groups of people with Hungarian ancestry live in various other parts of the world, most of them in the United States, Canada, Germany, France, the United Kingdom, Chile, Brazil, Australia, and Argentina; therefore, they constitute the Hungarian diaspora (Hungarian: szórványmagyarság).

The diaspora can be divided into several subgroups according to local linguistic and cultural characteristics; subgroups include the Székelys (in eastern Transylvania as well as a few in Suceava County, Bukovina), the Csángós (in Western Moldavia), the Palóc, the Matyó and the Magyarabs (in Nubia).

== Name ==
The Hungarians' own ethnonym to denote themselves in the Early Middle Ages is uncertain. The exonym "Hungarian" is believed to have derived from the Huns and the Oghur-Turkic Onoğur (literally "Ten Arrows" or "Ten Tribes").

Prior to the Hungarian conquest of the Carpathian Basin when the Hungarian conquerors lived east of the Carpathian Mountains, on the Pontic-Caspian Steppe, written sources called the Hungarians: "Ungri" by Georgius Monachus in 837, "Ungri" by Annales Bertiniani in 862, and "Ungari" by the Annales ex Annalibus Iuvavensibus in 881. The Hungarians probably belonged to the Onoğur tribal alliance, and it is possible that they became its ethnic majority. In the Early Middle Ages, the Hungarians had many names, including "Węgrzy" (Polish), "Ungherese" (Italian), "Ungar" (German), and "Hungarus".

In their own language, the Hungarian people call themselves "Magyar". "Magyar" possibly derived from the name of the most prominent Hungarian tribe, the "Megyer". The tribal name "Megyer" became "Magyar" in reference to the Hungarian people as a whole.

The Greek cognate of "Tourkia" (Greek: Τουρκία) was used by the scholar and Byzantine Emperor Constantine VII Porphyrogenitus in his De Administrando Imperio of c. AD 950, though in his use, "Turks" always referred to Magyars. However, although the Magyars’ historical social structure was of Turkic origin, and they still retain substantial Turkic roots in their basic vocabulary and certain early Turkic cultural elements, they are not widely considered a Turkic people today.

The obscure name kerel or keral, found in the 13th-century work The Secret History of the Mongols, possibly referred to Hungarians and derived from the Hungarian title király ('king').

The historical Latin phrase "Natio Hungarica" ("Hungarian nation") had a wider and political meaning because it once referred to all nobles of the Kingdom of Hungary, regardless of their ethnicity or mother tongue.

== History ==
=== Origin ===
The origin of Hungarians, the place and time of their ethnogenesis, has been a matter of debate. Due to the classification of the Hungarian language in the Ugric family, they are sometimes regarded as an Ugric people originating in Siberia. However, Fóthi et al. 2022 suggests that the conquering Hungarians have origins in three distinct regions on the Eurasian steppe: the Lake Baikal-Altai Mountains, spanning present-day northwestern Mongolia and southern Siberia, the Southern Urals-Western Siberia and the Black Sea-Northern Caucasus. Meanwhile, Neparáczki et al. 2018 proposes that over a third of the Hungarian conquerors' maternal lineages derive from Inner Asia, centred in present-day eastern Mongolia and southern Siberia, while the remainder is derived from the Pontic-Caspian Steppe. Maróti et al. 2022 highlights the arrival of three successive tribes in the Carpathian Basin between the 5th and 9th centuries, the Huns, Avars and conquering Hungarians. The study concludes that the Huns and related Avars likely originated in present-day Mongolia and were descendants of the Xiongnu, while the conquering Hungarians derived from an admixture of Ugrians, Sarmatians and Huns.

"Hungarian pre-history", i.e. the history of the "ancient Hungarians" before their arrival in the Carpathian basin at the end of the 9th century, is thus a "tenuous construct", based on linguistics, analogies in folklore, archaeology and subsequent written evidence. In the 21st century, historians have argued that "Hungarians" did not exist as a discrete ethnic group or people for centuries before their settlement in the Carpathian basin. Instead, the formation of the people with its distinct identity was a process. According to this view, Hungarians as a people emerged by the 9th century, subsequently incorporating other, ethnically and linguistically divergent, peoples.

=== Pre-4th century AD ===
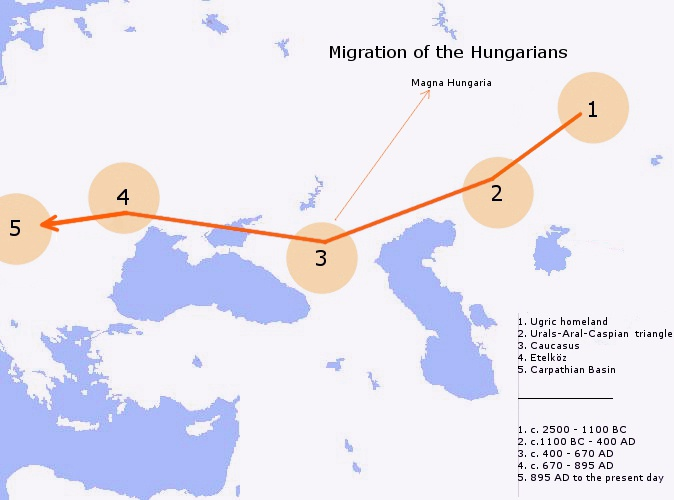
Map of the presumptive Hungarian prehistory

During the 4th-3rd millennium BC, the Uralic-speaking peoples in Siberia began to split up. Some dispersed towards the west and came into contact with Turkic- and Iranic-speaking peoples who were spreading northwards. From at least 2000 BC onwards, Ugric-speakers became distinguished from the rest of the Uralic-speaking peoples. Judging by evidence from burial mounds and settlement sites, they interacted with the Indo-Iranian Andronovo culture and Baikal-Altai Asian cultures.

=== 4th century to c. 830 ===
In the 4th and 5th centuries AD, Ugric-speakers moved to the west of the Ural Mountains, to the area between the southern Ural Mountains and the Volga River, known as Bashkiria (Bashkortostan) and Perm Krai.

Oghuric-speaking peoples from Inner Asia migrated to the Pontic-Caspian steppe around the mid-5th century.

In the early 8th century, some Ugric-speakers moved to the Don River, to an area between the Volga, Don and the Seversky Donets rivers. Those around the Don River were subordinates of the Khazar Khaganate.

Tradition holds that the Hungarians were organized in a confederacy of seven tribes: Jenő, Kér, Keszi, Kürt-Gyarmat, Megyer, Nyék, and Tarján. Most of the tribal names are believed to be of Turkic origin. The Hungarians neighboured the Oghuric Bulgars on the Pontic-Caspian Steppe, with cooperation in gardening, cattle breeding and agriculture.

=== c. 830 to c. 895 ===
Around 830, a rebellion broke out in the Khazar khaganate. As a result, three Kabar tribes of the Khazars joined the Hungarians and moved to what the Hungarians call the Etelköz, the territory between the Carpathians and the Dnieper River. The Hungarians faced their first attack by the Pechenegs around 854. The new neighbours of the Hungarians were the Varangians and the eastern Slavs. From 862 onwards, the Hungarians (already referred to as the Ungri) along with their allies, the Kabars, started a series of looting raids from the Etelköz into the Carpathian Basin, against Great Moravia, the Eastern Frankish Empire, the First Bulgarian Empire, and the Balaton principality.

=== Entering the Carpathian Basin (c. 862–895) ===
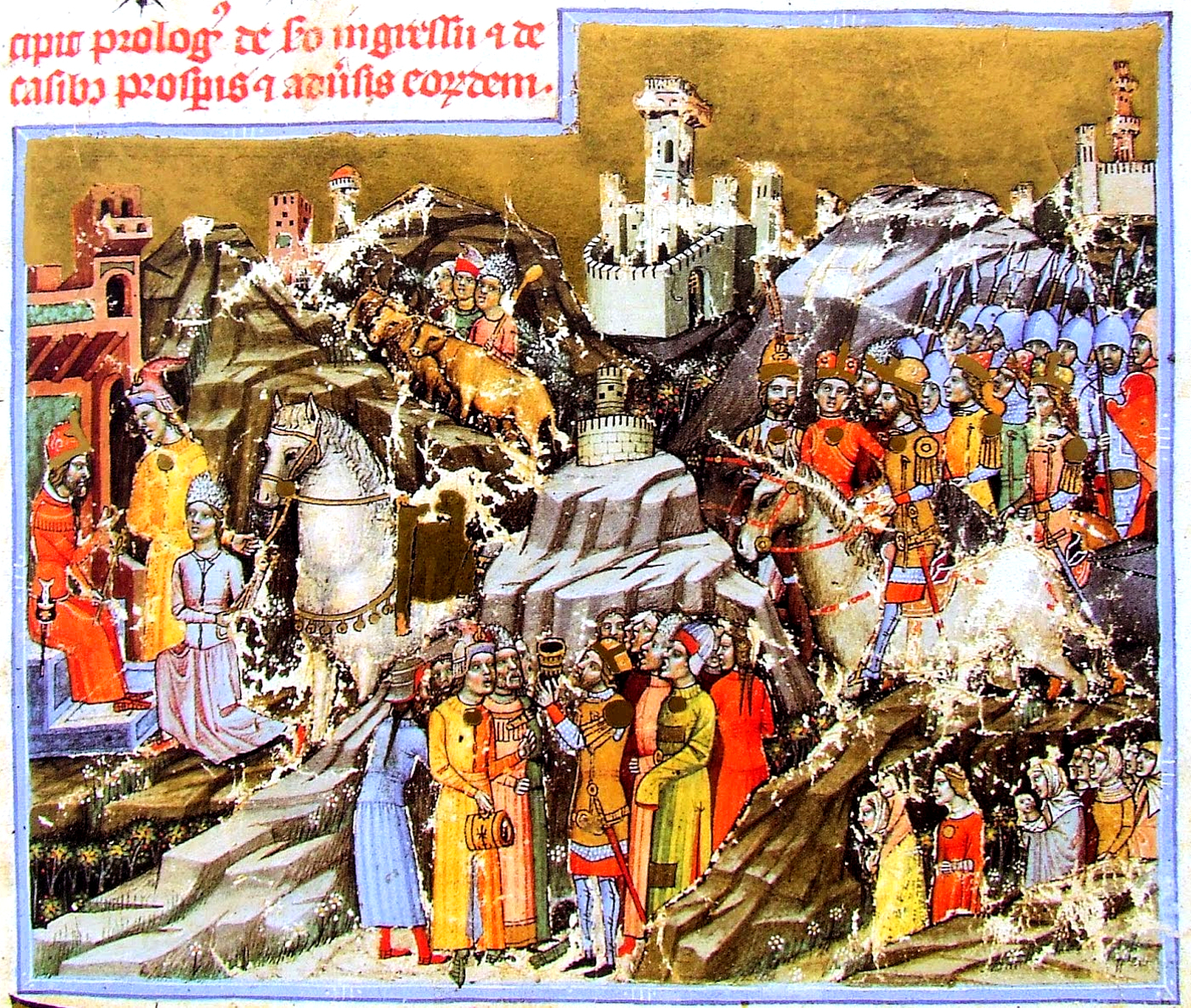
Hungarian conquest of the Carpathian Basin (Chronicon Pictum, 1358)

The Hungarians arrived in the Carpathian Basin, a geographically unified but politically divided land, after acquiring thorough local knowledge of the area from the 860s onwards.

After the end of the Avar Kaganate (c. 822), the Eastern Franks asserted their influence in Transdanubia, the Bulgarians to a small extent in the Southern Transylvania and the interior regions housed the surviving Avar population in their stateless state. The downfall of the Avar Khaganate at the beginning of the 9th century did not mean the extinction of the Avar population, contemporary written sources report surviving Avar groups. According to the archaeological evidence, the Avar population survived the time of the Hungarian conquest of the Carpathian Basin.

In 862, Prince Rastislav of Moravia rebelled against the Franks, and after hiring Hungarian troops, won his independence; this was the first time that Hungarians expeditionary troops entered the Carpathian Basin. In 862, Archbishop Hincmar of Reims records the campaign of unknown enemies called "Ungri", giving the first mention of the Hungarians in Western Europe. In 881, the Hungarian forces fought together with the Kabars in the Vienna Basin. According to historian György Szabados and archaeologist Miklós Béla Szőke, a group of Hungarians were already living in the Carpathian Basin at that time, so they could quickly intervene in the events of the Carolingian Empire. The number of recorded battles increased from the end of the 9th century. In the late Avar period, a part of Hungarians was already present in the Carpathian Basin in the 9th century, this has been supported by genetic and archaeological research, because there are graves in which Avar descendants are buried in Hungarian clothes. An important segment of this Avar era Hungarians is that the Hungarian county system of King Saint Stephen I may be largely based on the power centers formed during the Avar period. According to some genetic studies, there is a genetic continuity from the Bronze Age, a continuous migration of the Steppe peoples from east of the Carpathian Basin.

The foundation of the Hungarian state is connected to the Hungarian conquerors, who arrived from the Pontic steppes as a confederation of seven tribes. The Hungarians arrived in the frame of a strong centralized steppe-empire under the leadership of Grand Prince Álmos and his son Árpád, they became founders of the Árpád dynasty, the Hungarian ruling dynasty and the Hungarian state. The Árpád dynasty claimed to be a direct descendant of the great Hun leader Attila. Medieval Hungarian chronicles from the Hungarian royal court like the Gesta Hungarorum, Gesta Hunnorum et Hungarorum, Chronicon Pictum, Buda Chronicle, Chronica Hungarorum claimed that the Árpád dynasty and the Aba clan are the descendants of Attila.

Árpád, Grand Prince of the Hungarians, says in the Gesta Hungarorum:

The land stretching between the Danube and the Tisza used to belong to my forefather, the mighty Attila.

— Anonymus: Gesta Hungarorum

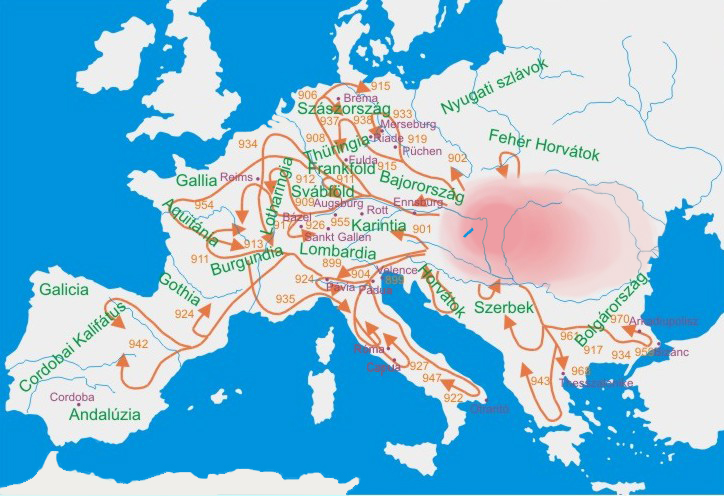
Hungarian raids in the 9–10th century

The Hungarians took possession of the Carpathian Basin in a pre-planned manner, with a long move-in between 862 and 895. This is confirmed by the archaeological findings. In the 10th-century Hungarian cemeteries, the graves of women, children and elderly people are located next to the warriors. They were buried according to the same traditions, wore the same style of ornaments, and belonged to the same anthropological group. The Hungarian military events of the following years prove that the Hungarian population that settled in the Carpathian Basin was not a weakened population without a significant military power. Other theories assert that the move of the Hungarians was forced or at least hastened by the joint attacks of Pechenegs and Bulgarians. According to eleventh-century tradition, the road taken by the Hungarians under Prince Álmos took them first to Transylvania in 895. This is supported by an eleventh-century Russian tradition that the Hungarians moved to the Carpathian Basin by way of Kiev. Prince Álmos, the sacred leader of the Hungarian Great Principality died before he could reach Pannonia, he was sacrificed in Transylvania.

In 895/896, under the leadership of Árpád, some Hungarians crossed the Carpathians and entered the Carpathian Basin. The tribe called Megyer was the leading tribe of the Hungarian alliance that conquered the centre of the basin. At the same time (c. 895), due to their involvement in the 894–896 Bulgaro-Byzantine war, Hungarians in Etelköz were attacked by Bulgaria and then by their old enemies the Pechenegs. The Bulgarians won the decisive battle of Southern Buh. It is uncertain whether or not those conflicts contributed to the Hungarian departure from Etelköz.

From the upper Tisza region of the Carpathian Basin, the Hungarians intensified their campaigns across continental Europe. In 900, they moved from the upper Tisza river to Transdanubia, which later became the core of the arising Hungarian state. By 902, the borders were pushed to the South-Moravian Carpathians and the Principality of Moravia collapsed. At the time of the Hungarian migration, the land was inhabited only by a sparse population of Slavs, numbering about 200,000, who were either assimilated or enslaved by the Hungarians.

Archaeological findings (e.g. in the Polish city of Przemyśl) suggest that many Hungarians remained to the north of the Carpathians after 895/896. There is also a consistent Hungarian population in Transylvania, the Székelys, who comprise 40% of the Hungarians in Romania. The Székely people's origin, and in particular the time of their settlement in Transylvania, is a matter of historical controversy.

=== After 900 ===
In 907, the Hungarians destroyed a Bavarian army in the Battle of Pressburg and laid the territories of present-day Germany, France, and Italy open to Hungarian raids, which were fast and devastating. The Hungarians defeated the Imperial Army of Louis the Child, son of Arnulf of Carinthia and last legitimate descendant of the German branch of the house of Charlemagne, near Augsburg in 910. From 917 to 925, Hungarians raided through Basel, Alsace, Burgundy, Saxony, and Provence. Hungarian expansion was checked at the Battle of Lechfeld in 955, ending their raids against Western Europe, but raids on the Balkan Peninsula continued until 970.

The Pope approved Hungarian settlement in the area when their leaders converted to Christianity, and Stephen I (Szent István, or Saint Stephen) was crowned King of Hungary in 1001. The century between the arrival of the Hungarians from the eastern European plains and the consolidation of the Kingdom of Hungary in 1001 was dominated by pillaging campaigns across Europe, from Dania (Denmark) to the Iberian Peninsula (contemporary Spain and Portugal). After the acceptance of the nation into Christian Europe under Stephen I, Hungary served as a bulwark against further invasions from the east and south, especially by the Turks.

At this time, the Hungarian nation numbered around 400,000 people.

=== Ottoman period ===
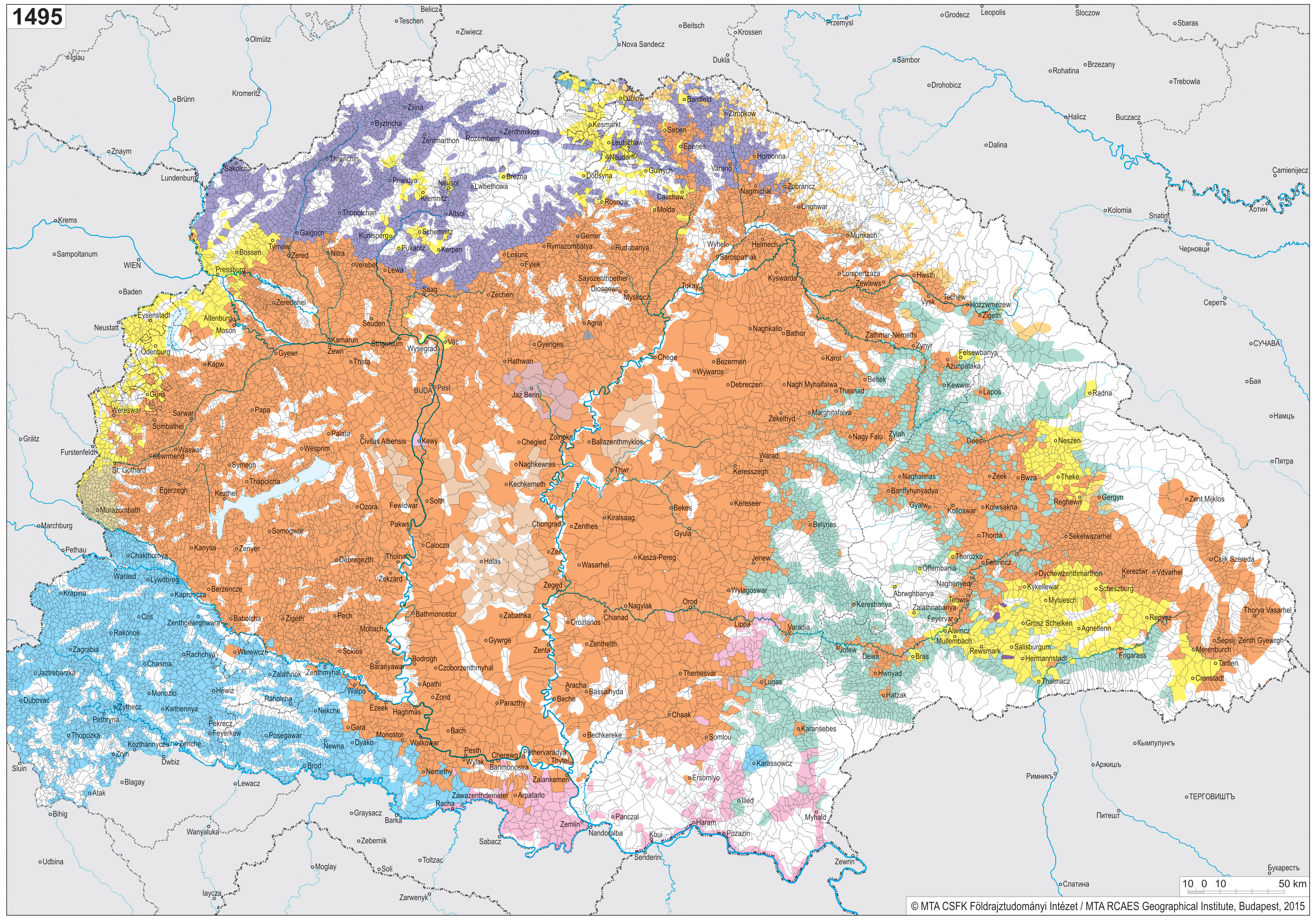

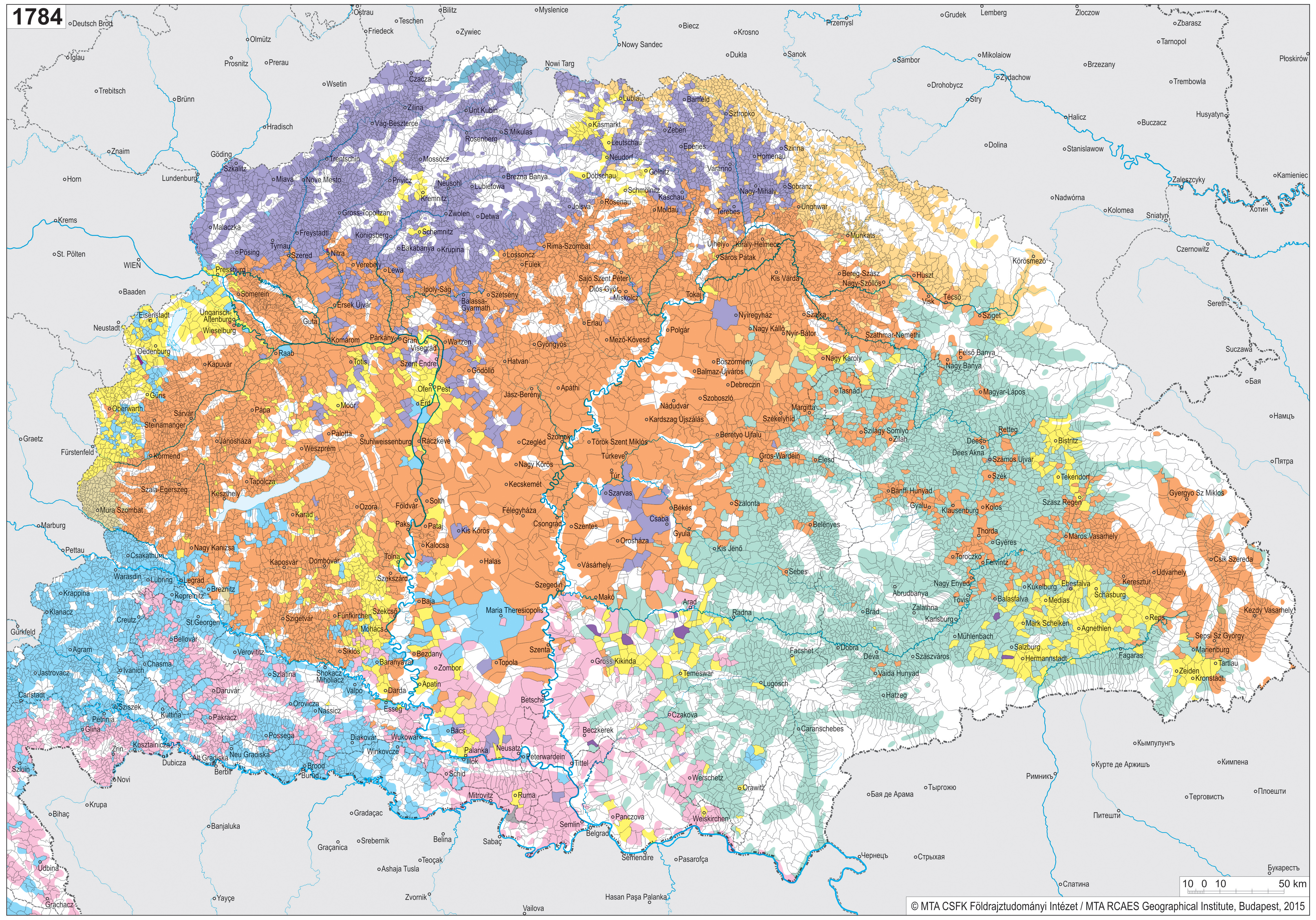
Estimated ethnic maps of the Kingdom of Hungary in 1495 (before Ottoman rule) and in 1784 (decades after Ottoman rule) by the Hungarian Academy of Sciences, based on research from Hungarian scholars. Hungarians are depicted in orange, the ethnic pattern of Hungary changed due to the centuries long wars and migration movements. The date 1495 is based on a nationwide registry conducted in the Kingdom of Hungary by commission of the royal treasury. The 1495 map shows the estimated absolute or relative linguistic majority of the local population based on the family names of taxpayers recorded in national or domanial registers, the linguistic analysis of the names of geographic objects and on various scholarly sources. The date 1784 is based a census of Joseph II. The 1784 map show the estimate of linguistic majorities at settlement level on the basis of ecclesiastical registers, gazetteers and monographs, which also contained contemporary language and religious data.

The Magyarab people are a small Magyar (Hungarian) community living within Nubia, along the Nile in Sudan and Egypt. They have distant Hungarian ancestors who intermarried with locals. The Ottoman Empire had to recruit troops from conquered Christian people, most notably through the devşirme system, a special "tribute in blood", by which the Janissary corps was primarily staffed. In this system, Christian youths were taken, or children were kidnapped during Ottoman raids, primarily from the Balkan provinces, then converted to Islam and drafted into Ottoman service. The Hungarian population experienced the recruitment of its people under the Ottoman regime. The Hungarians who were relocated from Hungary to the banks of the Nile were soldiers in the Ottoman army, brought there by Sultan Selim to serve as border guards. These groups of Hungarians ended up in Egypt-Sudan after retiring from military service, concluding their army careers there.

In the 16th and 17th centuries, the Ottoman conquest turned the Kingdom of Hungary into a battlefield. According to Hungarian historiography, the ethnic pattern of Hungary changed significantly due to the century's long wars. During the Ottoman occupation, the Principality of Transylvania maintained the continuity of Hungarian statehood. The Habsburg–Wallachian military campaigns between 1599 and 1604, and Ottoman–Tatar military campaigns between 1657 and 1661 were destructive for the Hungarians living in the region and the Hungarian settlements connecting the Hungarian ethnic blocks of the Partium and Székely Land suffered the most extensive destruction. Between the Battle of Mohács in 1526 and the suppression of Rákóczi's War of Independence in 1711, the Hungarian and Catholic dominated population structure of the Late Medieval Kingdom of Hungary was broken up, in Transylvania the Romanians became majority and the Hungarians became a minority population, and in the more sheltered mountainous regions, the Romanian population steadily grew, benefiting from additional immigration from Wallachia and Moldavia.

=== Early modern period ===
The first accurate measurements of the population of the Kingdom of Hungary including ethnic composition were carried out in 1850–51. There is a debate among Hungarian and non-Hungarian (especially Slovak and Romanian) historians about the possible changes in the ethnic structure of the region throughout history. According to Hungarian historians, the proportion of Hungarians in the Carpathian Basin was at an almost constant 80% during the Middle Ages. The Hungarian population began to decrease only at the time of the Ottoman conquest, reaching as low as around 39% by the end of the 18th century.

The decline of the Hungarians was due to the constant wars, Ottoman raids, famines, and plagues during the 150 years of Ottoman rule. The main zones of war were the territories inhabited by the Hungarians, so the death toll depleted them at a much higher rate than among other nationalities. In the 18th century, their proportion declined further because of the influx of new settlers from Europe, especially Slovaks, Serbs and Germans. In 1715 (after the Ottoman occupation), the Southern Great Plain was nearly uninhabited but now has 1.3 million inhabitants, nearly all of them Hungarians. As a consequence, having also the Habsburg colonization policies, the country underwent a great change in ethnic composition as its population more than tripled to 8 million between 1720 and 1787, while only 39% of its people were Hungarians, who lived primarily in the centre of the country.

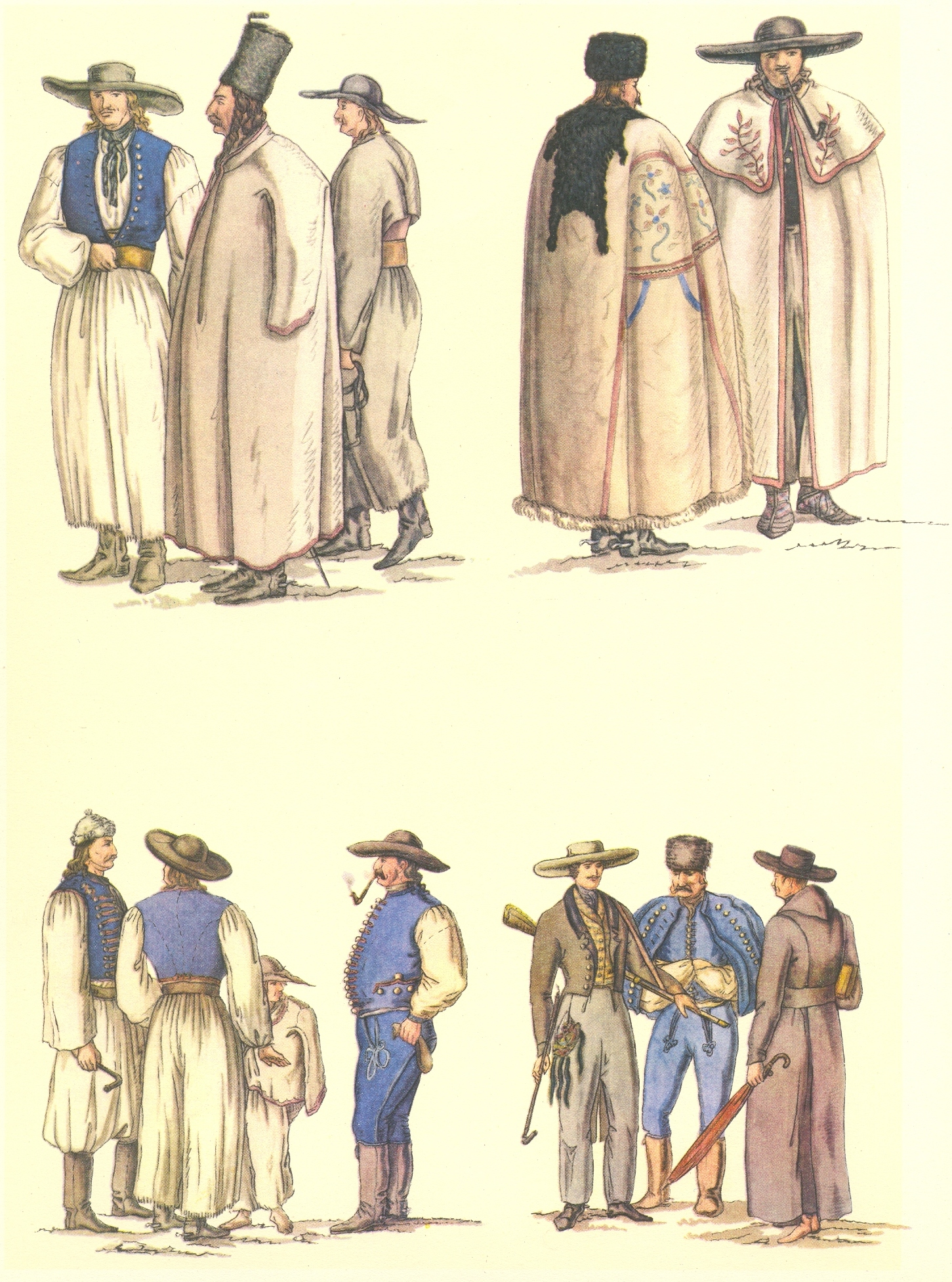
Traditional Hungarian costumes from Jassic- Cuman area, 1822

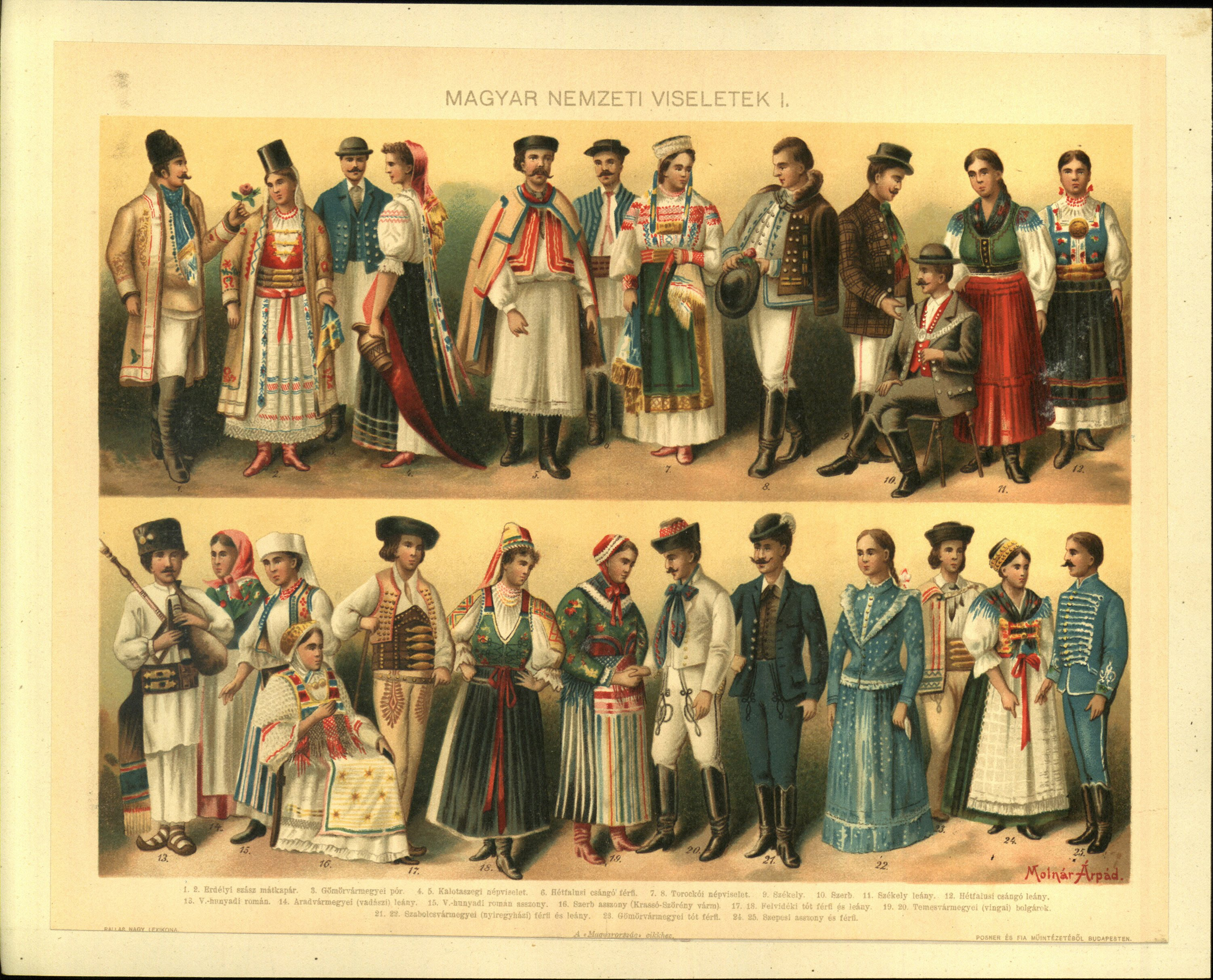
Traditional clothing in Hungary, around late 18th century and early 19th century

=== 19th century to present ===
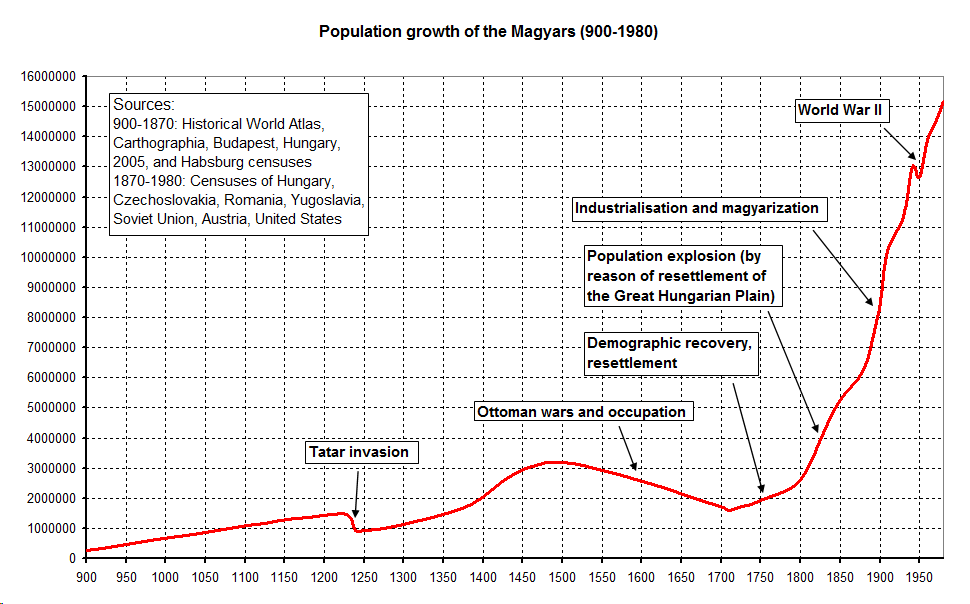
Population growth of Hungarians (900–1980)

In the 19th century, the proportion of Hungarians in the Kingdom of Hungary rose gradually, reaching over 50% by 1900 due to higher natural growth and Magyarization. Between 1787 and 1910 the number of ethnic Hungarians rose from 2.3 million to 10.2 million, accompanied by the resettlement of the Great Hungarian Plain and Délvidék by mainly Roman Catholic Hungarian settlers from the northern and western counties of the Kingdom of Hungary. Spontaneous assimilation was an important factor, especially among the German and Jewish minorities and the citizens of the bigger towns. On the other hand, about 1.5 million people (about two-thirds non-Hungarian) left the Kingdom of Hungary between 1890–1910 to escape from poverty.

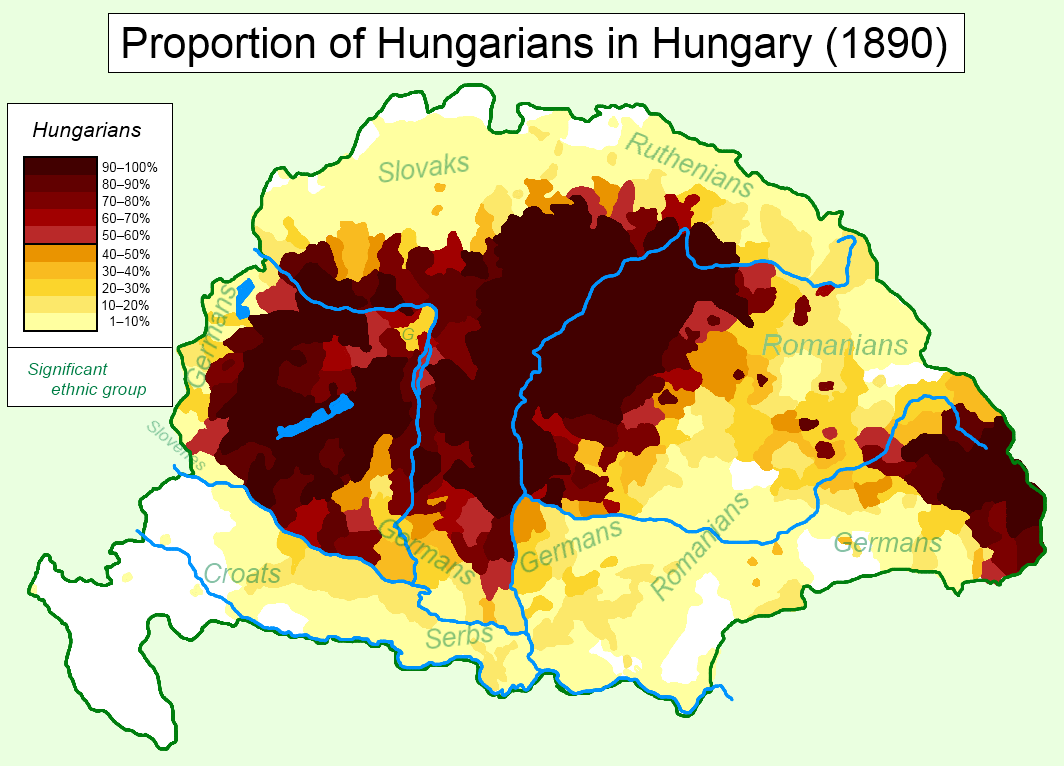
Magyars (Hungarians) in Hungary, 1890 census

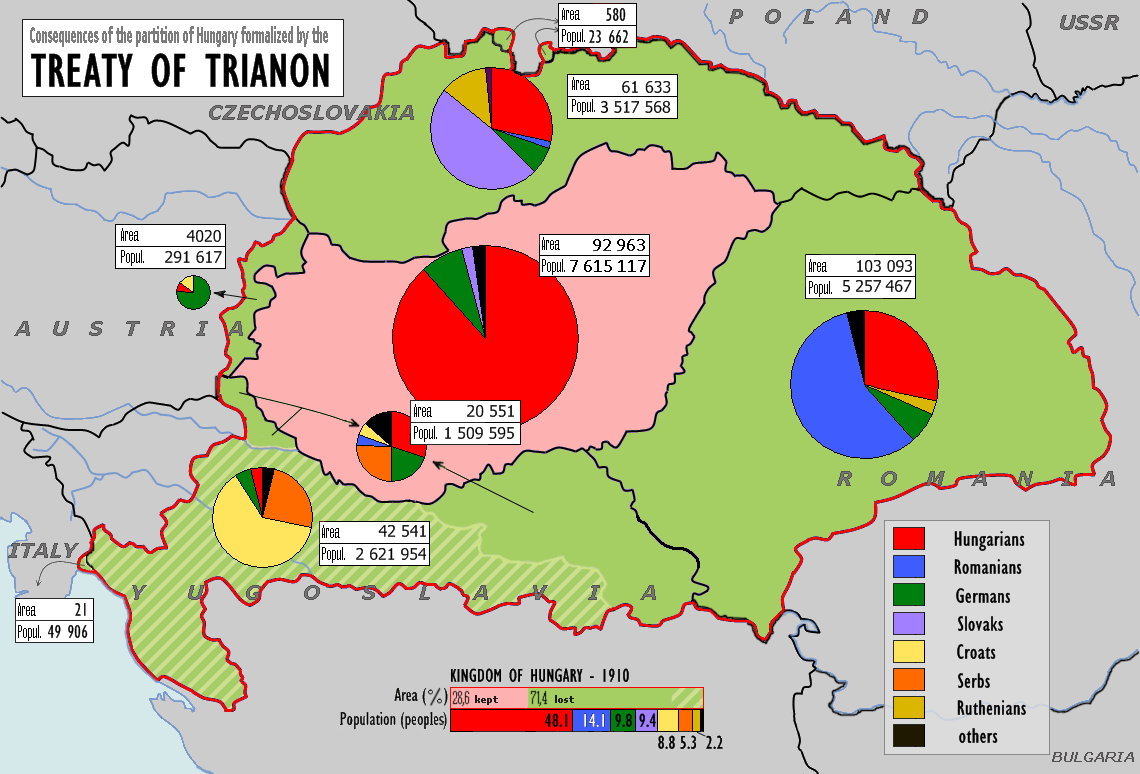
The Treaty of Trianon: Kingdom of Hungary lost 72% of its land and 3.3 million people of Hungarian ethnicity.

The years 1918 to 1920 were a turning point in the Hungarians' history. By the Treaty of Trianon, the Kingdom had been cut into several parts, leaving only a quarter of its original size. One-third of the Hungarians became minorities in the neighbouring countries. During the remainder of the 20th century, the Hungarians population of Hungary grew from 7.1 million (1920) to around 10.4 million (1980), despite losses during the Second World War and the wave of emigration after the attempted revolution in 1956.

The number of Hungarians in the neighbouring countries tended to remain the same or slightly decreased, mostly due to assimilation (sometimes forced; see Slovakization and Romanianization) and to emigration to Hungary (in the 1990s, especially from Transylvania and Vojvodina). After the "baby boom" of the 1950s (Ratkó era), a serious demographic crisis began to develop in Hungary and its neighbours. The Hungarian population reached its maximum in 1980, then began to decline.

For historical reasons (see Treaty of Trianon), significant Hungarian minority populations can be found in the surrounding countries, most of them in Romania (in Transylvania), Slovakia, and Serbia (in Vojvodina). Sizable minorities live also in Ukraine (in Transcarpathia), Croatia (primarily Slavonia), and Austria (in Burgenland). Slovenia is also host to a number of ethnic Hungarians, and Hungarian language has an official status in parts of the Prekmurje region. Today more than two million ethnic Hungarians live in nearby countries.

There was a referendum in Hungary in December 2004 on whether to grant Hungarian citizenship to Hungarians living outside Hungary's borders (i.e. without requiring a permanent residence in Hungary). The referendum failed due to insufficient voter turnout. On 26 May 2010, Hungary's Parliament passed a bill granting dual citizenship to ethnic Hungarians living outside of Hungary. Some neighboring countries with sizable Hungarian minorities expressed concerns over the legislation.

As of 2025, three Hungarians have been in spaceflight. Bertalan Farkas (1980), Charles Simonyi (2007) and Tibor Kapu (2025).

== Ethnic affiliations and genetic origins ==
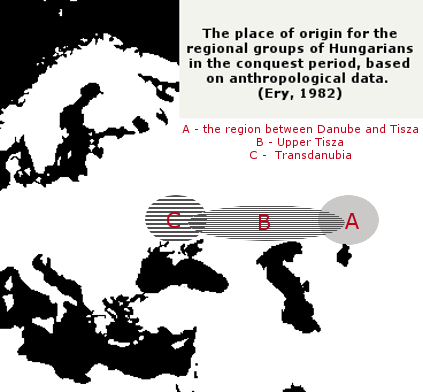
The place of origin for the regional groups of Hungarians in the conquest period, according to Kinga Éry.

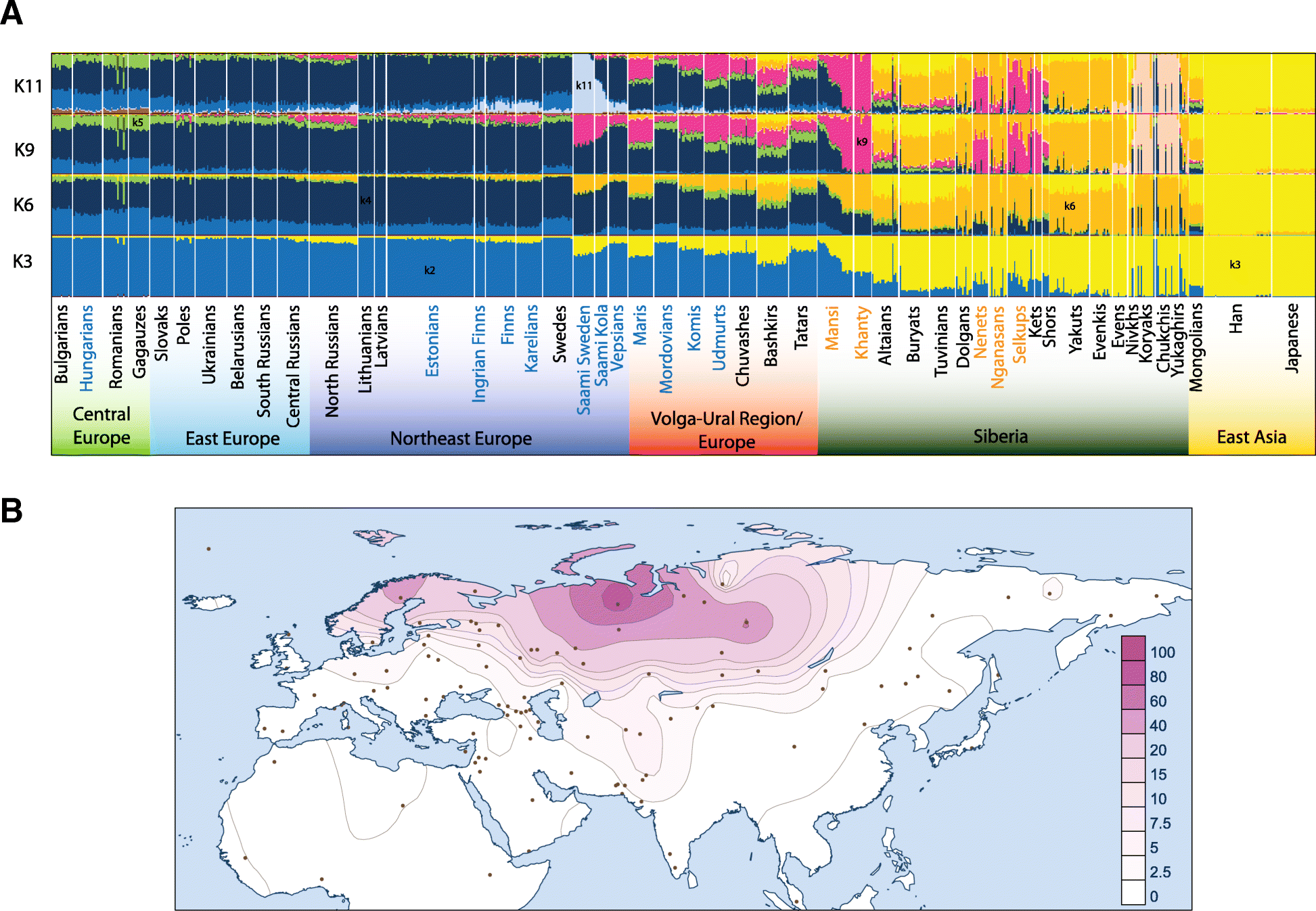
Population structure of Uralic-speaking populations inferred from ADMIXTURE analysis on autosomal SNPs in Eurasian context. Ugric-ancestry is represented by the Khanty and Mansi people.

Modern Hungarians stand out as linguistically isolated in Europe, despite their genetic similarity to the surrounding populations. The population of the Carpathian Basin has the common European gene-pool which formed in the Bronze Age through the admixture of three sources: Western Hunter-Gatherers, who were the first Homo sapiens appearing in Paleolithic Europe, Neolithic farmers originating from Anatolia, and Yamnaya steppe migrants that arrived in the late Neolithic to early Bronze Age. This common European gene pool in the Carpathian Basin, has been overlaid by migration waves originating from the east since the Iron Age. According to genetic studies, the Carpathian Basin was continuously inhabited from at least the Bronze Age. There is a genetic continuity from the Bronze Age, a continuous migration of the Steppe folks from east to the Carpathian Basin. The foundational population of the Carpathian Basin carrying the common European gene pool remained in a significant majority throughout the migratory periods in the Carpathian Basin. During the 9th century BC, smaller groups of pre-Scythians (Cimmerians) of the Mezőcsát culture appeared. The classic Scythian culture spread across the Great Hungarian Plain between the 7th–6th century BC, their genetic data represent the genetic profile of the local European population. The Sarmatians arrived in multiple waves from 50 BC, leaving a significant archaeological heritage behind, the examined Sarmatian individuals genetically also belong to the genetic legacy of the local European population. Various groups of Asian origin settled in the Carpathian Basin, such as Huns, Avars, Hungarian conquerors, Pechenegs, Jazyg people, and Cumans. The military leadership of the European Huns descended from the Asian Huns (Xiongnus), while the majority of them consisted of subjugated Germanic and Sarmatian populations. The most significant influx of genes from Asia occurred during the Avar period, arriving in multiple waves. The ruling elite of the Avars originated from the Rouran Khaganate in Mongolia, but a significant portion of the masses they brought in consisted of mixed-origin populations that had emerged in the Pontic-Caspian steppe during the Hunnic era. Foundation of the Hungarian state is connected to the Hungarian conquerors, who arrived from the Pontic steppes as a confederation of seven tribes. According to genetic study, the proto-Ugric groups were part of the Scytho-Siberian societies in the late Bronze Age to early Iron Age steppe-forest zone in the northern Kazakhstan region, near of the Mezhovskaya culture territory. The ancestors of the Hungarian conquerors lived in the steppe zone during the Bronze Age together with the Mansis. During the Iron Age, the Mansis migrated northward, while the ancestor of Hungarian conquerors remained at the steppe-forest zone and admixed with the Sarmatians. Later the ancestors of the Hungarian conquerors admixed with the Huns, this admixture happened before the arrival of the Huns to the Volga region in 370. The Huns integrated local tribes east of the Urals, among them Sarmatians and the ancestors of the Hungarian conquerors. The Hungarians arrived in the frame of a strong centralized steppe-empire under the leadership of Grand Prince Álmos and his son Árpád, they became founders of the Árpád dynasty, the Hungarian ruling dynasty and the Hungarian state. The Árpád dynasty claimed to be a direct descendant of the great Hun leader Attila. The elite of the conquering Hungarians established the Hungarian state, genetic studies revealed, the conqueror elite in both sexes has approximately 30% Eastern Eurasian components, while the commoner population appears to have carried the overlaid local European gene pool from previous eastern immigrations. In medieval Hungary, a legend developed based on foreign and Hungarian medieval chronicles that the Hungarians, and the Székely ethnic group in particular, are descended from the Huns. The basic premise of the Hungarian medieval chronicle tradition was that the Huns, i.e. the Hungarians coming out twice from Scythia, the guiding principle was the Hun-Hungarian continuity. The 20th century mainstream scholarship dismisses a close connection between the Hungarians and Huns. However, the archaeogenetic studies revealed the Hun heritage of the Hungarian conquerors, it was a significant Hun-Hungarian mixing around 300 AD, and the remaining Huns were integrated into the conquering Hungarians. The genomic analyses of the Hungarian royal Árpád family members are in line with the reported conquering Hungarian-Hun origin of the dynasty in harmony with their Y-chromosomal phylogenetic connections. According to the growing archaeological evidence that the Avar population lived through the period of the Hungarian conquest of the Carpathian Basin. The Carpathian Basin was demonstrably not empty when the Hungarian conquerors led by Árpád arrived. The conquering Hungarians mixed to varying degrees on individual level with the Avar population living in the Carpathian Basin, but they had Avar genetic heritage as well. According to Endre Neparáczki, it is no longer possible to narrow down the Hungarian population of the Carpathian Basin only of people of Árpád. Following the devastations caused by the Mongol and Turkish invasions, settlers from other parts of Europe played a significant role in establishing the modern genetic makeup of the Carpathian Basin.

The Hungarian language belongs to the Uralic language family. While early Ugric-speakers can be associated with an ancestry component maximized in modern-day Khanty/Mansi and historical Southern Siberian groups such as the Pazyryk culture people, the earliest Uralic-speakers can be associated with an Ancient Northern East Asian lineage maximized among modern Nganasans and a Bronze Age specimen from Krasnoyarsk in southern Siberia (Krasnoyarsk_Krai_BA; kra001). This type of ancestry later dispersed along the Seima-Turbino route westwards. They may also stood in contact with other Ancient Northeast Asians (partially linked to the ethnogenesis of Turkic and Mongolic peoples) and Western Steppe Herders (Indo-European). Modern Hungarians are however genetically rather distant from their closest linguistic relatives (Mansi and Khanty), and more similar to the neighbouring non-Uralic neighbors. Modern Hungarians share a small but significant "Inner Asian/Siberian" component with other Uralic-speaking populations. The historical Hungarian conqueror YDNA variation had a higher affinity with modern day Bashkirs and Volga Tatars as well as to two specimens of the Pazyryk culture, while their mtDNA has strong links to the populations of the Baraba region, Inner Asia, Eastern Europe, Northern Europe and Central Asia. Modern Hungarians also display genetic affinity with historical Sintashta samples. A deeper analysis of historical Hungarian conqueror mtDNA variation revealed that more than one third of their maternal lineages derived from Central-Inner Asian groups like the Saka and the Huns, while the rest originated from the Bronze Age Potapovka-Poltavka-Srubnaya cultures of the Pontic-Caspian steppe.

Archaeological mtDNA haplogroups show a similarity between Hungarians and Turkic-speaking Tatars and Bashkirs, while another study found a link between the Mansi and Bashkirs, suggesting that the Bashkirs are a mixture of Turkic, Ugric and Indo-European contributions. The homeland of ancient Hungarians is around the Ural Mountains, and the Hungarian affinities with the Karayakupovo culture is widely accepted among researchers. A full genome study found that the Bashkirs display, next to their high European ancestry, also affinity to both Uralic-speaking populations of Northern Asia, as well as Inner Asian Turkic groups, "pointing to a mismatch of their cultural background and genetic ancestry and an intricacy of the historic interface between Turkic and Uralic populations".

The homeland of the proto-Uralic peoples may have been close to Southern Siberia, among forest cultures in the Altai-Sayan region and may be linked to an ancestry maximized in the early Tarim mummies. The arrival of the Indo-European Afanasievo culture and Northeast Asian tribes may have caused the dispersal and expansion of proto-Uralic languages along the Seima-Turbino cultural area.

Neparáczki et al. argues, based on archaeogenetic results, that the historical Hungarian Conquerors were mostly a mixture of Central Asian Steppe groups, Slavic, and Germanic tribes, and this composite people evolved between 400 and 1000 AD. According to Neparáczki: "From all recent and archaic populations tested the Volga Tatars show the smallest genetic distance to the entire Conqueror population" and "a direct genetic relation of the Conquerors to Onogur-Bulgar ancestors of these groups is very feasible." Genetic data found high affinity between Magyar conquerors, the historical Bulgars, and modern day Turkic-speaking peoples in the Volga region, suggesting a possible language shifted from an Uralic (Ugric) to Turkic languages.

Hunnish origin or influences on Hungarians and Székelys have always been a matter of debate among scholars. In Hungary, a legend developed based on medieval chronicles that the Hungarians, and the Székely ethnic group in particular, are descended from the Huns. However, mainstream scholarship dismisses a close connection between the Hungarians and Huns. A genetic study published in Scientific Reports in November 2019 led by Neparáczki Endre had examined the remains of three males from three separate 5th century Hunnic cemeteries in the Pannonian Basin. They were found to be carrying the paternal haplogroups Q1a2, R1b1a1b1a1a1 and R1a1a1b2a2. In modern Europe, Q1a2 is rare and has its highest frequency among the Székelys. It is believed that conquering Magyars may have absorbed Avar, Hunnish and Xiongnu influences.

=== Paternal haplogroups ===
Hungarian males possess a high frequency of haplogroup R1a-Z280 and a low frequency of haplogroup N-Tat, which is uncommon among most Uralic-speaking populations. Historical Magyar conquerors had around ~37.5% Haplogroup N-M231, as well as lower frequency of Haplogroup C-M217 at 6.25% with the remainder being Haplogroup R1a and Haplogroup Q-M242. An analysis of Bashkir samples from the Burzyansky and Abzelilovsky districts of the Republic of Bashkortostan in the Volga-Ural region, revealed them to belong to the R1a subclade R1a-SUR51, which is shared in significant amounts with the historical Magyars and the royal Hungarian lineage, and representing the closest kin to the Hungarian Árpád dynasty, whose ancestry is traced to 4500 years ago, in modern day Northern Afghanistan. In turn, R1a-SUR51's ancestral subclades R1a-Y2632 are found among the Saka population of the Tien Shan, date: 427-422 BC. In the case of the Southern Mansi males, the most frequent haplogroups were N1b-P43 (33%), N1c-L1034 (28%) and R1a-Z280 (19%). The Konda Mansi population shared common haplotypes within haplogroups R1a-Z280 or N-M46 with Hungarian speakers, which may suggest that the Hungarians were in contact with the Mansi people during their migration to the Carpathian Basin.

According to a study by Pamjav, the Hungarian area of Bodrogköz which is suggested to be a population isolate, found R1a-M458 (20.4%), I2a1-P37 (19%), R1a-Z280 (14.3%), and E1b-M78 (10.2%). Various R1b-M343 subgroups accounted for 15% of the Bodrogköz population. Haplogroup N1c-Tat covered 6.2% of the lineages, but most of it belonged to the N1c-VL29 subgroup, which is more frequent among Balto-Slavic speaking than Finno-Ugric speaking peoples. Other haplogroups had frequencies of less than 5%. Among 100 Hungarian men, 90 of whom from the Great Hungarian Plain, (including Cuman descendants from Kunság region) the following haplogroups and frequencies are obtained: 30% R1a, 15% R1b, 13% I2a1, 13% J2, 9% E1b1b1a, 8% I1, 3% G2, 3% J1, 3% I*, 1% E*, 1% F*, 1% K*. The 97 Székelys belong to the following haplogroups: 20% R1b, 19% R1a, 17% I1, 11% J2, 10% J1, 8% E1b1b1a, 5% I2a1, 5% G2, 3% P*, 1% E*, 1% N. It can be inferred that Szekelys have more significant German admixture. A study sampling 45 Palóc from Budapest and northern Hungary, found 60% R1a, 13% R1b, 11% I, 9% E, 2% G, 2% J2. A study estimating possible Inner Asian admixture among nearly 500 Hungarians based on paternal lineages only, estimated it at 5.1% in Hungary, at 7.4 in Székelys and at 6.3% at Csángós.

=== Autosomal DNA ===
Modern Hungarians show relative close affinity to surrounding populations, but harbour a small "Siberian" component associated with Khanty/Mansi, as well as the Nganasan people, and argued to have arrived with the historical Magyars. Modern Hungarians formed from several historical population groupings, including the historical Magyars, assimilated Slavic and Germanic groups, as well as Central Asian Steppe tribes (presumably Turkic and Iranian tribes).

The historical Magyar genome corresponds largely with the modern Volga Tatars and Bashkirs, and can be modeled as ~50% Khanty/Mansi-like, ~35% Sarmatian-like, and ~15% Hun/Xiongnu-like. The admixture event is suggested to have taken place in the Southern Ural region at 643–431 BCE. Modern Hungarians were found to be admixed descendants of the historical Magyar conquerors with local Europeans, as 31 Hungarian samples could be modelled as two-way admixtures of "Conq_Asia_Core" and "EU_Core" in varying degrees.

=== Other influences ===
Besides the various peoples mentioned above, the Magyars were later influenced by other populations in the Carpathian Basin. Among these are the Cumans, Pechenegs, Jazones, West Slavs, Germans (more specifically Hungarian Germans but also Transylvanian Saxons or other ethnic German minorities in the former Kingdom of Hungary or in Central and Eastern Europe such as the Zipser Germans, and Vlachs (Romanians).

Slovaks, Serbs, Croats, and others) that resettled the depopulated central and southern territories of the kingdom (roughly present-day South Hungary, Vojvodina in Serbia and Banat in Romania) after their departure inevitably exerted an influence. Similar to other European countries, Armenian, and Roma ethnic minorities have been living in Hungary since the Middle Ages. Jews have been living in Hungary since the Roman era, as the archaeological evidence of Jewish gravestones dating from this period demonstrates.

== Diaspora ==
Hungarian diaspora in the world (includes people with Hungarian ancestry or citizenship). Hungary + 1,000,000 + 100,000 + 10,000 + 1,000

Hungarian diaspora (szórványmagyarság) is a term encompassing the total ethnic Hungarian population located outside of the borders of present-day Hungary.

Maps of the Hungarian diaspora
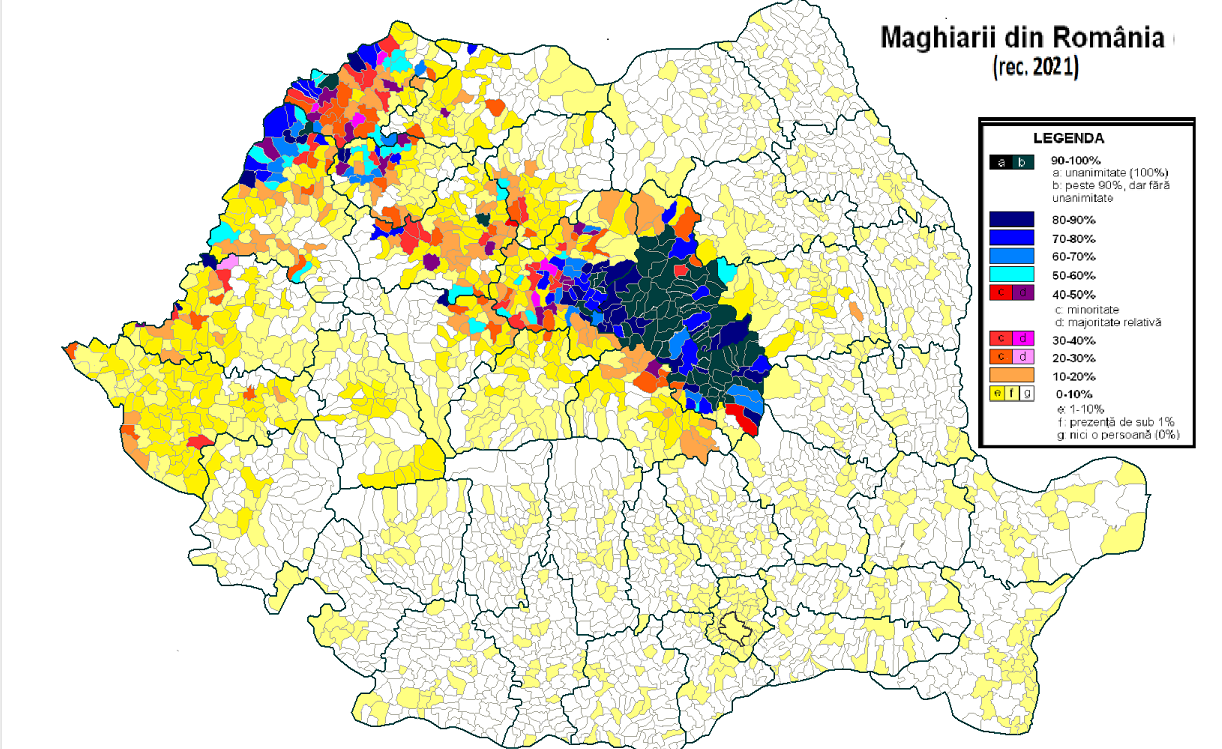
Hungarians in Romania (according to the 2021 census)

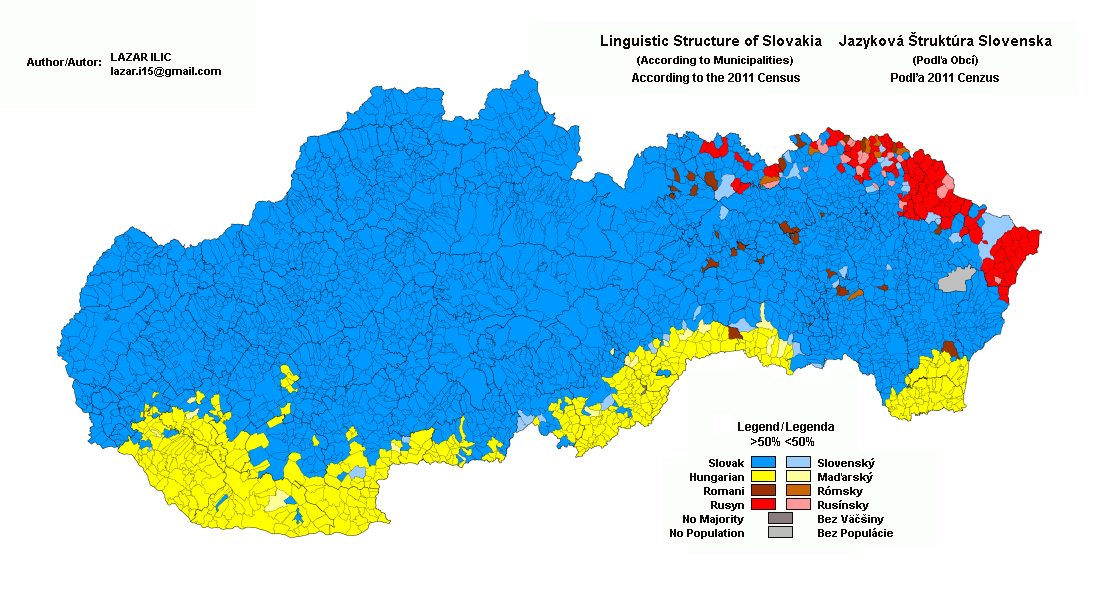
Hungarians in Slovakia (according to the 2011 census)

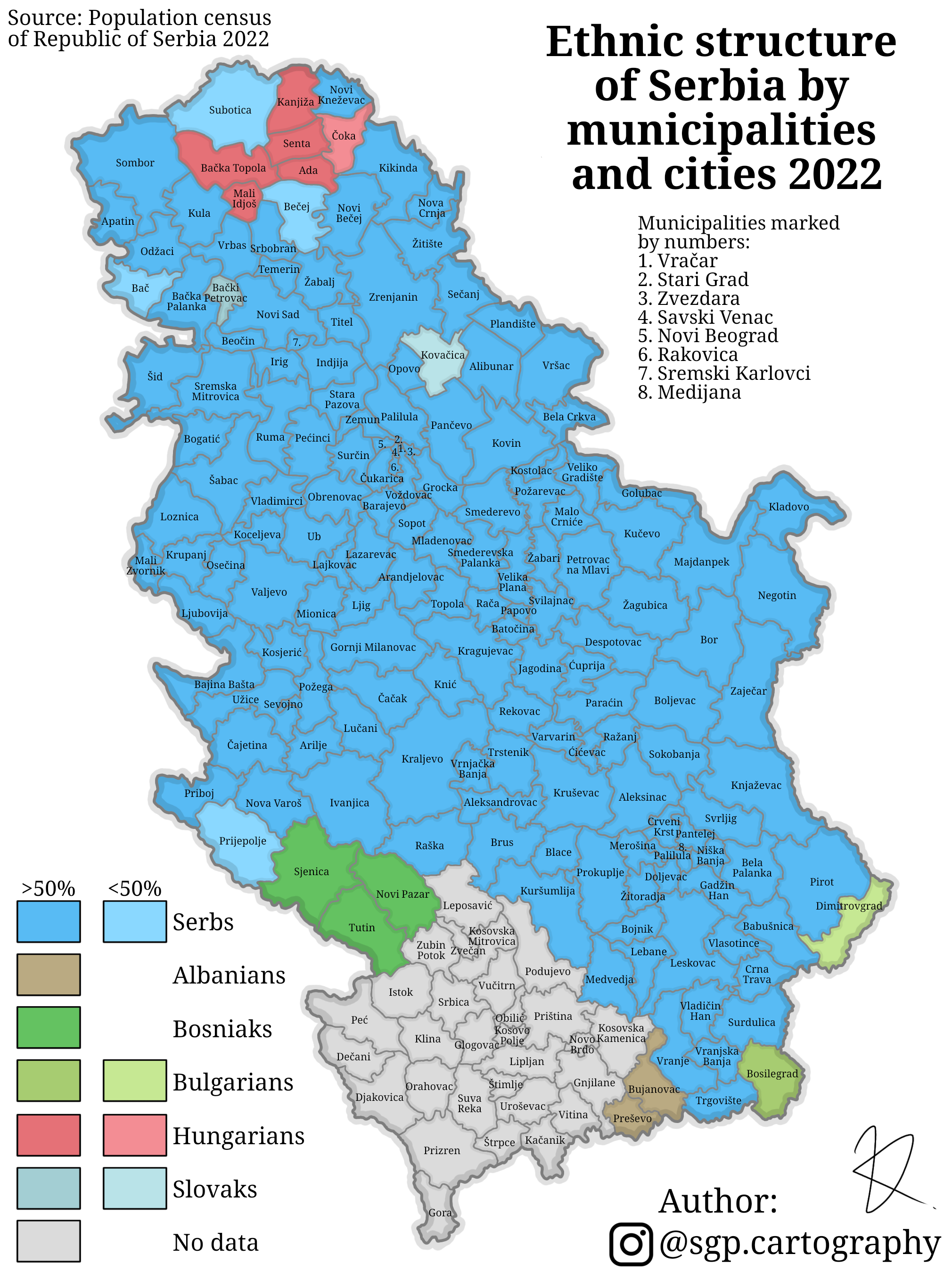
Hungarians in Serbia (according to the 2022 census)

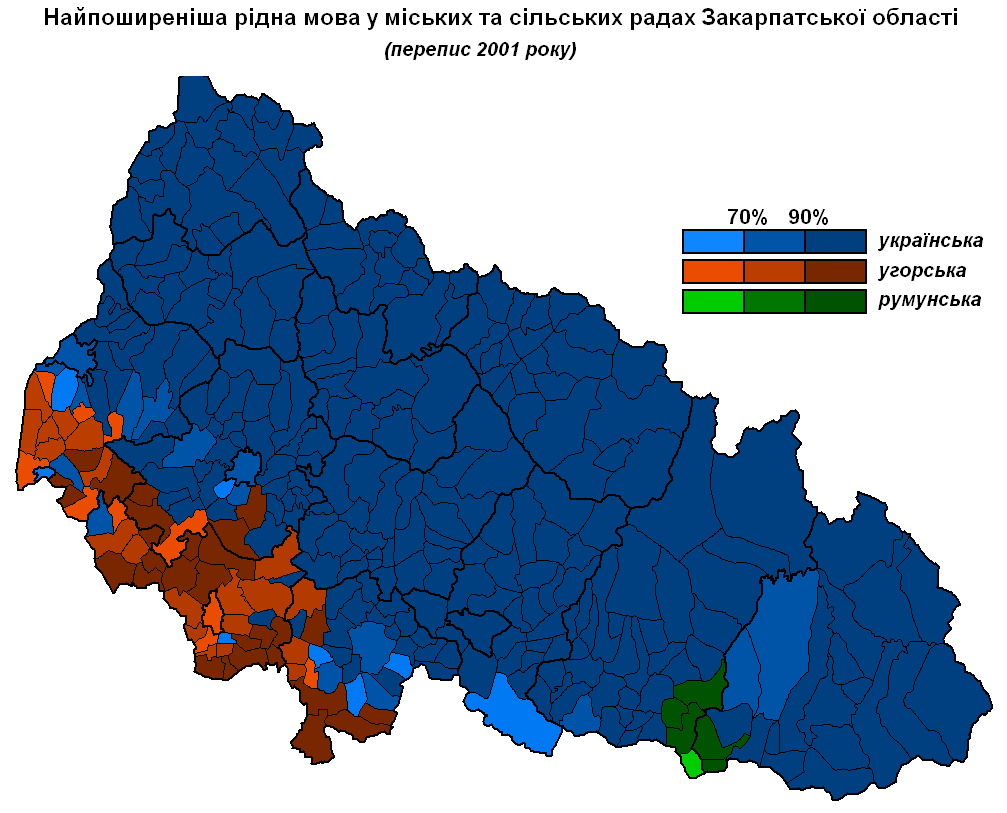
Hungarians in Ukraine (according to the 2001 census)

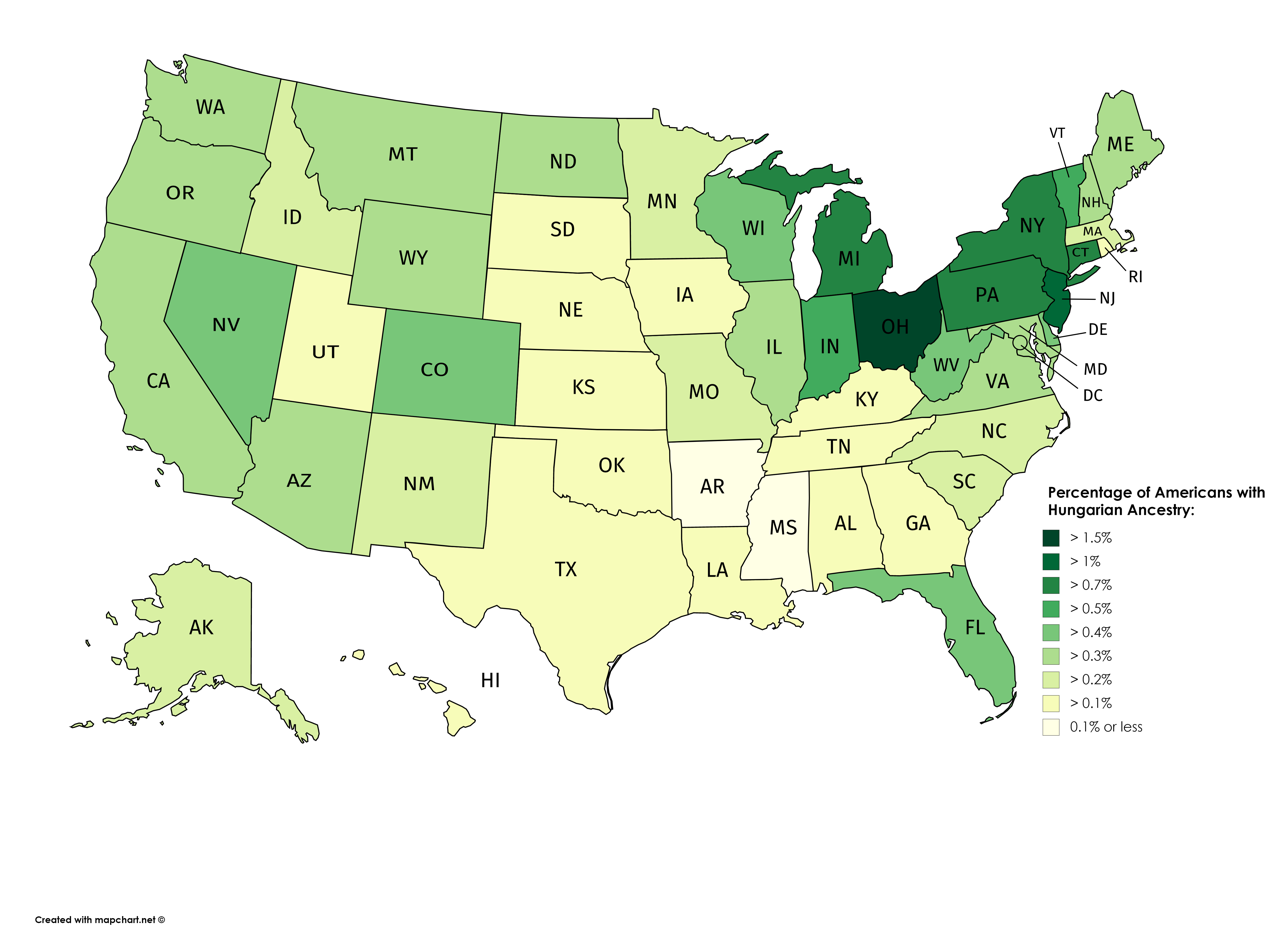
Hungarians in the United States (according to the 2018 census)

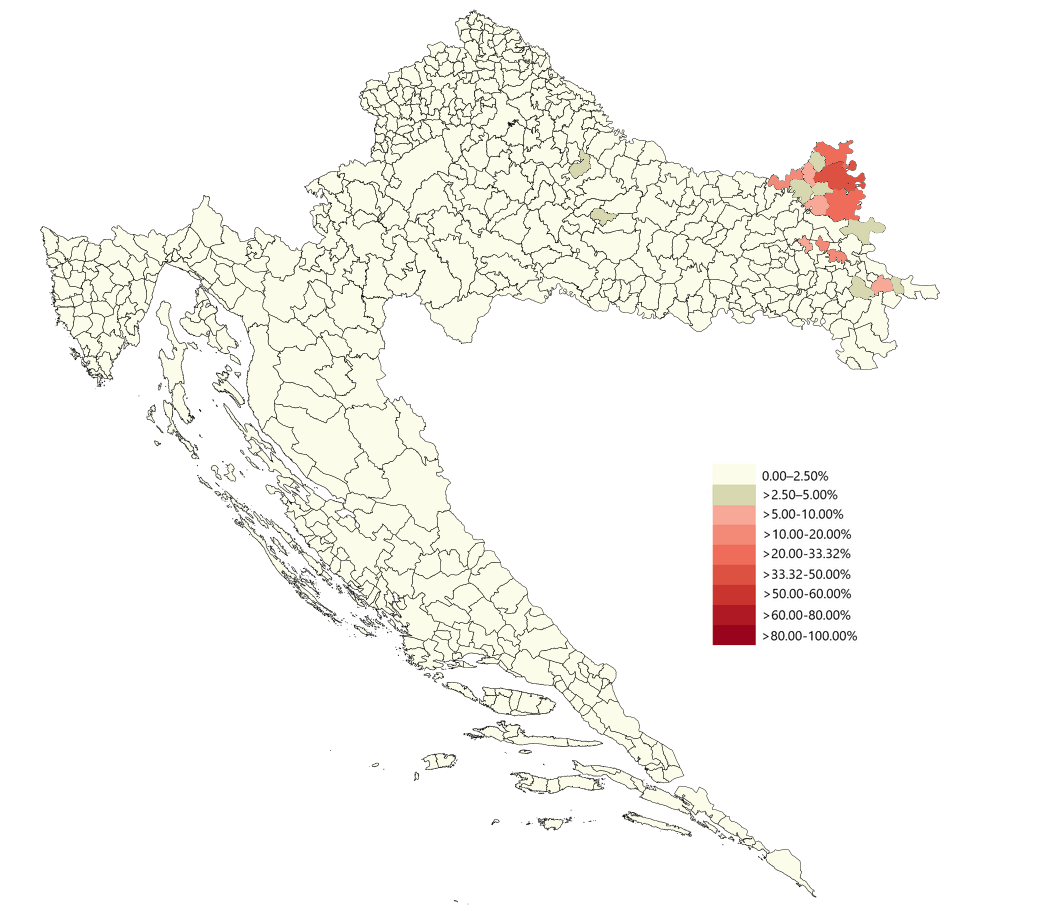
Hungarians of Croatia (according to the 2021 census)

Hungarians in Germany (according to the 2021 census)

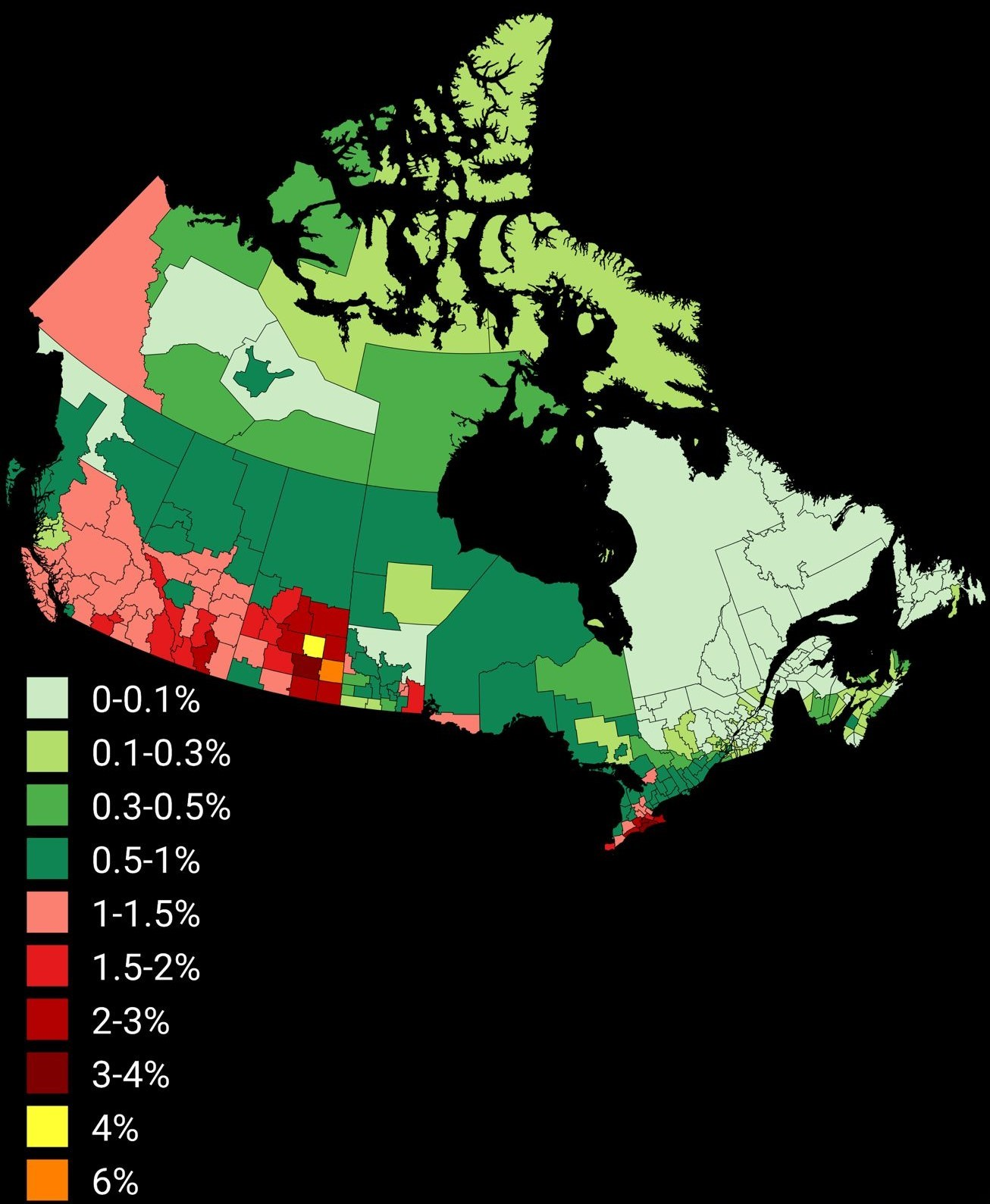
Hungarians in Canada (according to the 2021 census)

== Maps ==
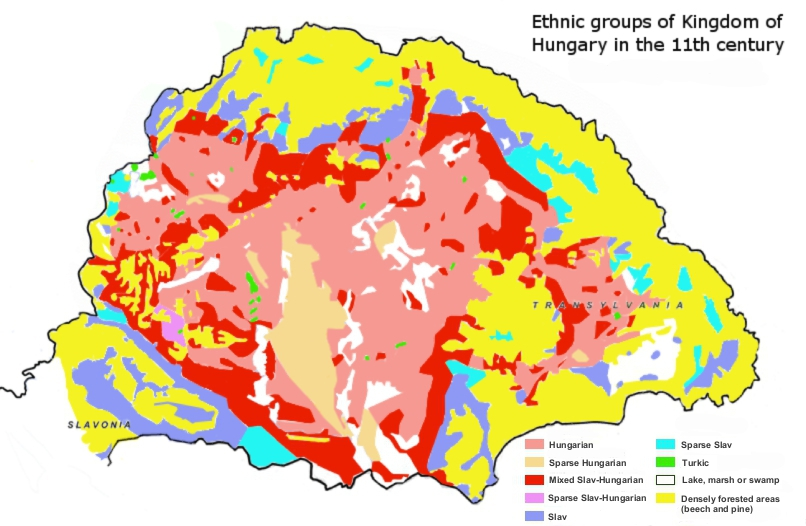
Kniezsa's (1938) view on the ethnic map of the Kingdom of Hungary in the 11th century, based on toponyms. Kniezsa's view has been criticized by many scholars, because of its non-compliance with later archaeological and onomastics research, but his map is still regularly cited in modern reliable sources. One of the most prominent critics of this map was Emil Petrovici.

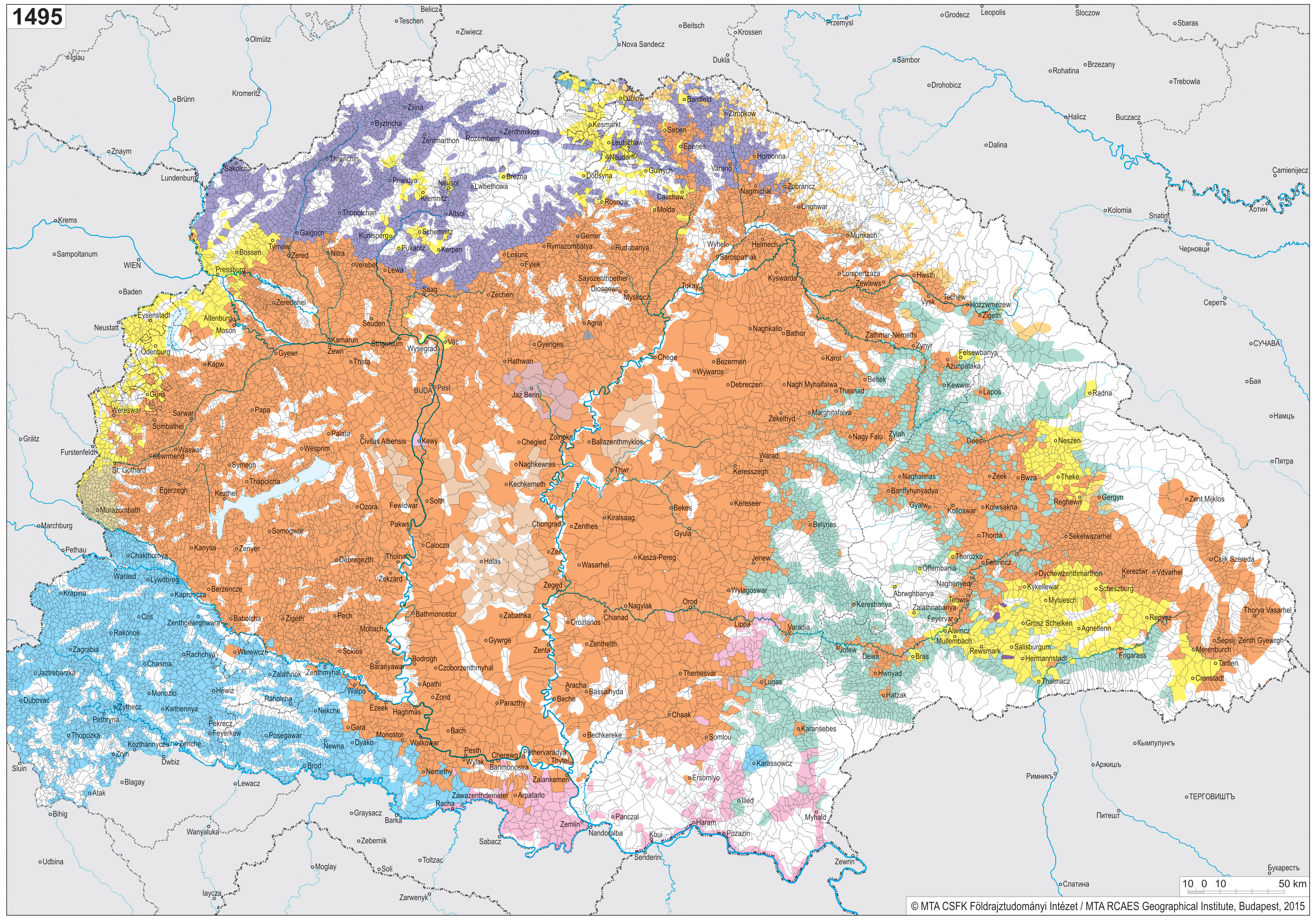
Ethnic map of the Kingdom of Hungary in 1495 by the Hungarian Academy of Sciences (Hungarians are depicted in orange)

The "Red Map", based on the 1910 census. Regions with population density below 20 persons/km^{2} (52 persons/sq mi) are left blank and the corresponding population is represented in the nearest region with population density above that limit. Red colour to mark Hungarians and light purple colour to mark Romanians.

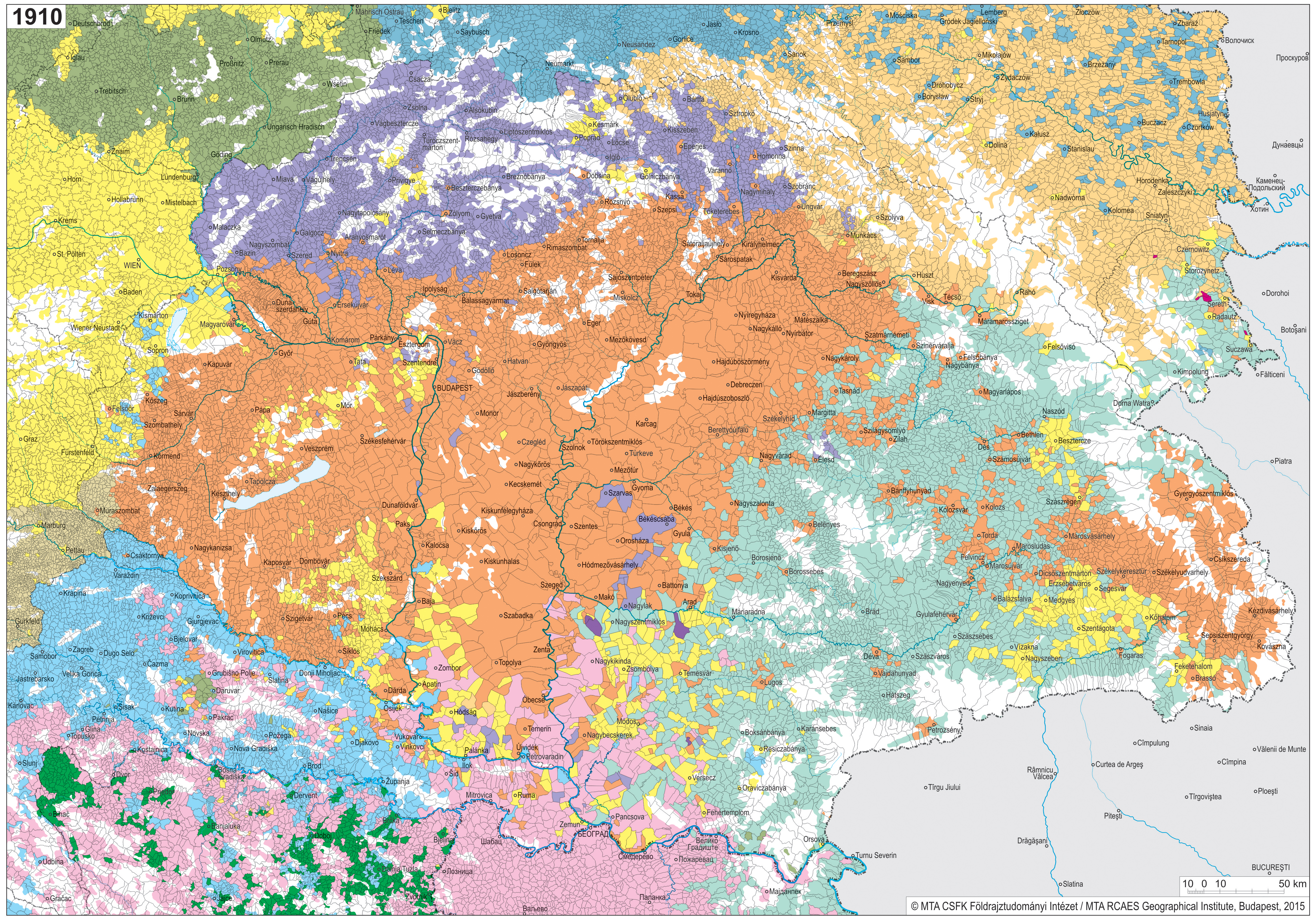
Ethnic map of the Kingdom of Hungary in 1910, based on the 1910 Hungarian census.

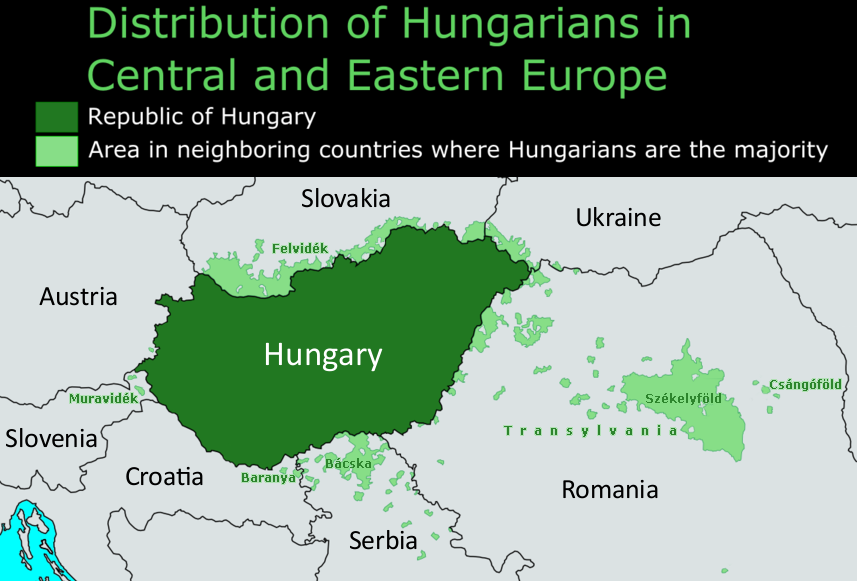
Ethnic map depicting the contemporary ethnic distribution of Hungarians across the Pannonian Basin (also known and referred to as the Carpathian Basin). Legend:
Hungary proper where Hungarians are the ethnic majority people
Regions outside Hungary where there are notable ethnic Hungarian minorities

== Culture ==
The culture of Hungary shows distinctive elements, incorporating local European and Ottoman influences, and minor Central Asian/Steppe derived traditions, such as Horse culture and Shamanistic remnants in Hungarian folklore.

== Folklore and communities ==
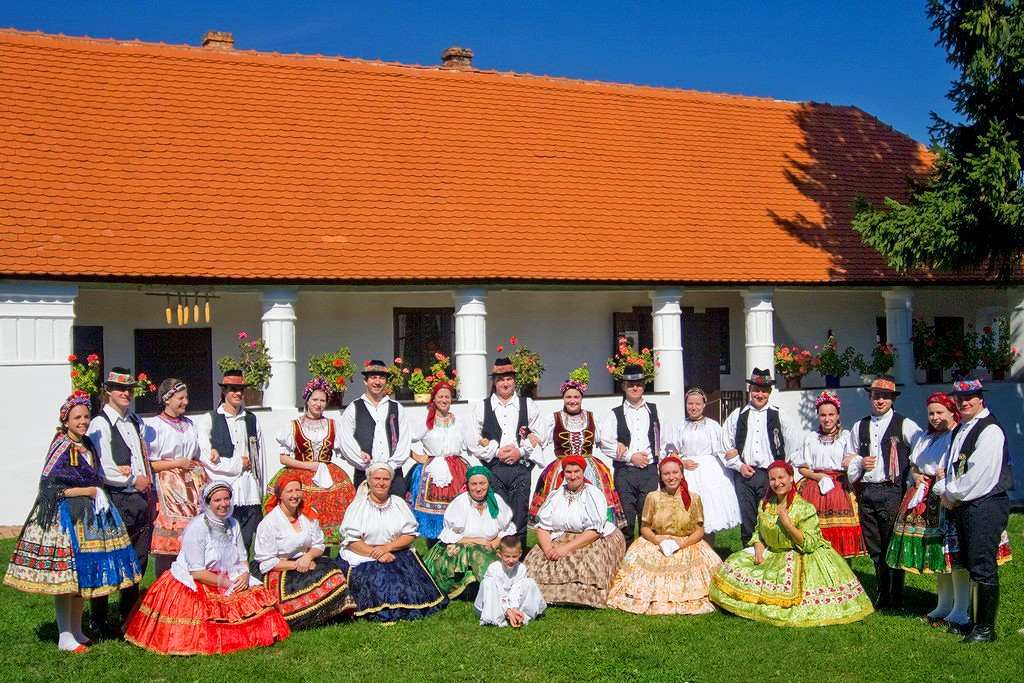
Hungarians dressed in folk costumes in Southern Transdanubia, Hungary

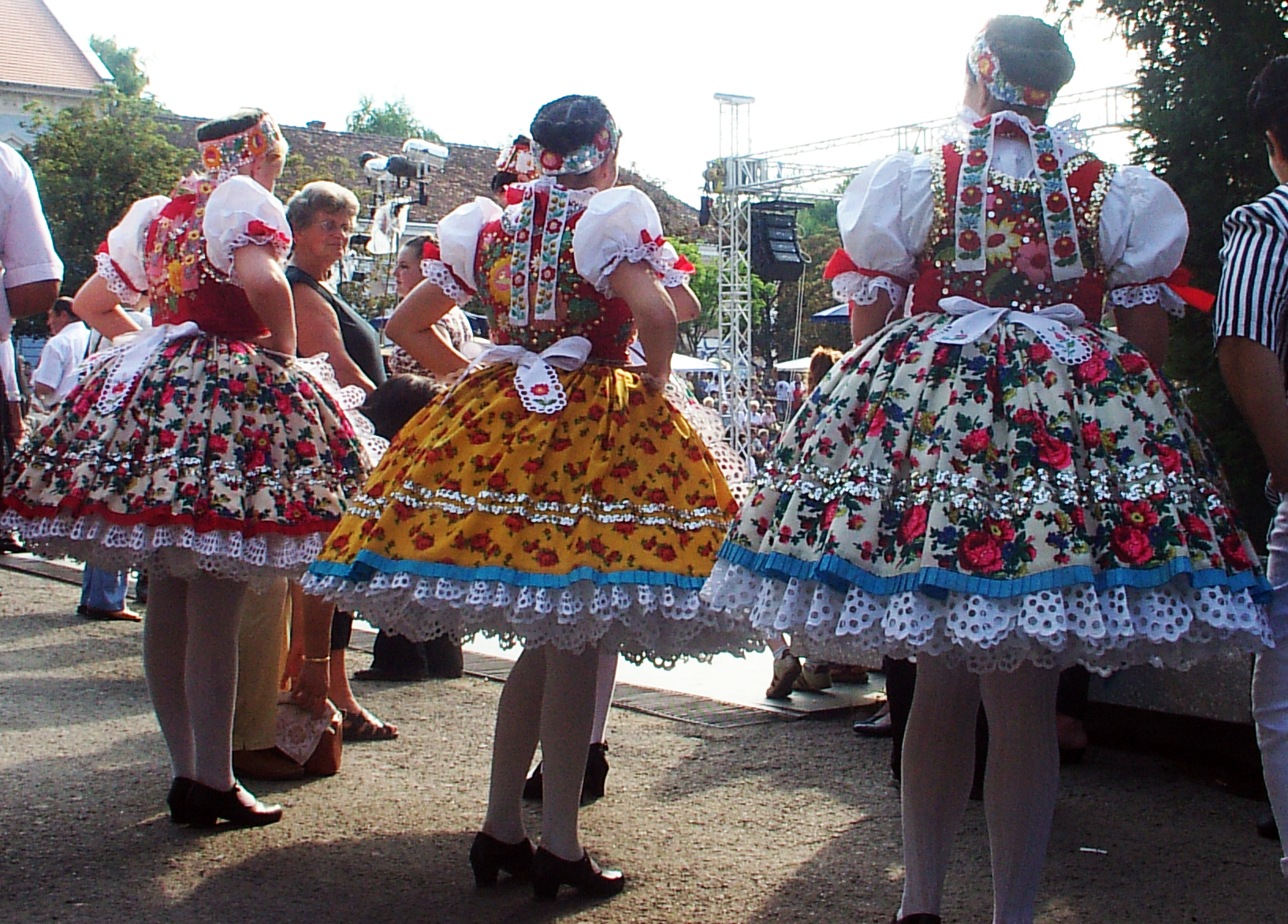
Women's folk costume in Vojvodina, Serbia

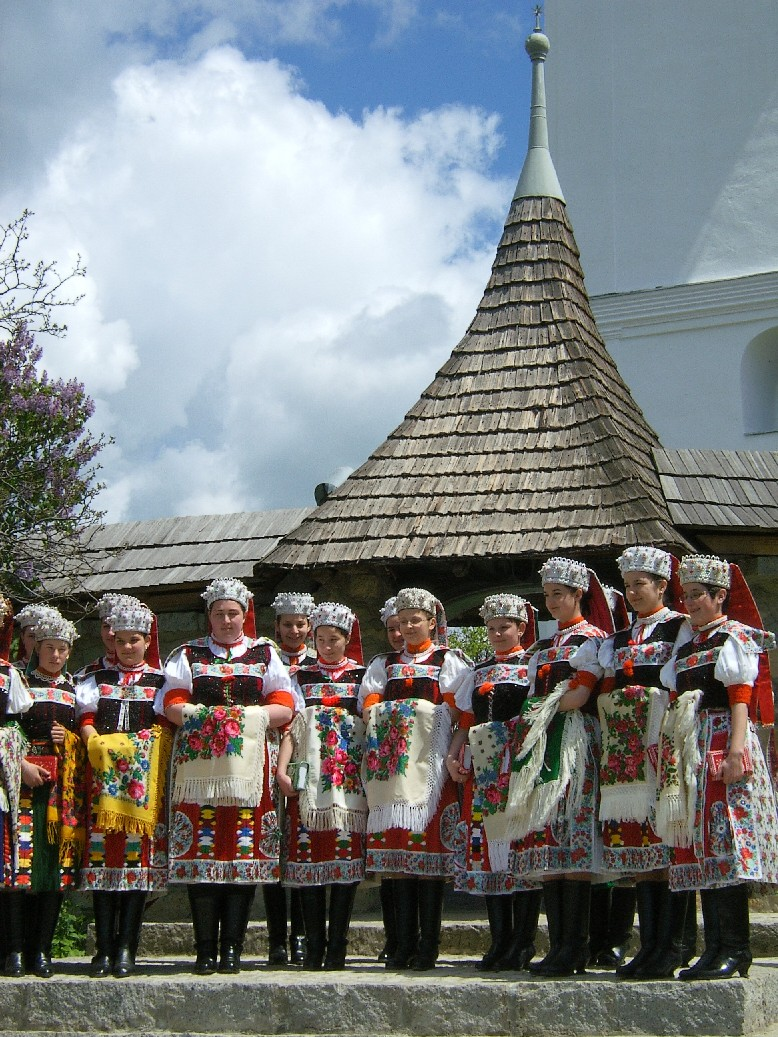
Kalotaszeg folk costume in Transylvania, Romania

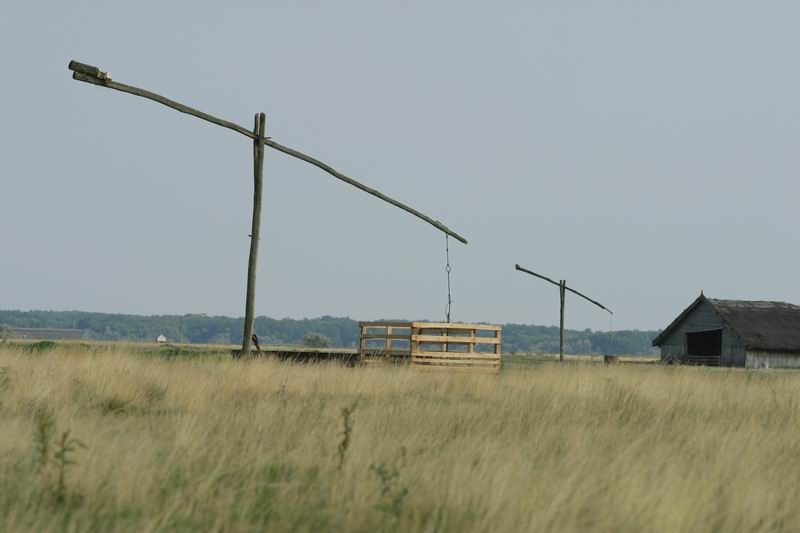
The Hungarian Puszta

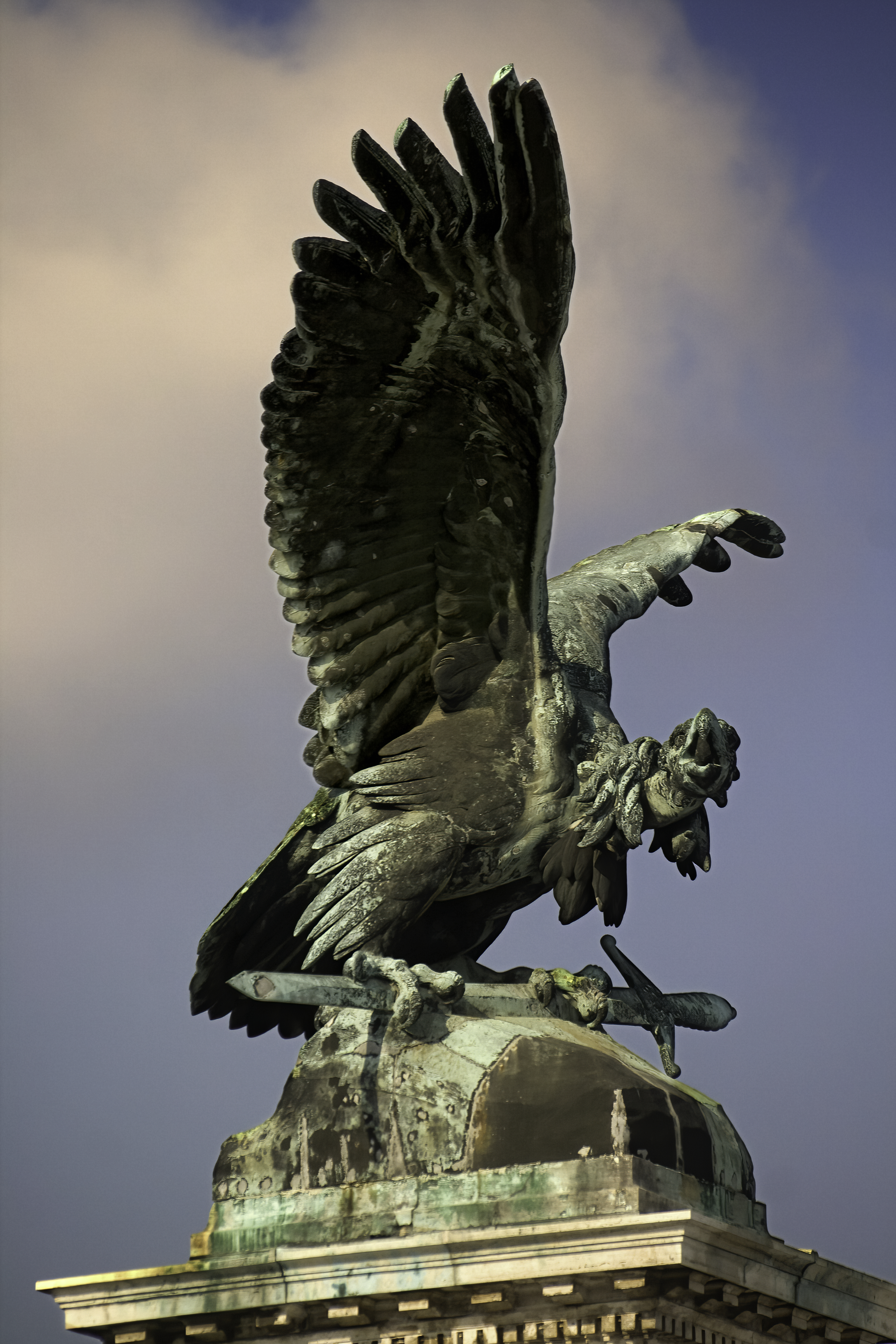
The Turul, the mythical bird of Hungary

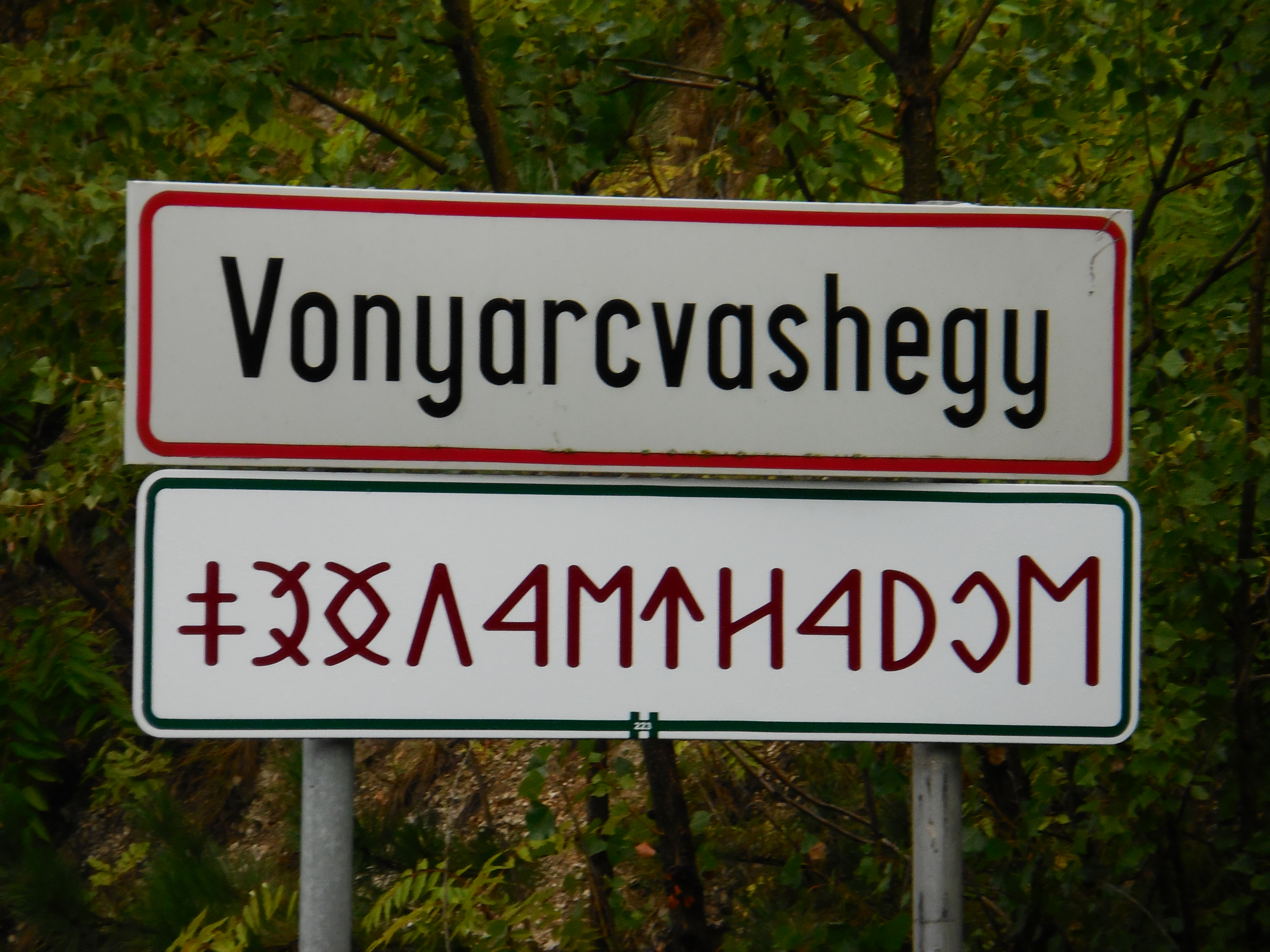
Welcome sign in Latin and in Old Hungarian script for the town of Vonyarcvashegy, Hungary

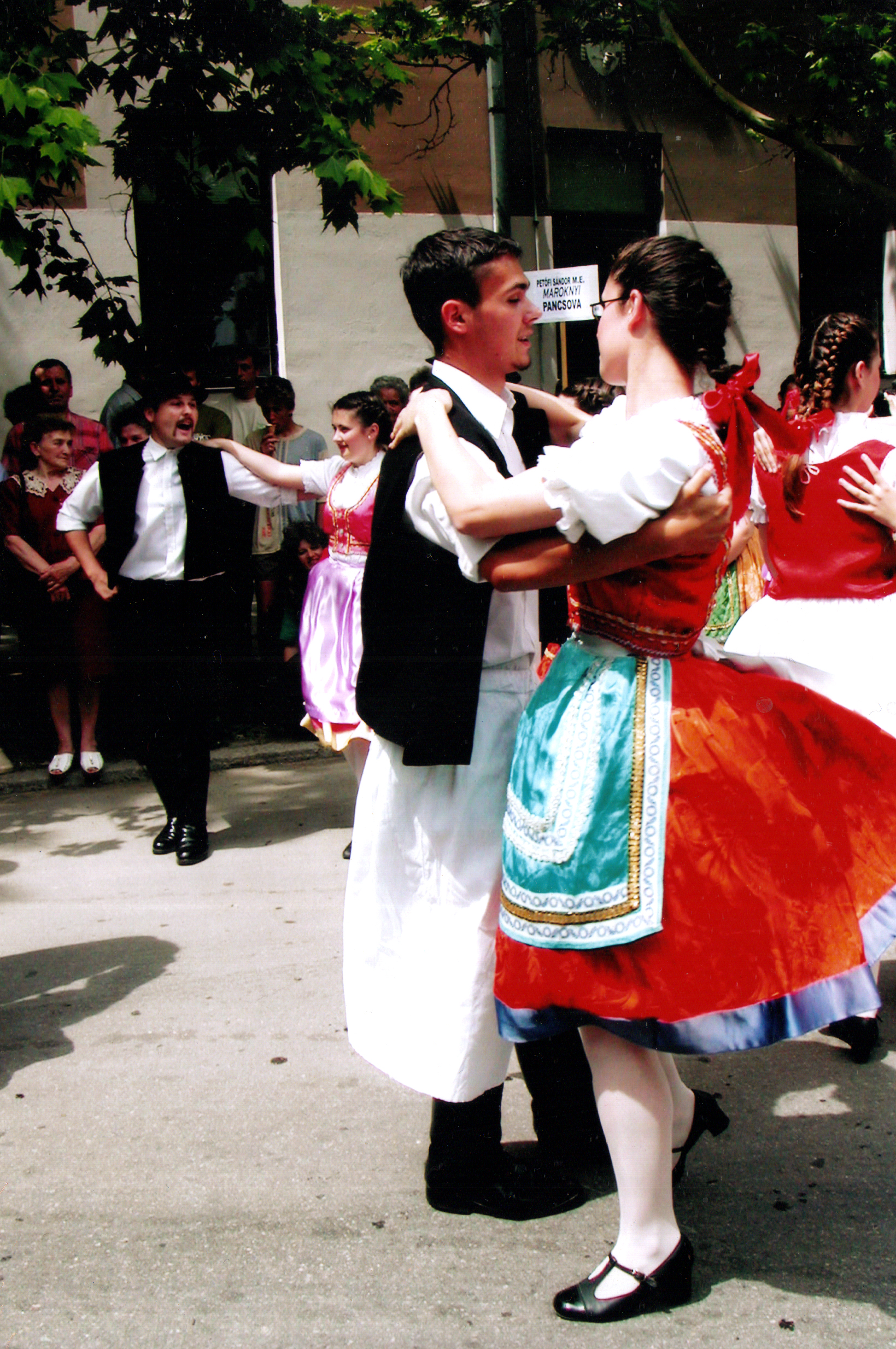
Csárdás folk dance in Skorenovac (Székelykeve), Serbia

== See also ==
- Central Europe
- Demographics of Hungary
- List of Hungarians
- List of people of Hungarian origin
- Ugric languages
- Khanty people
- Mansi people
- Eastern Magyars
- Magyarab people
- Jász people
- Székelys of Bukovina
- Kunság
- Pole, Hungarian, two good friends
- Hungarian mythology
- Hunor and Magor
- Shamanistic remnants in Hungarian folklore
- List of domesticated animals from Hungary
- Hungarian Americans
- Hungarian cuisine
- Hungarian culture
- Romani people in Hungary
- Hungarian Canadians

== Sources ==
- Keyser, Christine; et al. (30 July 2020). "Genetic evidence suggests a sense of family, parity and conquest in the Xiongnu Iron Age nomads of Mongolia". Human Genetics. 557 (7705). Springer: 369–373. doi:10.1007/s00439-020-02209-4. PMID 32734383.
- Molnar, Miklos (2001). A Concise History of Hungary. Cambridge Concise Histories (Fifth printing 2008 ed.). Cambridge, United Kingdom: Cambridge University Press. ISBN 978-0-521-66736-4.
- Korai Magyar Történeti Lexicon (9–14. század) (Encyclopedia of the Early Hungarian History (9th–14th Centuries)) Budapest, Akadémiai Kiadó; 753. ISBN 963-05-6722-9.
- Károly Kocsis (DSc, University of Miskolc) – Zsolt Bottlik (PhD, Budapest University) – Patrik Tátrai: Etnikai térfolyamatok a Kárpát-medence határon túli régióiban + CD (for detailed data), Magyar Tudományos Akadémia (Hungarian Academy of Sciences) – Földrajtudományi Kutatóintézet (Academy of Geographical Studies); Budapest; 2006.; ISBN 963-9545-10-4
- Lendvai, Paul (2003). The Hungarians: A Thousand Years of Victory in Defeat. Translated by Major, Ann. Princeton, NJ: Princeton University Press. ISBN 978-1-4008-5152-2.
- Neparáczki, Endre; et al. (12 November 2019). "Y-chromosome haplogroups from Hun, Avar and conquering Hungarian period nomadic people of the Carpathian Basin". Scientific Reports. 9 (16569). Nature Research: 16569. Bibcode:2019NatSR...916569N. doi:10.1038/s41598-019-53105-5. PMC 6851379. PMID 31719606.
- Szűcs, Jenő (1999). "Theoretical Elements in Master Simon of Kéza's Gesta Hungarorum (1282–1285)". In László Veszprémy; Frank Schaer (eds.). Simon of Kéza: Deeds of the Hungarians. Central European University Press. pp. xxix–cii.

As of this edit, this article uses content from "A Y-chromosomal study of mansi population from konda River Basin in Ural", which is licensed in a way that permits reuse under the Creative Commons Attribution-ShareAlike 3.0 Unported License, but not under the GFDL. All relevant terms must be followed.
