= Geoffrey the Grammarian =

Geoffrey the Grammarian (fl. 1440) (in Latin: Galfridus Grammaticus) was an English medieval monk and grammarian who wrote several treatises. Geoffrey was originally from Norfolk, England.

In the late 15th century, Geoffrey published the Thesaurus Linguae Romanae et Britannicae, which was the first English-to-Latin wordbook. The Promptorium parvulorum also is attributed to Geoffrey.
