= Catholicon Anglicum =

1483 English-to-Latin dictionary

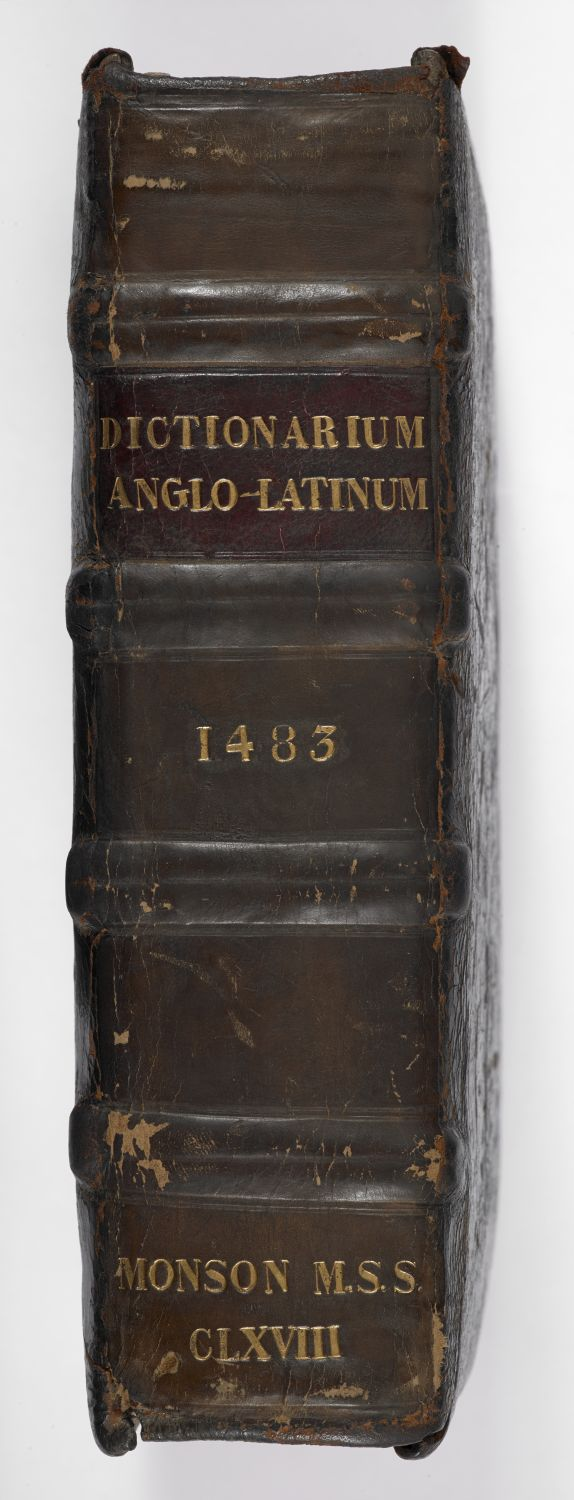
The Monson manuscript of the Catholicon Anglicum, MS. 168, now British Library Add MS 89074

The Catholicon Anglicum (lit. 'Universal English [Dictionary]') is an English-to-Latin bilingual dictionary compiled in the late 15th century.

== History ==
=== Writing and publishing ===
The Catholicon Anglicum was written in 1483. Its author was anonymous at the time of its writing in the 15th century, and remains unknown to the present day. From the dialect of English used, the author might have been a native of Yorkshire in the north of England.

The book was republished by the Camden Society in 1882. The dictionary was edited by Sidney Herrtage prior to its republication.

=== Current status ===
Two copies of the dictionary are known to be still in existence, only one of which is complete. Since 2014, both dictionaries reside in the British Library. The first is incomplete: some of the leaves in this copy are missing. It was purchased by the British Museum in 1846, and was added to the Additional Manuscripts sequence. It is now British Library Add MS 15562. The second, complete dictionary was manuscript no. 168 in the Monson family collection and was collated with Add MS 15562 in a publication by the Camden Society in 1882. This complete version was put up for sale in 2013.

=== Auction ===
In July 2013, the complete copy of the Catholicon Anglicum, formerly owned by the Monson family, was sold by Sotheby's to a buyer outside of the United Kingdom for £92,500, so an export ban was subsequently placed on the book by then-culture minister Ed Vaizey after a recommendation from the Reviewing Committee on the Export of Works of Art and Objects of Cultural Interest (RCEWA), administered by Arts Council England. The purchase price was eventually matched by the British Library, which purchased the book on 27 February 2014, shortly before the expiration of the ban. It was then added to the Additional Manuscripts sequence, as Add MS 89074.

== Notability ==
The Catholicon Anglicum is notable for being one of the earliest dictionaries in the English language. The Oxford English Dictionary stated that many important words in the English language such as diphthong were first attested in the Catholicon Anglicum.

The importance of the Catholicon Anglicum has been described by Ed Vaizey: "The manuscript is of outstanding significance for the history of the English language, which is fundamental to the identity and life of our nation."

Christopher Wright from the RCEWA has said:

This rare survival of a 15th-century English-Latin word list is one of the vital first steps on the road to the English dictionary as we know it today. Its anonymous author, possibly a Yorkshireman on the basis of some dialect words included, provides an invaluable witness to the English language as it existed in the second half of the 15th Century, and can claim an honourable place in the roll of famous lexicographers that stretches through Johnson and Murray into our own age.

— Christopher Wright

== See also ==
- Promptorium parvulorum
- Manipulus Vocabulorum
