= Name of Turkey =

The name for the country Turkey is derived (via Old French Turquie) from the Medieval Latin Turchia, Turquia, from Medieval Greek Τουρκία, itself being Τούρκος (borrowed into Latin as Turcus, 'A Turk, Turkish'). It is first recorded in Middle English (as Turkye, Torke, later Turkie, Turky), attested in Chaucer, c. 1369. The Ottoman Empire was commonly referred to as Turkey or the Turkish Empire among its contemporaries. The word ultimately originates from the autonym Türk, first recorded in the Bugut inscription (as in its plural form türküt) and the Hüis Tolgoi Inscription (as türǖg) of the 6th century, and later, in the Orkhon inscriptions and the Tariat inscriptions (as both türük and türk) (𐱅𐰇𐰼𐰜) of the 8th century.

In 2022, the Turkish government requested the United Nations and other international organizations to use Türkiye officially in English, to which they agreed. While Türkiye is used by international organizations and national governments, Turkey remains the common and conventional English name.

== Toponymy ==
The English name of Turkey (from Medieval Latin Turchia/Turquia) means "land of the Turks". Middle English usage of Turkye is attested to in an early work by Chaucer called The Book of the Duchess (c. 1368). The phrase land of Torke is used in the 15th-century Digby Mysteries. Later usages can be found in the Dunbar poems, the 16th century Manipulus Vocabulorum ("Turkie, Tartaria") and Francis Bacon's Sylva Sylvarum (Turky). The modern spelling "Turkey" dates back to at least 1719.

=== Official name ===
The Government of the Grand National Assembly adopted the names State of Turkey (Türkiye Devleti) or simply Turkey (Türkiye). With the Treaty of Alexandropol in 1920, the name Türkiye entered international documents for the first time. In the treaty signed with Afghanistan in 1921, the expression Devlet-i Âliyye-i Türkiyye ("Sublime Turkish State") was used, likened to the Ottoman Empire's name.

Upon the proclamation of the republic on 29 October 1923, the name Türkiye Cumhuriyeti was adopted. The official name in English was Republic of Turkey. In 2022, the Turkish government requested, and the UN adopted, the official English name as Republic of Türkiye. Though unofficial, the term Turkish Republic is sometimes used in descriptive, historic, or academic contexts.

At a press briefing on 5 January 2023, a US State Department spokesperson announced that:

the Board on Geographic Names retained both "Turkey" and "Republic of Turkey", the previous spelling, as conventional names, as these are more widely understood by the American public. The department will use the spelling that you saw today [Türkiye] in most of our formal diplomatic and bilateral contexts, including in public communications, but the conventional name can also be used if it is in furtherance of broader public understanding.

=== Presidential circular on use of Türkiye ===
On 4 December 2021, President Recep Tayyip Erdoğan issued a presidential circular calling for exports to be labelled as being "Made in Türkiye". The circular also said that in relation to other governmental communications, "necessary sensitivity will be shown on the use of the phrase 'Türkiye' instead of phrases such as 'Turkey,' 'Türkei,' 'Turquie' etc." The official reason given in the circular for preferring Türkiye was that it "represents and expresses the culture, civilisation, and values of the Turkish nation in the best way". According to Turkish state broadcaster TRT, it was also to avoid a pejorative association with the bird that shares the same name in the English language.

It was reported in January 2022 that the government planned to register Türkiye with the United Nations. According to the state-run TRT World, Foreign Minister Mevlüt Çavuşoğlu sent letters to the UN and other international organisations on 31 May 2022, requesting that they use Türkiye. The UN agreed and implemented the name change.

In concordance with Turkish orthography, the preferred all caps spelling of the endonym is TÜRKİYE, written with a dotted capital I.

=== Turkic sources ===
The first recorded use of the term "Türk" or "Türük" as an autonym is contained in the Old Turkic inscriptions of the Göktürks (Celestial Turks) of Central Asia (c. AD 735). The Turkic self-designation Türk is attested to reference to the Göktürks in the 6th century AD. A letter by Ishbara Qaghan to Emperor Wen of Sui in 585 described him as "the Great Turk Khan."

=== Chinese sources ===
An early form of the same name may be reflected in the form of tie-le (鐵勒) or tu-jue (突厥), a name given by the Chinese to the people living south of the Altai Mountains of Central Asia as early as 177 BC. The Chinese Book of Zhou (7th century) presents an etymology of the name Turk as derived from "helmet" by explaining the name to come from the shape of a mountain on which the Chinese worked in the Altai Mountains.

=== Greek and Latin sources ===
Pomponius Mela refers to the "Turcae" in the forests north of the Sea of Azov, and Pliny the Elder lists the "Tyrcae" among the people of the same area. The Greek name, Tourkia (Greek: Τουρκία) was used by the Byzantine emperor and scholar Constantine VII Porphyrogenitus in his book De Administrando Imperio, though in his use, "Turks" always referred to Magyars and Hungary was called Tourkia (Land of the Turks). Similarly, the medieval Khazar Khaganate, a Turkic state on the northern shores of the Black and Caspian seas, was also referred to as Tourkia in Byzantine sources. However, the Byzantines later began using this name to define the Seljuk-controlled parts of Anatolia in the centuries that followed the Battle of Manzikert in 1071. The medieval Greek and Latin terms did not designate the same geographic area now known as Turkey. Instead, they were mostly synonymous with Tartary, a term including Khazaria and the other khaganates of the Central Asian steppe, until the appearance of the Seljuks and the rise of the Ottoman Empire in the 14th century, reflecting the progress of the Turkic expansion. However, the term Tartary itself was a misnomer which was constantly used by the Europeans to refer the realms of Turkic peoples and Turkicized Mongols until the mid-19th century.

=== Arabic sources ===
The Arabic cognate Turkiyya (Arabic: تركية) in the form ad-Dawlat at-Turkiyya (Arabic: الدولة التركية "State of the Turks" or "the Turkish State") was historically used as an official name for the medieval Mamluk Sultanate which covered Egypt, Palestine, Lebanon, Syria, Hejaz and Cyrenaica. (Note: The Arabic name for the modern Turkish state is slightly different, Turkiyā (تركيا).)

== See also ==
- Toponyms of Turkey
- Turkestan
- Turan
- Turki
- Names of Anatolia
