= Cikta =

Breed of sheep

The Cikta is a breed of domestic sheep from Hungary. In the 18th century, this breed was brought to Hungary by German settlers. This breed grows wool but is primarily raised for meat. The Cikta belong in the Mountain Group of sheep breeds.

== Characteristics ==
The Cikta is white (unicolored). Rams have horns and ewes are polled (hornless). Typically, horns are small or knob-like. Generally, this breed is adaptable to extreme climates. The ears are erect.

At maturity, rams weigh 37 kg (82 lb) and ewes weigh 45 kg (99 lb). At the withers, rams grow to 55 cm (22 in) and ewes to 47 cm (19 in). Ewes have an average 1.1 lambs per litter.
