= Manipulus Vocabulorum =

16th century English-to-Latin dictionary

The Manipulus Vocabulorum (lit. 'Handful of Words') is an English-to-Latin dictionary that was produced in the 16th century; it is the first English rhyming dictionary. The Manipulus Vocabulorum was published by Peter Levens in 1570. It was reprinted in parallel editions in 1867 by the Camden Society, the Early English Text Society, and the Philological Society.
