= Budakeszi District =

Coordinates: 47.4667°N 18.9667°E

Budakeszi District Budakeszi járás
- Districts of Hungary
- Coat of arms

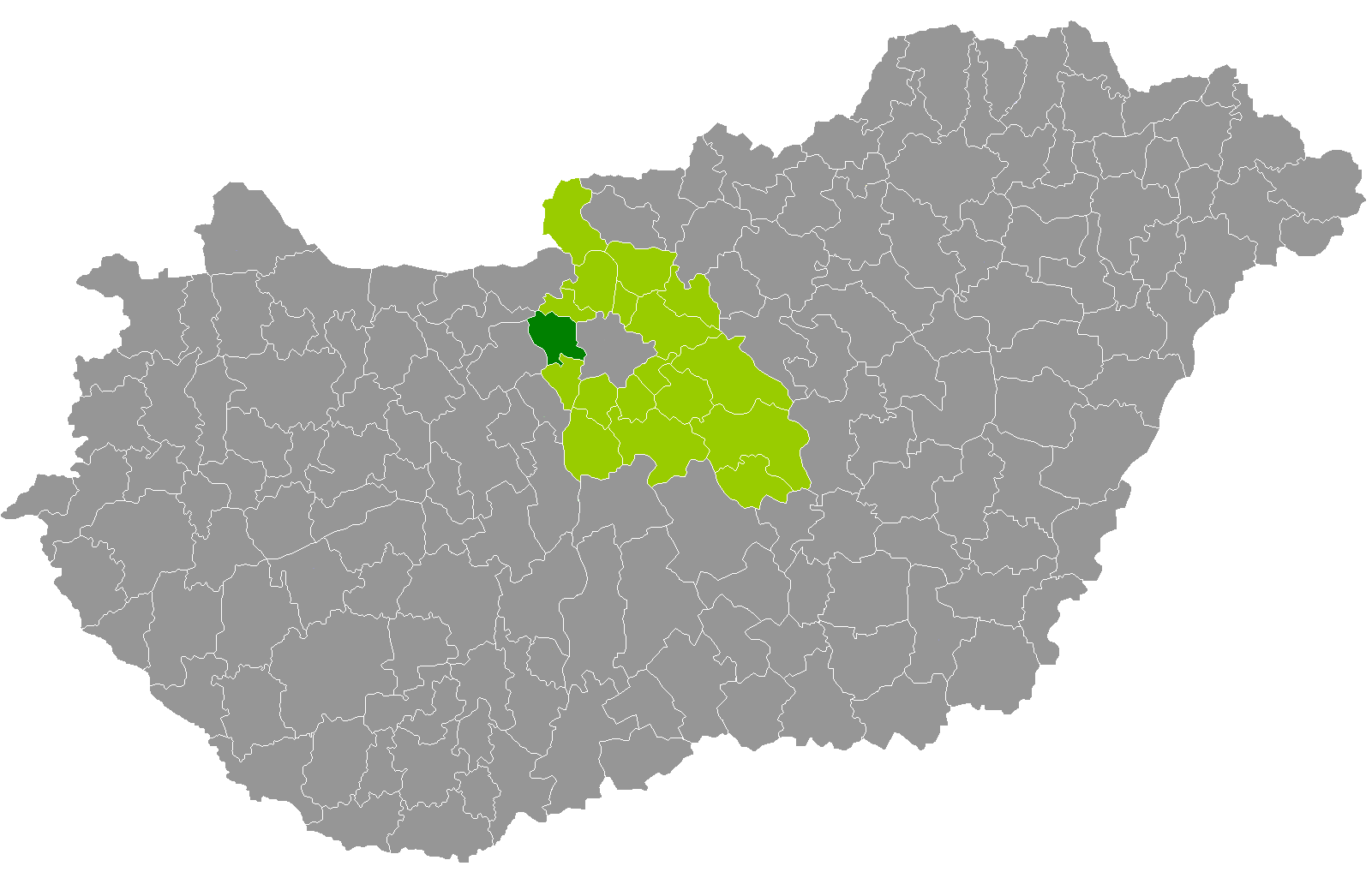
- Budakeszi District within Hungary and Pest County.
- Country: Hungary
- County: Pest
- District seat: Budakeszi

Area
  - Total: 288.95 km^{2} (111.56 sq mi)
  - Rank: 12th in Pest

Population (2011 census)
  - Total: 83,670
  - Rank: 5th in Pest
  - Density: 290/km^{2} (750/sq mi)

Budakeszi (Hungarian: Budakeszi járás) is a district in western part of Pest County. Budakeszi is also the name of the town where the district seat is found. The district is located in the Central Hungary Statistical Region.

== Geography ==
Budakeszi District borders with Pilisvörösvár District to the north, Budapest to the east, Érd District to the south, Bicske District (Fejér County) to the west, Tatabánya District (Komárom-Esztergom County) to the northwest. The number of the inhabited places in Budakeszi District is 12.

== Municipalities ==
The district has 4 towns, 1 large village and 7 villages. (ordered by population, as of 1 January 2013)

- **Biatorbágy** (12,638)
- Budajenő (1,858)
- **Budakeszi** (13,707) – district seat
- **Budaörs** (27,306)
- Herceghalom (2,174)
- Nagykovácsi (6,912)
- Páty (6,974)
- Perbál (2,078)
- Remeteszőlős (755)
- Telki (3,707)
- Tök (1,338)
- **Zsámbék** (5,199)

The municipalities in bold are cities, the municipality in italics is a large village.

== Demographics ==
Religion in Budakeszi District (2011 census)
1. Catholic Church (34.4%)
2. Greek Catholicism (1.10%)
3. Calvinism (11.6%)
4. Lutheranism (1.40%)
5. Orthodoxy (0.10%)
6. Judaism (0.20%)
7. Other religions (2.30%)
8. Non-religious (17.5%)
9. Atheists (2.50%)
10. Undeclared (28.9%)

In 2011, it had a population of 83,670 and the population density was 290/km².

| Year | County population | Change |
|---|---|---|
| 2011 | 83,670 | n/a |

=== Ethnicity ===
Besides Hungarian majority, the main minorities are the German (approx. 3,700), Roma and Romanian (400), Russian (250) and Slovak (150).

Total population (2011 census): 83,670
Ethnic groups (2011 census): Identified themselves: 79,752 persons:

- Hungarians: 72,343 (90.71%)
- Germans: 3,702 (4.64%)
- Others and indefinable: 3,707 (4.64%)

Approx. 4,000 persons in Budakeszi District did not declare their ethnic group at the 2011 census.

=== Religion ===
Religious adherence in the county according to 2011 census:

- Catholic – 29,681 (Roman Catholic – 28,763; Greek Catholic – 904);
- Reformed – 9,708;
- Evangelical – 1,160;
- Orthodox – 123;
- Judaism – 164;
- other religions – 1,934;
- Non-religious – 14,614;
- Atheism – 2,060;
- Undeclared – 24,226.

== Gallery ==
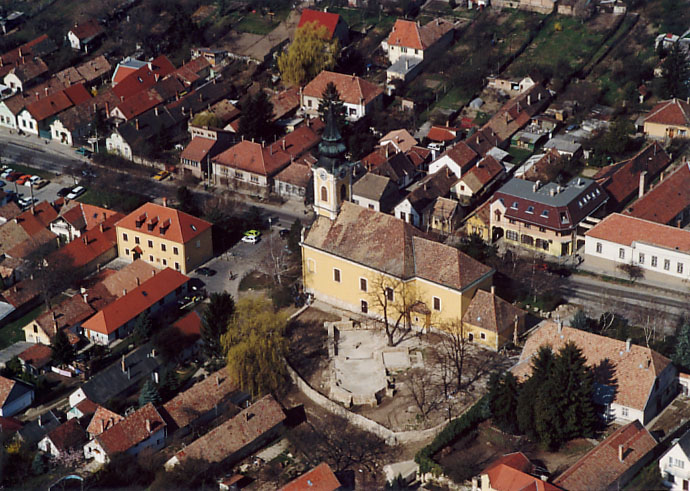
Downtown of Budakeszi

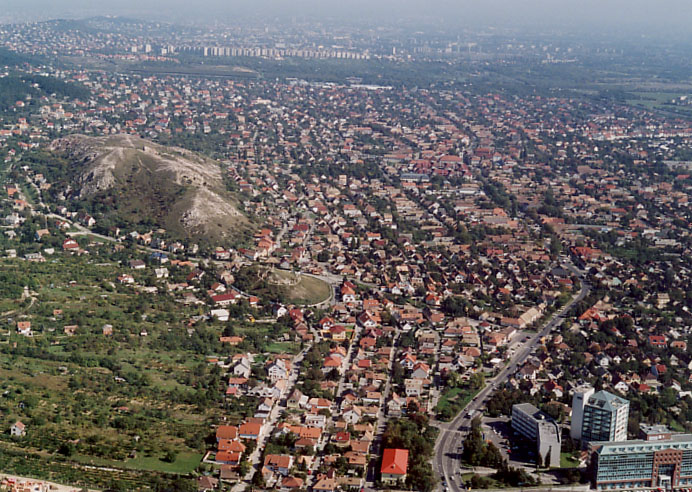
Aerial view of Budaörs

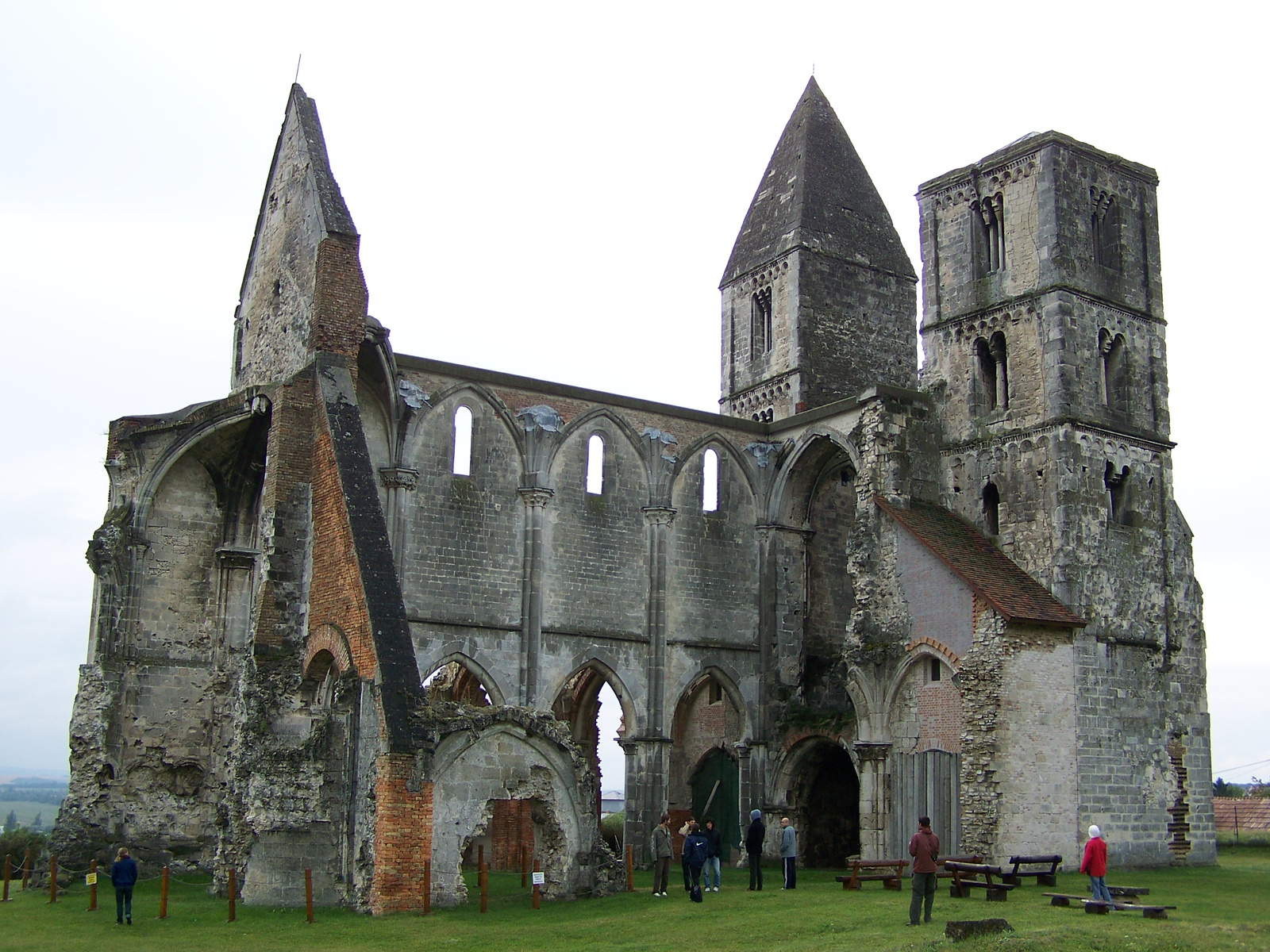
Zsámbék Premontre monastery church

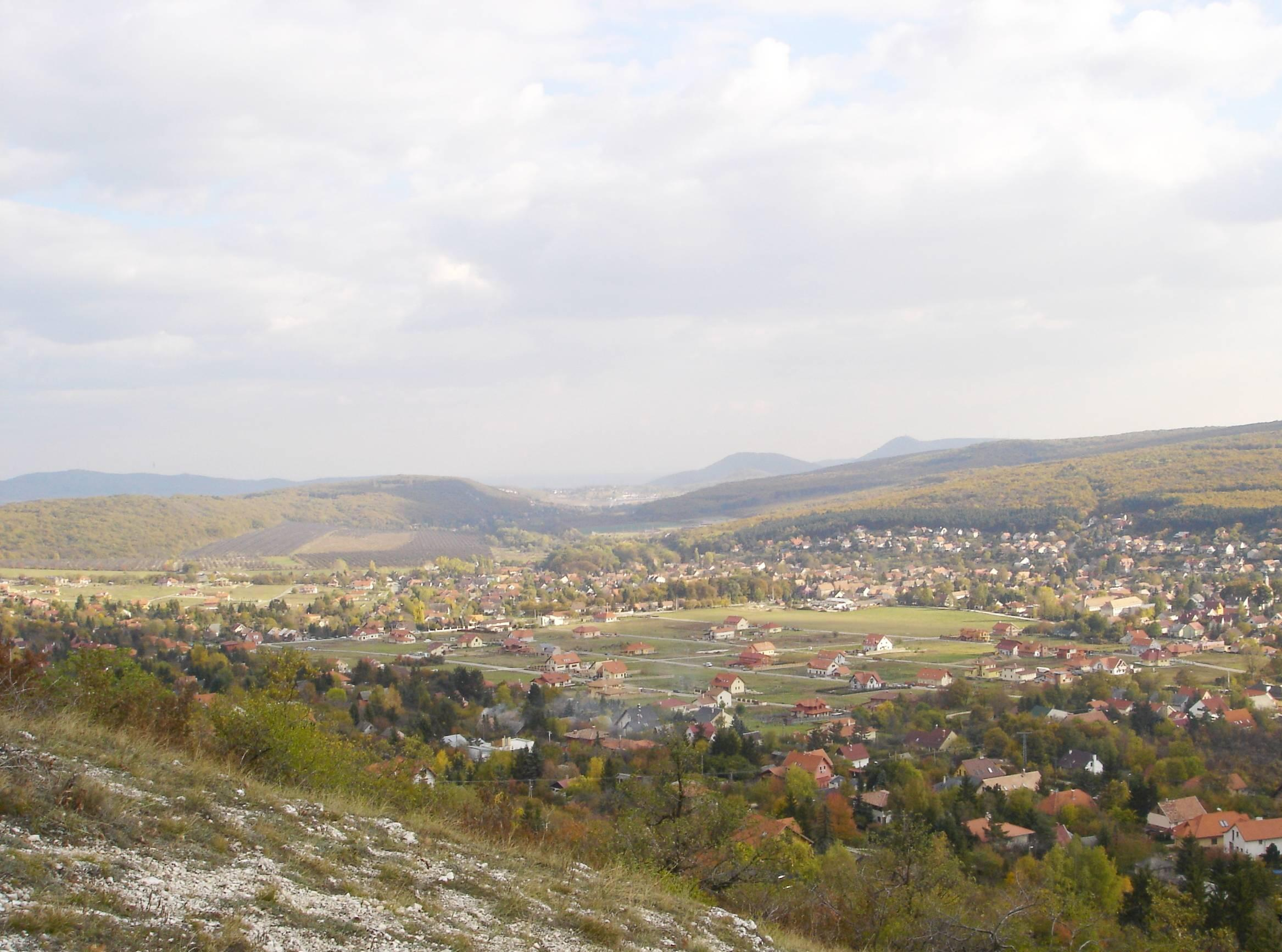
Panorama of Nagykovácsi

== See also ==
- List of cities and towns in Hungary
