= Budapest metropolitan area =

Urban conglomeration in Hungary

Budapest Metropolitan Area Budapesti agglomeráció
- Metropolitan area
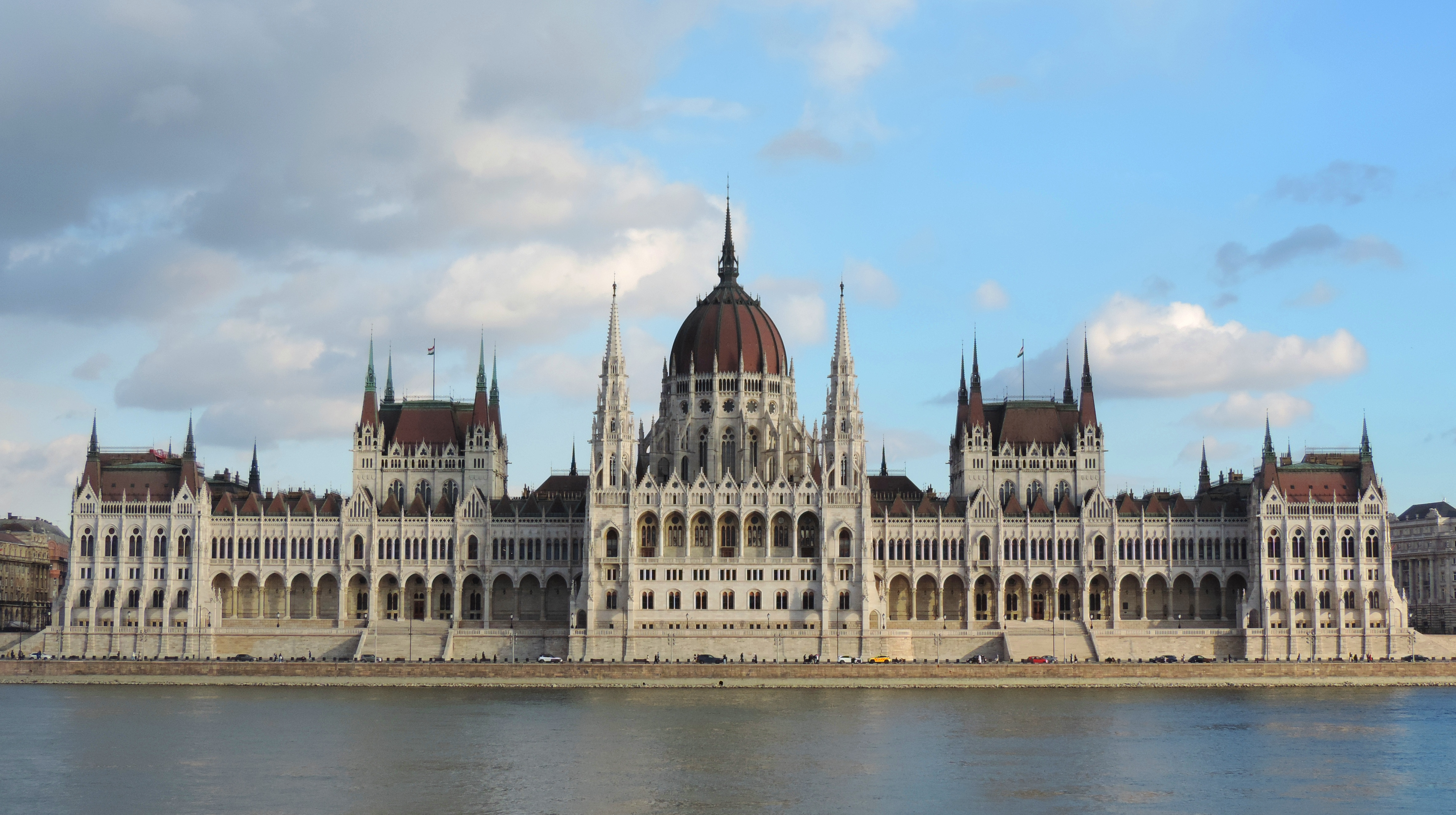
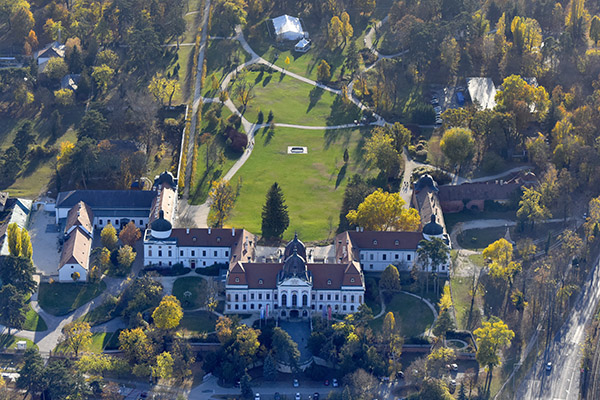
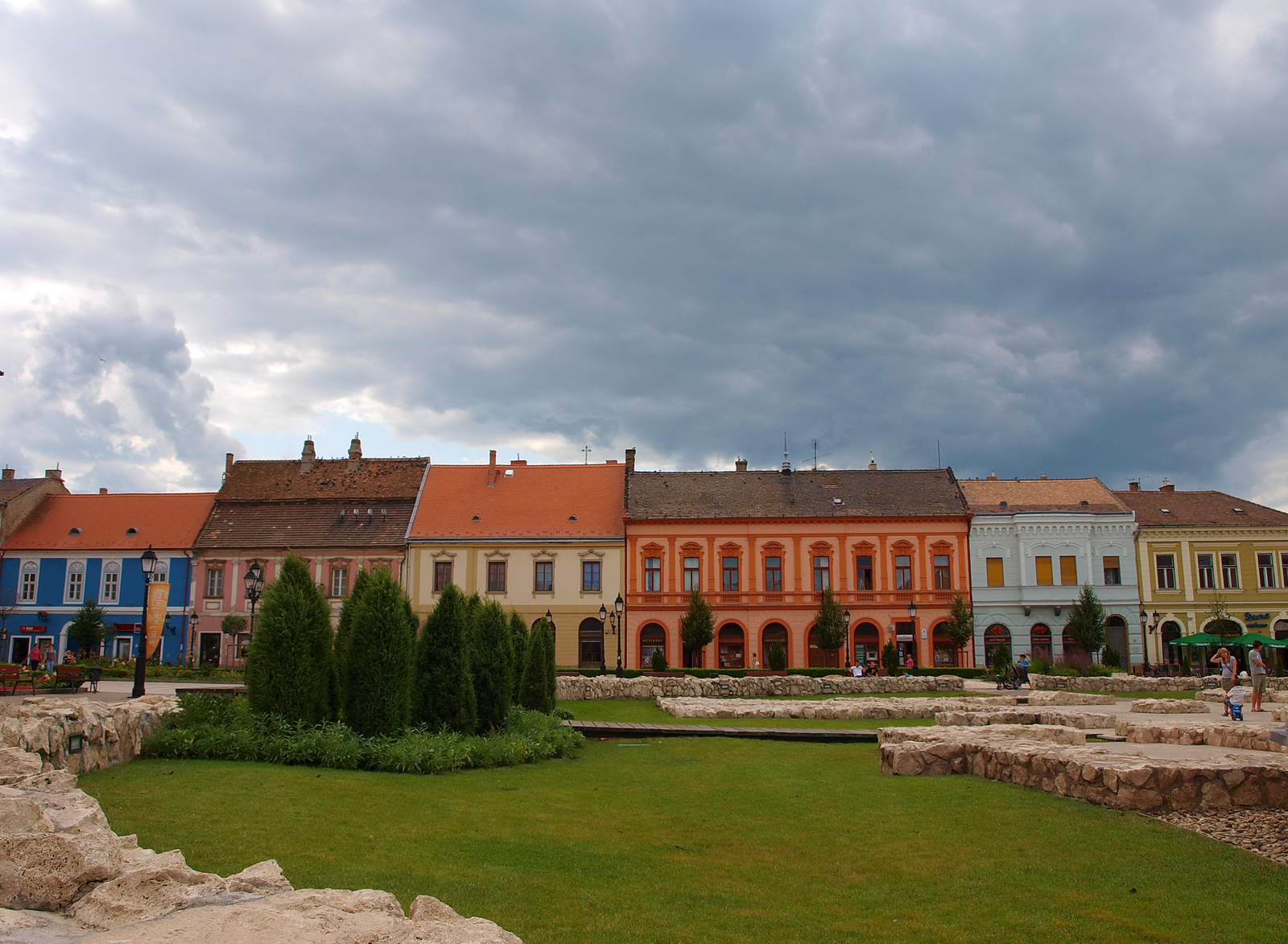
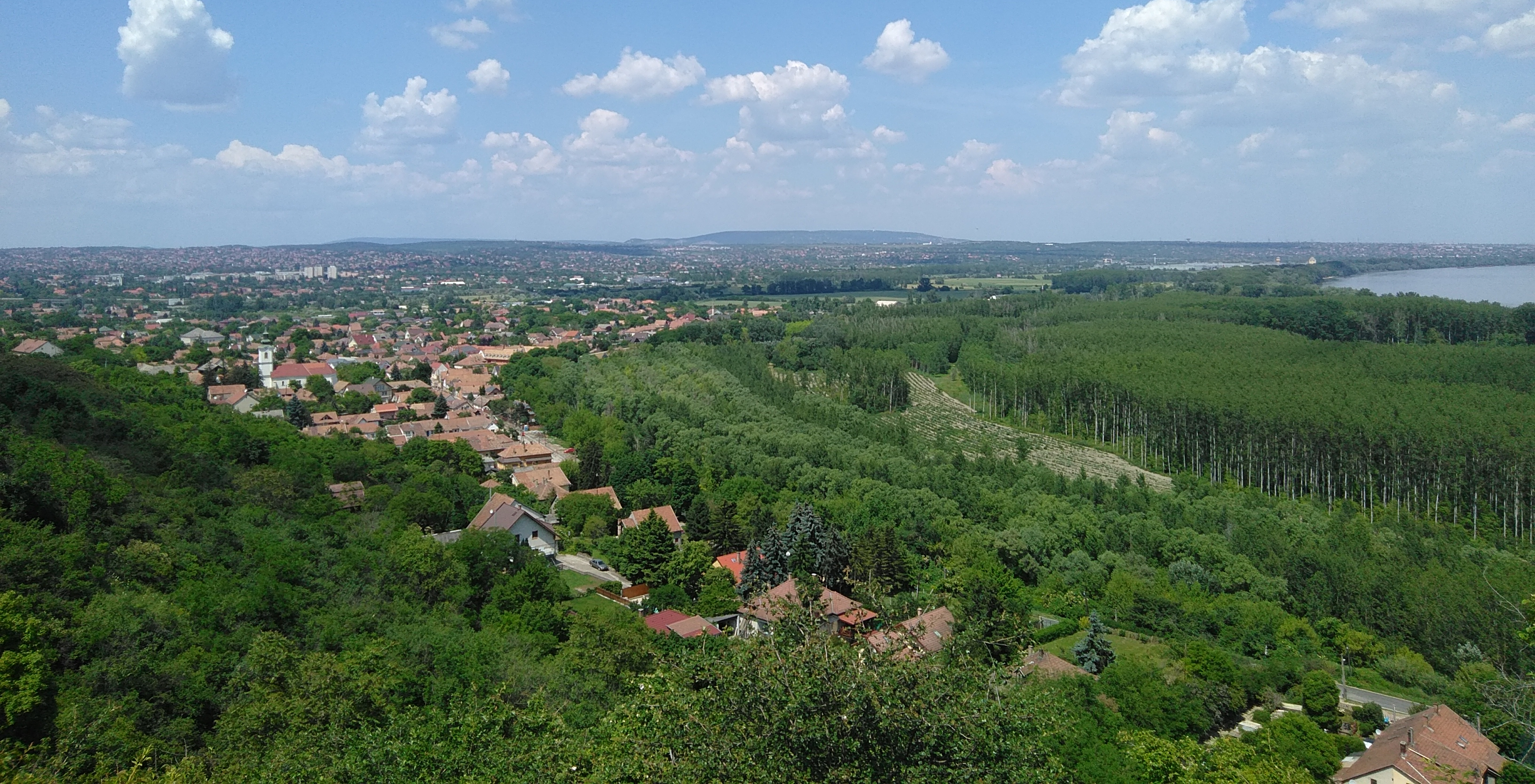
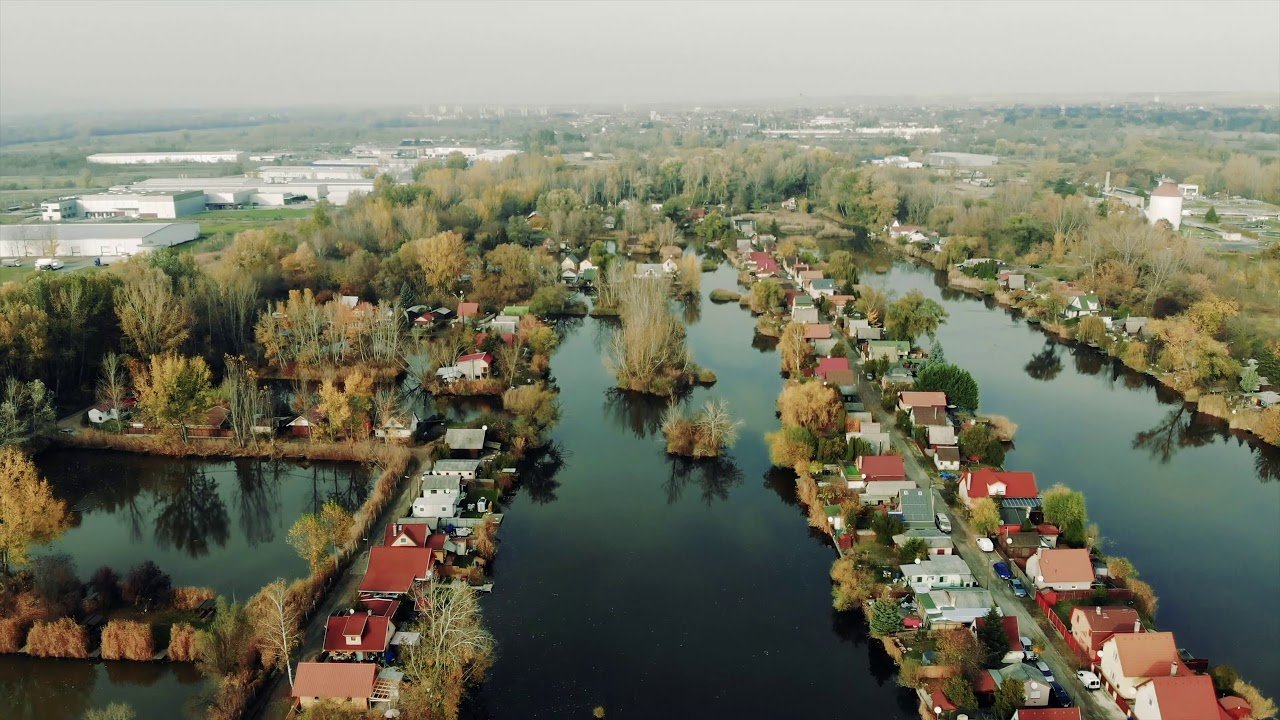
- From top, left to right: Hungarian Parliament Building; Gödöllő; Vác; Érd; Dunakeszi
- Interactive map of Budapest Metropolitan Area
- Country: Hungary

Area
  - Total: 2,541 km^{2} (981 sq mi)

Population (2025)
  - Total: 2,596,842
  - Density: 1,022/km^{2} (2,647/sq mi)

GDP
  - Total: US$156,565,391,794 (2022, PPP)
  - Per capita: US$70,092 (2022, PPP)

The Budapest agglomeration is an urban conglomeration with Budapest as its center, which encompasses the Hungarian capital city and the surrounding settlements closely tied to it economically, infrastructurally, in the labor market, and in services. The Budapest agglomeration is a monocentric conglomeration: Budapest alone accounts for almost two-thirds of the agglomeration's population, while the second largest settlement, Érd, has a population amounting to 4% of Budapest’s. Considering population density, there is a roughly consistent decrease from the center toward the periphery.

The official list of the 81 settlements belonging to the Budapest agglomeration is included in the 2005 Act LXIV, which establishes the spatial planning of the Budapest agglomeration. In 2007, these 81 settlements had a total population of 2,457,787, and in 2023 it was already 2,577,384, representing nearly one-quarter of Hungary’s population. Of this, the total population of settlements around the capital was 755,290 in 2007 and 906,380 in 2023.

== History ==
The history of the Budapest agglomeration begins in 1850. Due to the transformation of civil society and the acceleration of modernization and economic processes, the population of Budapest began to grow at a rapid pace. The population of Budapest was 302,000 in 1870 and 861,000 in 1900. Budapest became an industrial, transportation, and financial center. Thanks to these processes, the agglomeration of Budapest began.

The development of the Budapest agglomeration can be divided into four phases. The first phase covers one or two decades before 1850. Adjoining Pest-Buda and Óbuda, two small landed settlements were established: Újpest and Albertfalva. Újpest achieved municipal status in 1840. These settlements were primarily inhabited by journeymans not accepted into the guilds of Pest-Buda. German-speaking populations were settled around Buda and Óbuda, creating German-majority settlements such as Budakalász, Budakeszi, Budafok, Budaörs, Nagykovácsi, Solymár, Tétény, and Üröm. These settlements were hardly affected by agglomeration in the following decades, mainly due to the isolation caused by the Buda Hills and the absence of parcellable large estates. On the Pest side, lands were owned by two large landowners: in the southeast, part of today’s Kispest, Pestszenterzsébet, Pestszentlőrinc, and Soroksár belonged to the Grassalkovich family, while in the north, today's Újpest and Rákospalota belonged to the Károlyi family.

The second phase lasted from 1850 to 1870. During these two decades, absolutism slowed urban development, but the future capital created the basic conditions for development, such as the beginning of the railway network, the establishment of the banking system, laying the foundations of industrial production, and creating a commercial center for agricultural products. As a result, agglomeration began to a limited extent, mainly in the northern areas of Pest. Újpest stood out, where the population increased eightfold in 30 years. Besides Újpest, the population also grew in Rákospalota and Rákoskeresztúr to a smaller extent. These settlements developed a city-supplying agricultural economy, producing vegetables, fruits, milk, and dairy products. The city-supplying zone was established. The labor attraction of the triple city (Pest, Buda, Óbuda) was still insignificant. Regular daily commuting conditions were not yet in place. Only seasonal workers came to the triple city for vineyard work and construction, staying in mass accommodations within the city boundaries. Inns appeared near the city limits, along with holiday settlements and villas on the Buda side.

The third phase lasted from 1870 to 1895. After the unification of the city, Budapest began to develop rapidly. Between 1870 and 1890, more than 500,000 people moved to Budapest. This dynamic population growth extended beyond the city limits, affecting suburban settlements. Workers and industry partially settled in the suburbs, and daily commuting appeared by the end of the century. The former Grassalkovich estate south of Pest was parceled, starting settlement. The first parcellings began in today’s Kispest and Pestszenterzsébet. The first settlers were mainly poorer craftsmen, journeymen, railway workers, and lower-level clerks. In 1887, the Ráckeve HÉV was inaugurated, triggering a significant immigration wave in southern Pest. Soroksár began to be populated. In Újpest, small-scale industry and factory production characterized the area; its population was 6,000 in 1870 and 42,000 by 1900. By the end of the 19th century, suburbs developed as settlements along city borders, primarily inhabited by craftsmen and small entrepreneurs working for Budapest markets. Budapest’s influence increasingly affected certain suburbs, e.g., Rákospalota transformed from an agrarian-village settlement into a garden suburb. Officials, employees, and railway workers settled in Rákospalota. In contrast, most of Soroksár’s population still relied on agriculture, and the number of newcomers was negligible. Similar situations occurred in Rákoscsaba, Cinkota, Békásmegyer, and Pesthidegkút. Tétény, Rákoskeresztúr, and Budafok developed similarly to Rákospalota and became Budapest suburbs by the end of the century. In Budafok, viticulture, beer production, and food industry replaced agriculture. Budapest’s influence extended beyond today’s city limits, with the most significant economic and social impact on Pécel, Csömör, and Törökbálint. The most substantial population growth occurred in Budaörs, Telki, and Üröm. On the Pest side, agricultural and industrial activities prevailed, while on the Buda side, industry and leisure activities dominated.

The fourth phase lasted from 1895 to 1950. Suburban public transport began to be established. Omnibus routes were first launched to Újpest and Kispest. Alongside the Ráckeve HÉV, the Szentendre HÉV, the Tétény tram, and the Gödöllő and Csömör HÉVs were opened. Between 1900 and 1907, tram lines were built connecting suburbs including Újpest, Rákospalota, Kispest, and Pesterzsébet. The largest commuting flows were towards the northern suburbs of Újpest and Rákospalota. The development of suburban transport had a massive impact on the population and social structure of the settlements. Masses seeking work in the city’s industrial plants settled outside Budapest’s borders, along with the poorer urban population. Not only poorer classes moved outward; thanks to rapid public transport, clerks also moved, primarily to Rákospalota and Pestszentlőrinc. The social composition of suburbs changed: industrial workers replaced former small-scale craftsmen, railway workers, and agricultural laborers. After 1900, the role of local industry in suburbs became stronger. Investors increasingly relocated factories to suburbs due to more favorable conditions (lower local taxes, cheaper real estate). Four major industrial areas emerged: in Újpest (leather and carpentry, machinery, light bulbs, and pharmaceuticals), in Rákospalota and Kispest–Pesterzsébet–Pestszentlőrinc (railway machinery), and in Csepel (Weiss Manfréd Steel and Metal Works). By 1910, 75% of Csepel’s population worked in industry. Settlements started developing along Rákosmente, e.g., Sashalom, Rákosliget, and Rákoshegy. Due to mass migration, the proportion of local-born residents in suburbs never exceeded 25%. Infrastructure could not keep up with rapid settlement, so suburbs mainly had unpaved streets, a lack of sewer and water networks, and sparse lighting. Significant infrastructure development began only in the 1920s. The idea of “Greater Budapest” was proposed in 1908 by István Bárczy, mayor of Budapest, and Ferenc Harrer, city clerk, suggesting that neighboring settlements should be annexed to Budapest. After World War I, Budapest’s growth stalled, but the suburban settlements continued to increase. The impoverished urban bourgeoisie and clerks, along with job-seekers from distant regions, also moved to the suburbs. Between the two world wars, textile factories settled in suburban settlements, such as Hazai Fésüsfonó és Szövőgyár, Unió textile factory, and Magyar Posztógyár Rt. Suburban public transport was expanded to Pesthidegkút, Budakeszi, Budaörs, Solymár, and Üröm. Suburbs developed continuously, gaining city status: Kispest (1922), Pesterzsébet (1923), Rákospalota, Budafok (1926), and Pestszentlőrinc (1936). In 1937, the idea of “Greater Budapest” resurfaced but was postponed due to World War II. Among the suburbs, Soroksár, Nagytétény, and Rákoscsaba lagged behind, with almost no incoming population; nearly 20% of locals still worked in agriculture. From the 1920s, stronger agglomeration began in Dunakeszi and surrounding areas, along the Budapest–Vác railway line, and towards the Great Plain: Isaszeg, Pécel, Ecser, Maglód, Gyömrő, Üllő, Vecsés, Dunaharaszti, and Tököl. On the Buda side, settlements isolated by the Buda Hills experienced this process slowly; only Érd saw significant population growth.

In 1950, seven cities and 16 large villages were annexed to Budapest, creating Greater Budapest. However, several suburbs remained independent settlements, e.g., Dunakeszi, Fót, Csömör, Kistarcsa, Pécel, Maglód, Vecsés, Gyál, Dunaharaszti, Szigetszentmiklós, Érd, Budaörs, Budakeszi, Solymár, Üröm, and Budakalász. After World War II, due to accelerated economic development, Budapest’s labor demand increased. The capital could not accommodate part of the incoming population, forcing many to settle in suburbs. During the Kádár regime, migration to the capital was administratively restricted. This accelerated suburban agglomeration. Rapid population growth in the 1950s and 1960s transformed suburbs into residential areas. By 1970, in some suburbs, over 80% of residents commuted to the capital. The residential area of Budapest on the Pest side extended far, to Hatvan, Jászberény, Újszász, Szolnok. Most immigrants to suburbs came from the countryside, while those moving out of Budapest relocated mainly to settlements along the Danube and the Buda Hills. The boundaries of the Budapest agglomeration were officially delineated for the first time in 1971, including 43 settlements. Suburban settlements with state industry fared better due to state housing construction. By the 1980s, signs of economic decline appeared, Budapest’s labor demand decreased, fewer newcomers arrived, and population stagnation occurred, also affecting suburbs. After the transition, these trends intensified in the 1990s, but most suburban settlements experienced population growth, partly due to people relocating from Budapest. In the 1980s, suburbanization began, with entrepreneurs and intellectuals moving primarily to suburban settlements. Following the political transition, in the 1990s and 2000s, numerous businesses were founded in suburbs, improving the economic situation of settlements. By then, the lower strata of the middle class also participated in suburbanization. In 2005, the settlements belonging to the Budapest agglomeration were codified by law, currently totaling 81 settlements.

During the 2020 COVID-19 pandemic, the number of people temporarily moving from Budapest to the agglomeration increased, exacerbating serious problems in suburban settlements due to overcrowding. Infrastructure development lagged behind rapid population growth, including utility provision, overburdened road network reconstruction, and the construction of new public institutions. The number of commuters and vehicles increased, causing conflicts between old and newly arrived residents in several suburban settlements.

Section 13 § (1) d) of the 2023 Act CII on spatial development established the Budapest Agglomeration Development Council as a highlighted development council.

== Sectors ==
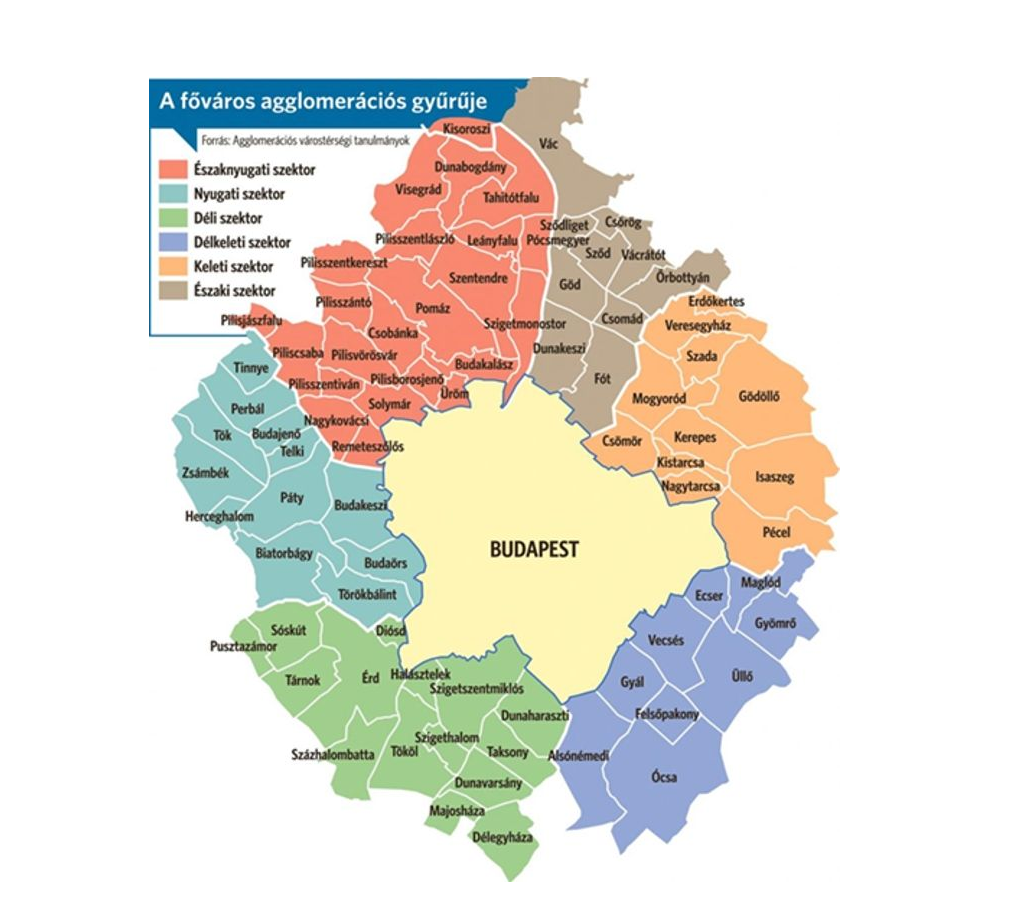
Sectors of the Budapest metropolitan area

The Budapest metropolitan area is divided into six sectors: northern, eastern, southeastern, southern, western, and northwestern. The sectors differ in population, area, economy, and social composition. The southern sector is the most populous, while the western sector is the least dense. The largest sector is the northwestern, while the smallest is the northern. Between 2011 and 2023, most people moved to the southern sector, and the fewest to the southeastern. Most highly educated residents live in the northwestern sector, while the fewest live in the southeastern. Local tax revenues are highest in the western and northwestern sectors and lowest in the southeastern sector.

=== Northern sector ===
Population (2023): 142,717 (5.5% of metropolitan population), increased by 11,188 since 2011. Density: 599/km². Area: 238.24 km². Major town: Dunakeszi. Minority population: 12,832 (8.9%), mostly German, Roma, Slovak.

=== Eastern sector ===
Population (2023): 147,848 (5.7%), increase of 34,335 since 2011. Density: 468/km². Area: 315.83 km². Major town: Gödöllő. Minority population: 14,102 (9.5%), mostly Romanian, Roma, Slovak.

=== Southeastern sector ===
Population (2023): 114,419 (4.4%), increase of 10,290 since 2011. Density: 361/km². Area: 317.25 km². Major town: Gyál. Minority population: 11,402 (8%), mostly German, Roma, Romanian.

=== Southern sector ===
Population (2023): 243,997 (9.5%), increase of 39,390 since 2011. Density: 661/km². Area: 368.94 km². Major town: Érd. Minority population: 23,139 (9.5%), mostly German, Roma, Romanian.

=== Western sector ===
Population (2023): 104,200 (4%), increase of 13,956 since 2011. Density: 343/km². Area: 303.92 km². Major town: Budaörs. Minority population: 23,100 (13%), mostly German, Ukrainian, Roma.

=== Northwestern sector ===
Population (2023): 153,199 (5.9%), increase of 15,929 since 2011. Density: 325/km². Area: 471.85 km². Major town: Szentendre. Minority population: 23,100 (15.1%), mostly German, Slovak, Roma.

== List of settlements by sector ==
- Northern Sector
  - Csomád
  - Csörög
  - Dunakeszi
  - Fót
  - Göd
  - Őrbottyán
  - Sződ
  - Sződliget
  - Vác
  - Vácrátót
- Eastern Sector
  - Csömör
  - Erdőkertes
  - Gödöllő
  - Isaszeg
  - Kerepes
  - Kistarcsa
  - Mogyoród
  - Nagytarcsa
  - Pécel
  - Szada
  - Veresegyház
- Southeastern Sector
  - Alsónémedi
  - Ecser
  - Felsőpakony
  - Gyál
  - Gyömrő
  - Maglód
  - Ócsa
  - Üllő
  - Vecsés
- Southern Sector
  - Délegyháza
  - Diósd
  - Dunaharaszti
  - Dunavarsány
  - Érd
  - Halásztelek
  - Majosháza
  - Pusztazámor
  - Sóskút
  - Százhalombatta
  - Szigethalom
  - Szigetszentmiklós
  - Taksony
  - Tárnok
  - Tököl

- Western Sector
  - Biatorbágy
  - Budajenő
  - Budakeszi
  - Budaörs
  - Herceghalom
  - Páty
  - Perbál
  - Telki
  - Tinnye
  - Tök
  - Törökbálint
  - Zsámbék
- Northwestern Sector
  - Budakalász
  - Csobánka
  - Dunabogdány
  - Kisoroszi
  - Leányfalu
  - Nagykovácsi
  - Pilisborosjenő
  - Piliscsaba
  - Pilisjászfalu
  - Pilisvörösvár
  - Pilisszántó
  - Pilisszentiván
  - Pilisszentkereszt
  - Pilisszentlászló
  - Pócsmegyer
  - Pomáz
  - Remeteszőlős
  - Solymár
  - Szentendre
  - Szigetmonostor
  - Tahitótfalu
  - Üröm
  - Visegrád

== Demographics ==
The Budapest metropolitan area’s population in 2023 is 2,577,384, accounting for roughly 24% of Hungary’s total population. Population growth has been concentrated in the southern and eastern sectors, largely due to suburbanization. Northern and northwestern sectors are more affluent and have higher proportions of residents with tertiary education, while southeastern sectors have lower income and educational levels.

== Economy ==
The Budapest metropolitan area is the economic hub of Hungary. Key sectors include finance, industry, services, and commerce. Northern and northwestern sectors host headquarters of multinational companies and higher-income residential areas. Southern and southeastern sectors are characterized by industrial zones and mixed residential development. Transport connections, including the M0 ring road, suburban railways (HÉV lines), and highways, facilitate commuting within the metropolitan area.

== Transport ==
Public transport in the metropolitan area is coordinated with Budapest’s system, including suburban HÉV lines, buses, and commuter rail services. Major roads and highways connect peripheral settlements to Budapest, with significant congestion along routes connecting southern and northern sectors.

== See also ==
- Budapest
- List of cities and towns in Hungary
- Suburbanization
