= Páty =

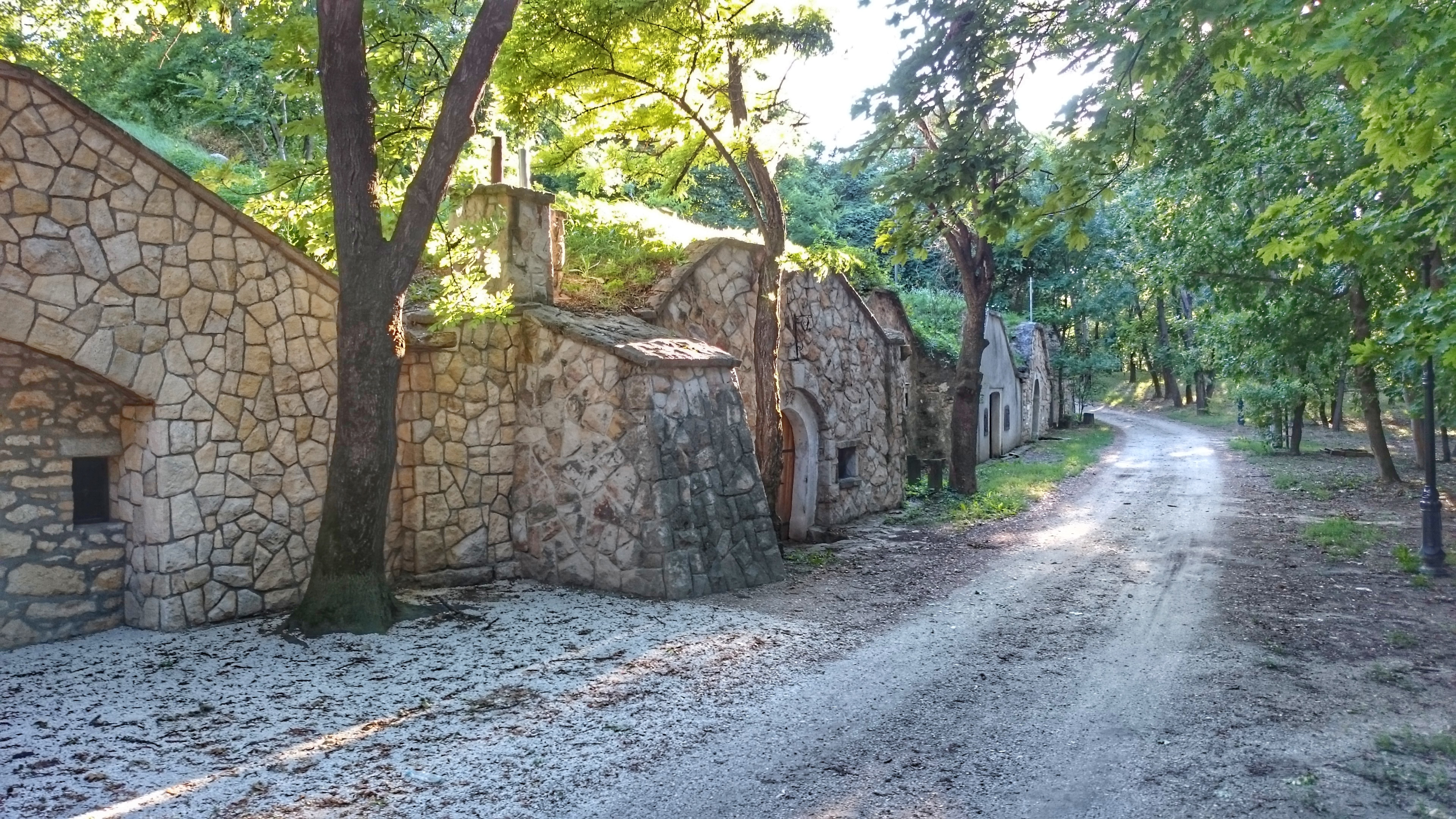
- Winecellar Hill

- Coat of arms

- Location of Páty in Hungary
- Coordinates: 47.51351°N 18.82468°E
- Country: Hungary
- Region: Central Hungary
- County: Pest
- Subregion: Budakeszi
- Rank: Village

Area
  - Total: 39.29 km^{2} (15.17 sq mi)

Population (2017)
  - Total: 7,476
  - Density: 190.3/km^{2} (492.8/sq mi)
- Time zone: UTC+1 (CET)
  - Summer (DST): UTC+2 (CEST)
- Postal code: 2071
- Area code: +36 23
- KSH code: 15024
- Website: www.paty.hu

Páty is a village in Pest county, Budapest metropolitan area, Hungary. It has a population of 7,476 (2018). The neighbouring villages are: Zsámbék, Tök, Budajenő, Telki, Nagykovácsi, Budakeszi, Biatorbágy and Herceghalom. The Zsambeki basin are bound by Mézes (Honey) valley which is called as the Gate of Páty also. The Paty-basin is 180 m over the sea level in general, but its outskirts reach 210–360 m high.

== Transport ==
=== Road ===
The village of Páty is located close to the Budapest-Budakeszi (road 8102)-Zsámbék (road 1102) line, Budapest-Vienna line (main road 1) and M1 motorway. Páty is also connected to Biatorbágy (road 81106) and Telki (road 11102).

=== Bus ===
The mass transit are operated by Volánbusz.

From Budapest, Széll Kálmán tér (Metro Line M2) via Budakeszi: 781, 782, 784, 785, 786, 787, 788, 789, 791 and 922B;

From Budapest, Kelenföld railway station (Metro Line M4): 773 and 774

Local Bus (to Biatorbágy railway station): KanyarGO

=== Train ===
The railway 1 (Budapest–Hegyeshalom–Rajka) also crosses the village. There is no railway stations. The closest railway station is Biatorbágy (6 kilometers from Páty). The railway station has P+R and B+R services. The station is operated by MÁV:

S10 (Győr) - Tatabánya - Kelenföld railway station (Metro Line M4) - Budapest-Déli Railway Terminal (Metro Line M2),

S12 Oroszlány - Tatabánya - Kelenföld railway station (Metro Line M4) - Budapest-Déli Railway Terminal (Metro Line M2) and

G10 Győr - Tatabánya - Kelenföld railway station (Metro Line M4) - Budapest Keleti railway station (Metro Line M2) (Metro Line M4)

== History ==
This place has been populated since ancient times. A great number of artefacts from the stone, copper and bronze ages can be found in different local collections and in the Hungarian National Museum.

According to inscribed stones from the Roman era, noble inhabitants of Aquincum liked and used the water of Főkút (the main spring), building up a spa around it and developing local plots of ground as a medium category farm.

The name of the village was first mentioned in a deed of gift issued in 1286 on the 5th Sunday after Fig Sunday.

After the Battle of Mohács (1526) Hungary was controlled by the Ottoman Empire, but in Páty the local population remained (except for some longer or shorter periods) unlike other villages in this part. The competence and industry of the local people in agriculture had a very important role in the survival of the village. Merchants of far countries came here regularly for steely wheat and smooth wine. Onion, fresh cherries, cheese and cottage cheese were sold in the market of Buda mainly.

The wine culture and production of the village was lost in the great 19th century European phylloxera epidemic, but the cellars of the old growers still have a fantastic atmosphere. The village was devastated in the "Wildkansas" tornado of 13 June 1924.

== Sights ==
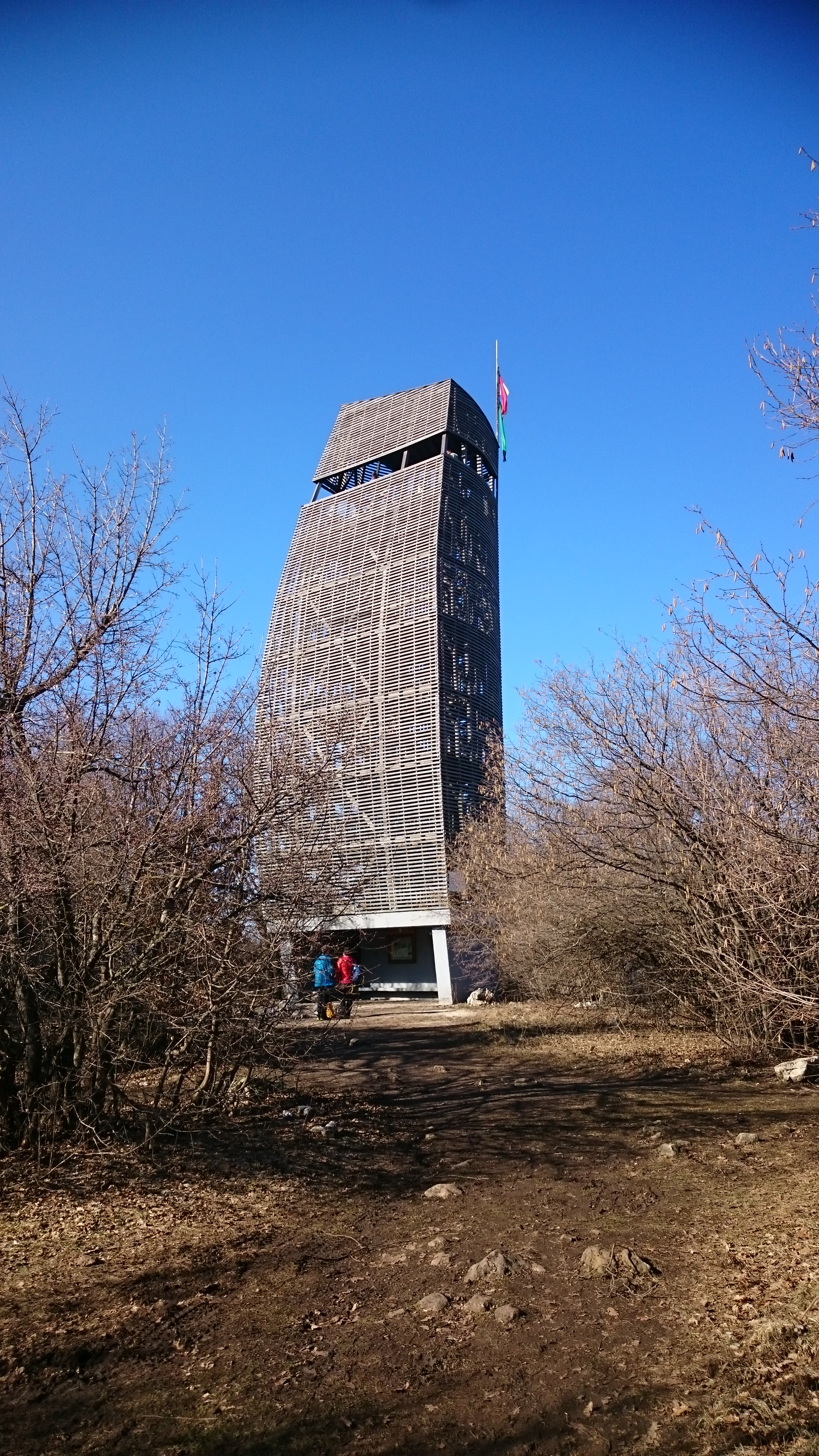
Csergezán Pál-viewpoint

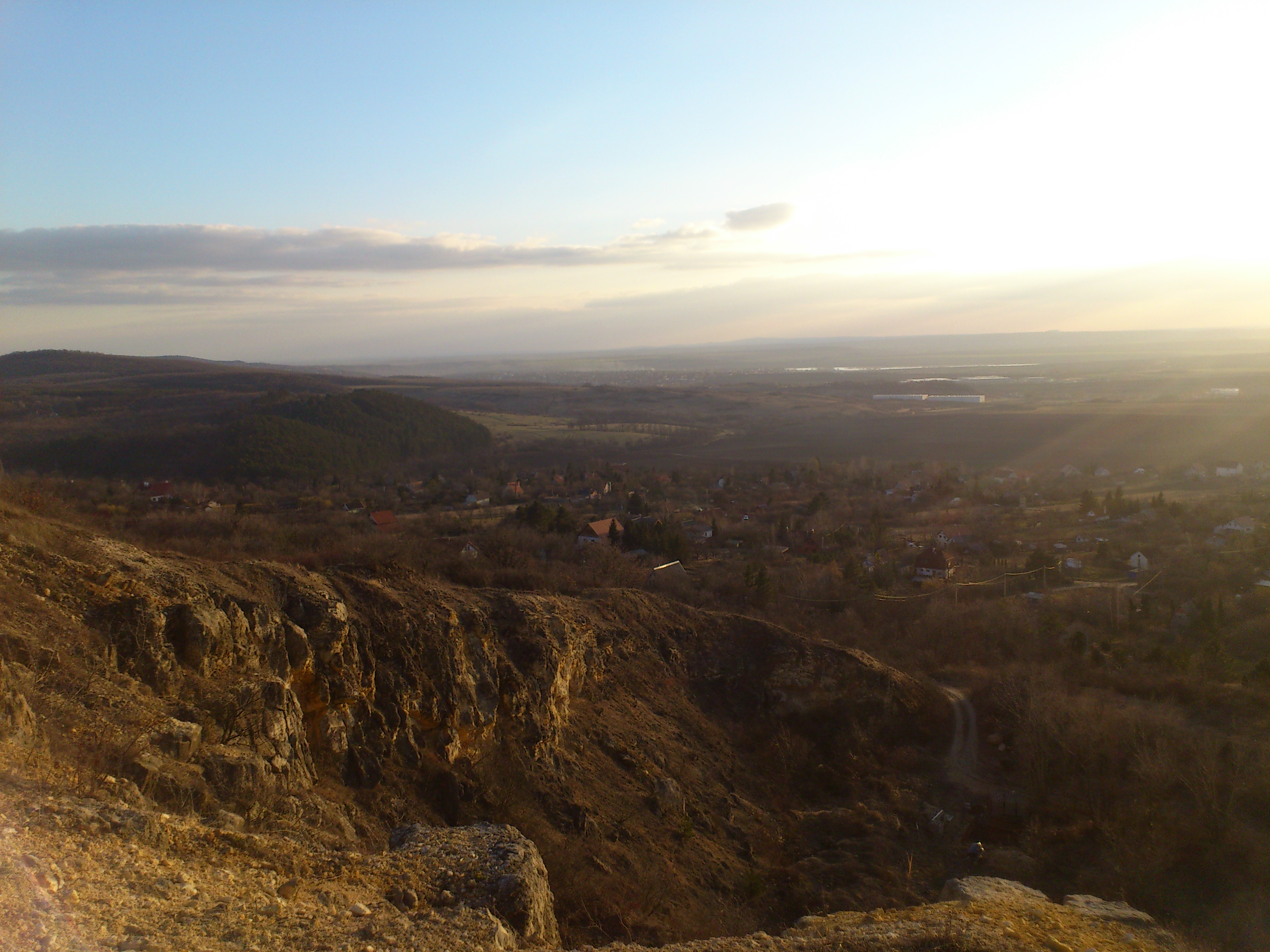
View from Mine Hilltop

- Várady-castle
- Reformed Church
- I. and II. World War Monument
- Catholic Church
- Winecellar Hill
- Rabec-curve – pine forest
- Turul-statue
- Mine Hilltop viewpoint
- Csergezán Pál-viewpoint

== Sister cities ==
- Almașu (Váralmás), Romania
- Gbelce (Köbölkút), Slovakia
- Kirchheim bei München, Germany
- Solarolo, Italy
- Selvino, Italy
- Úvaly, Czech Republic

== Képek ==
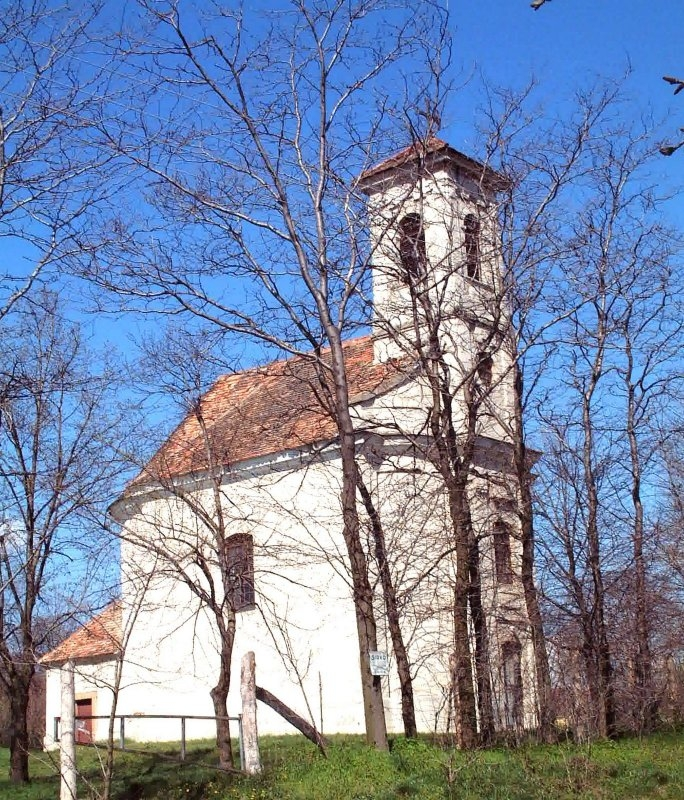
Catholic Church

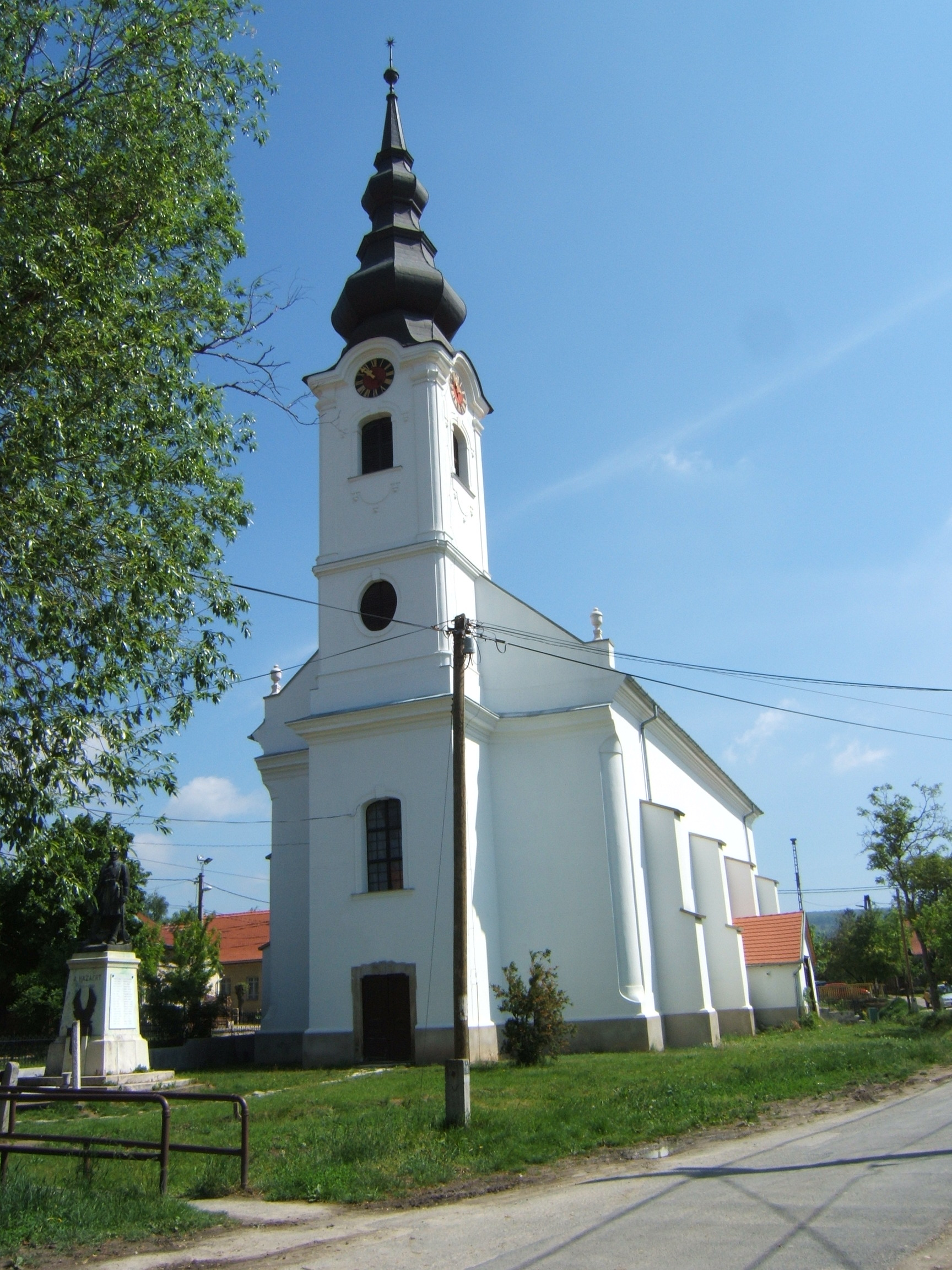
Reformed Church

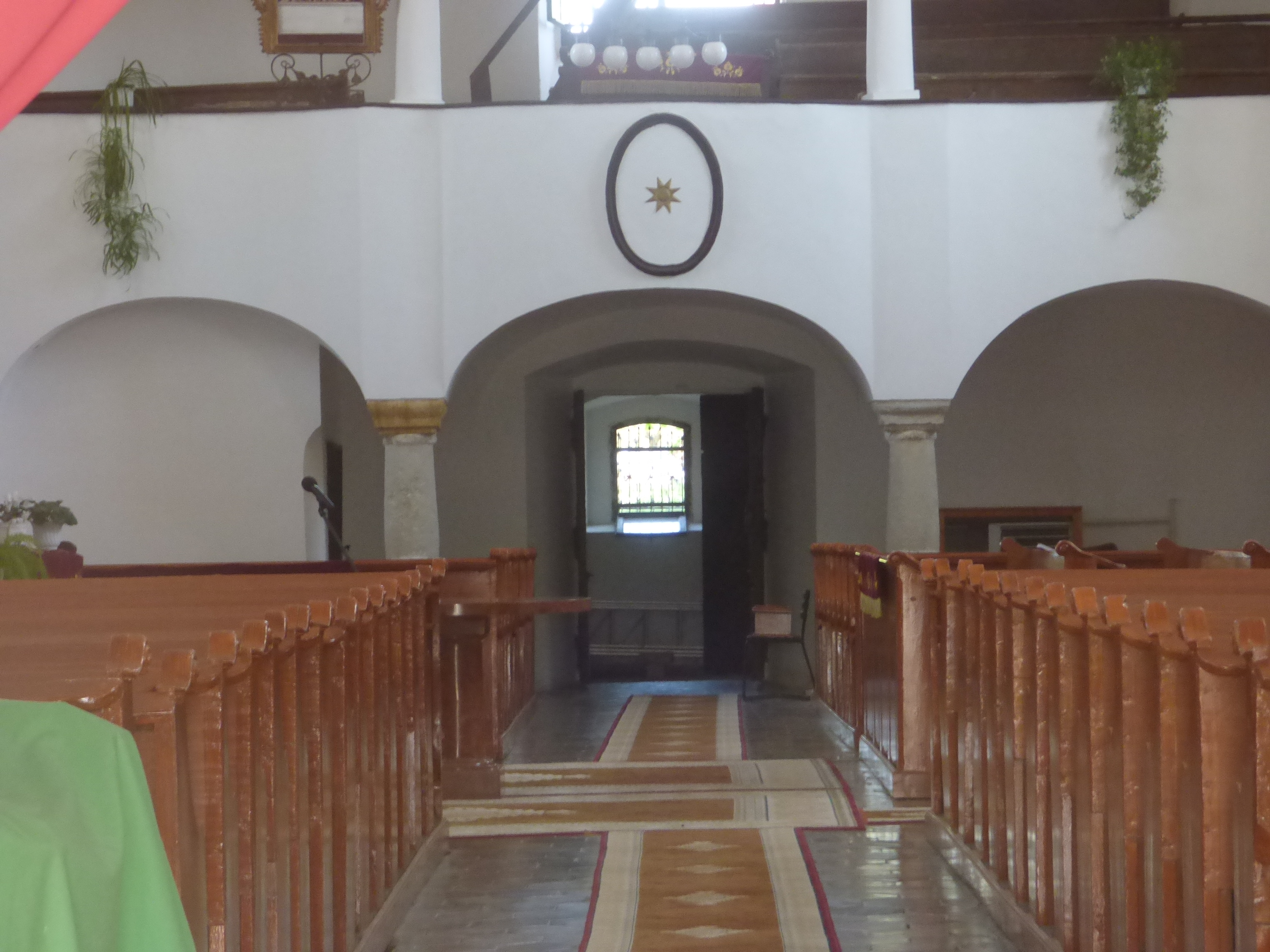
Reformed Church

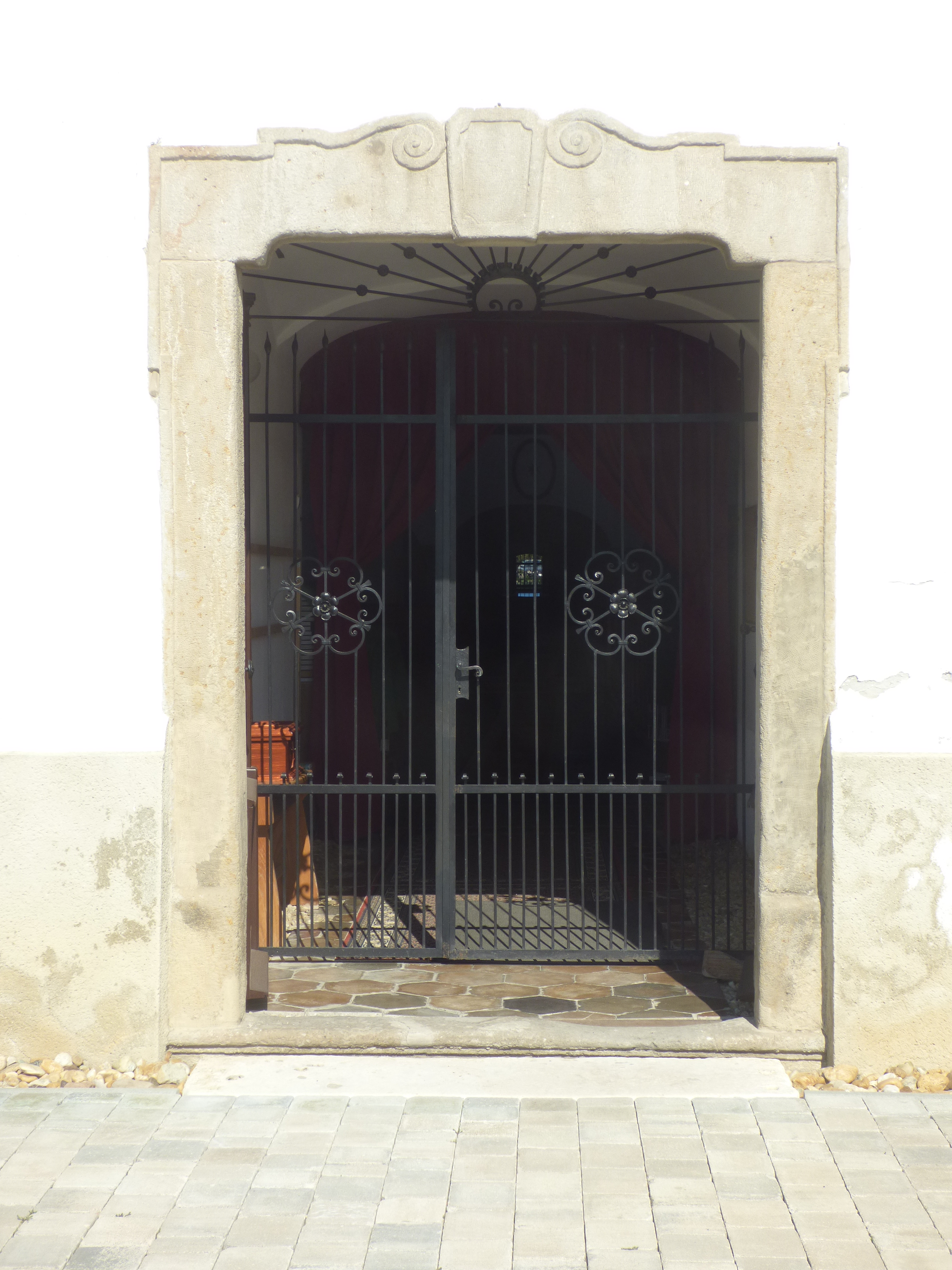
Reformed Church

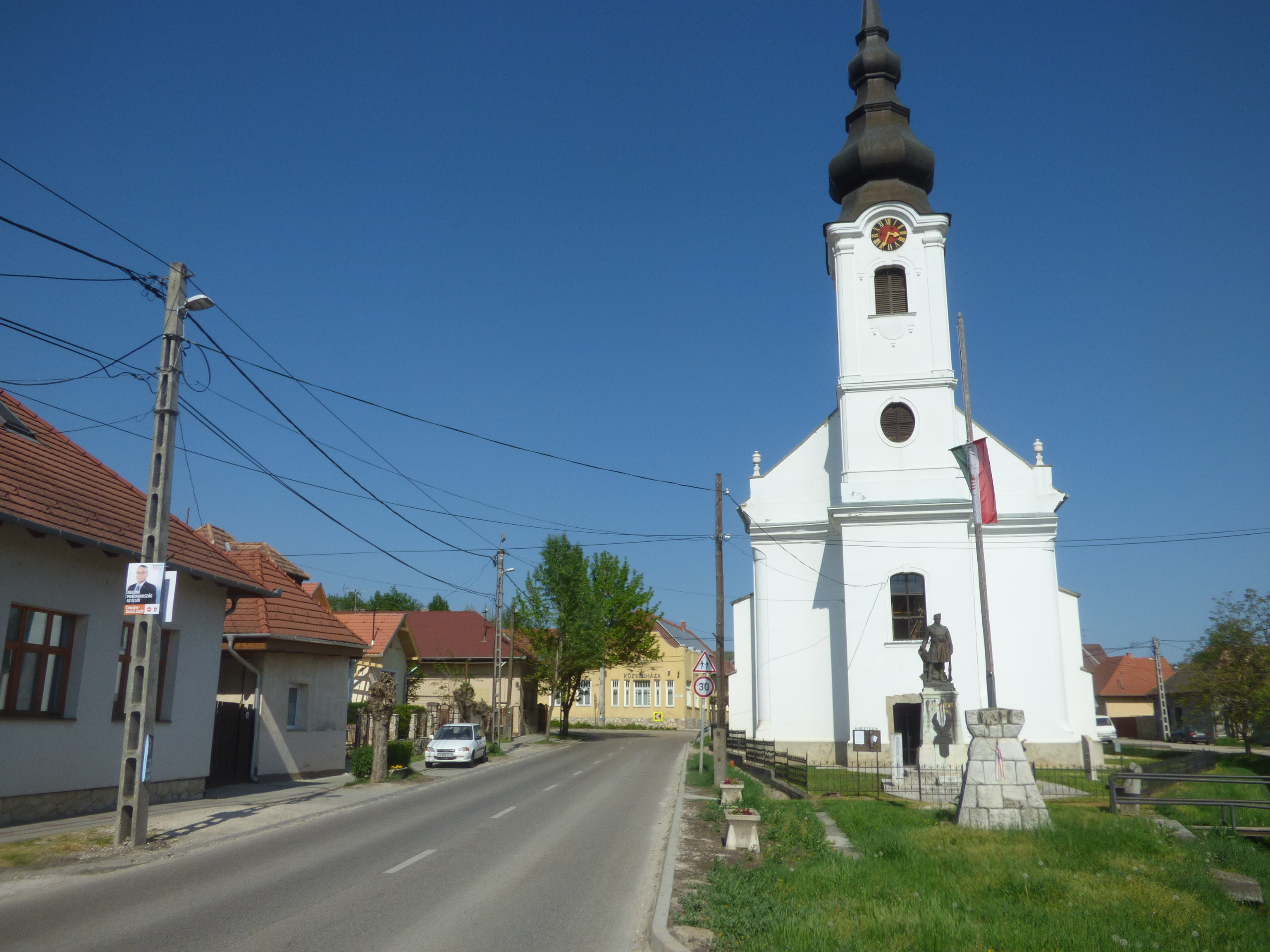
Reformed Church

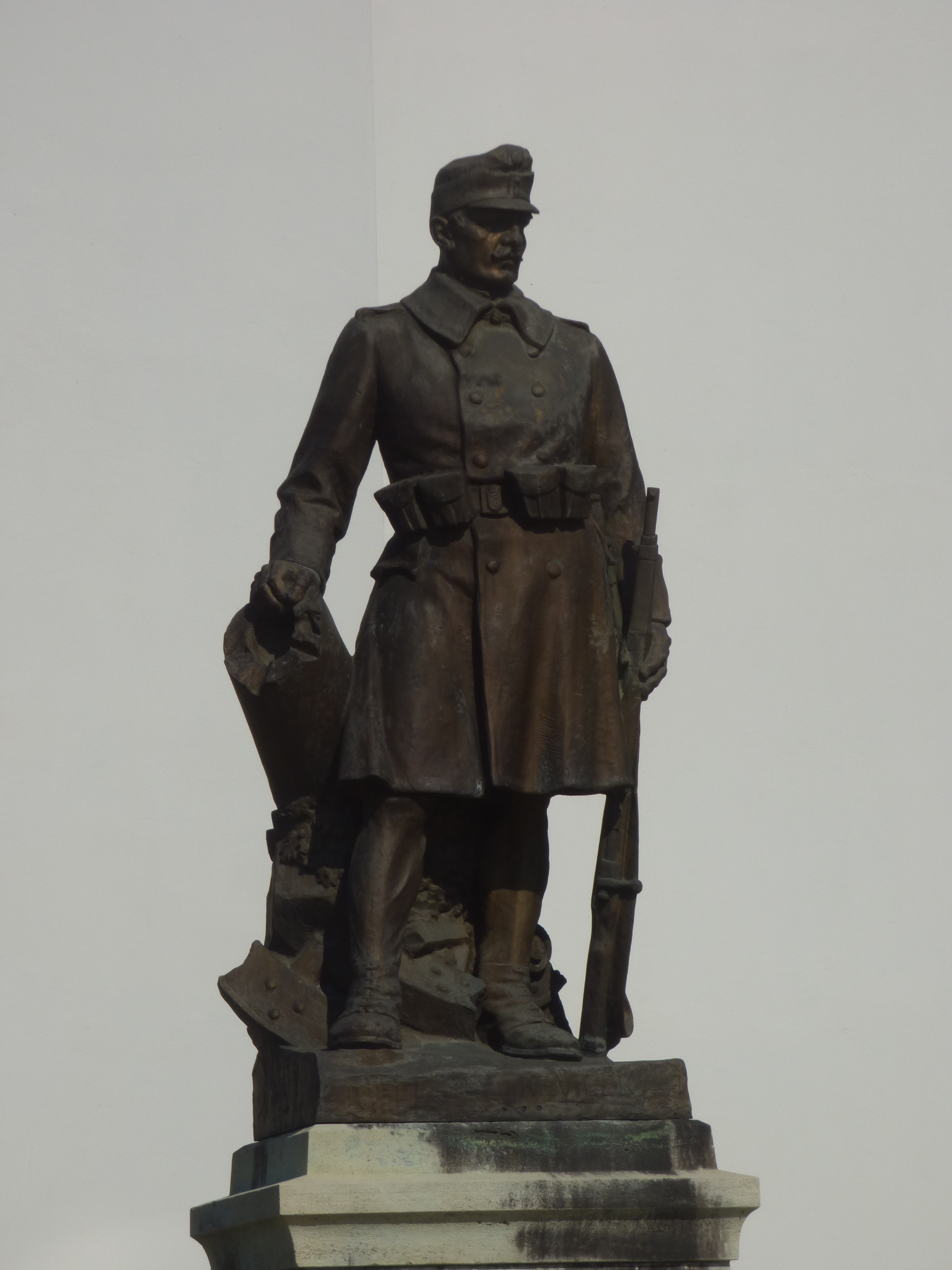
I. and II. World War Monument
