= Zsámbék =

Zsámbék Schambeck
- Town
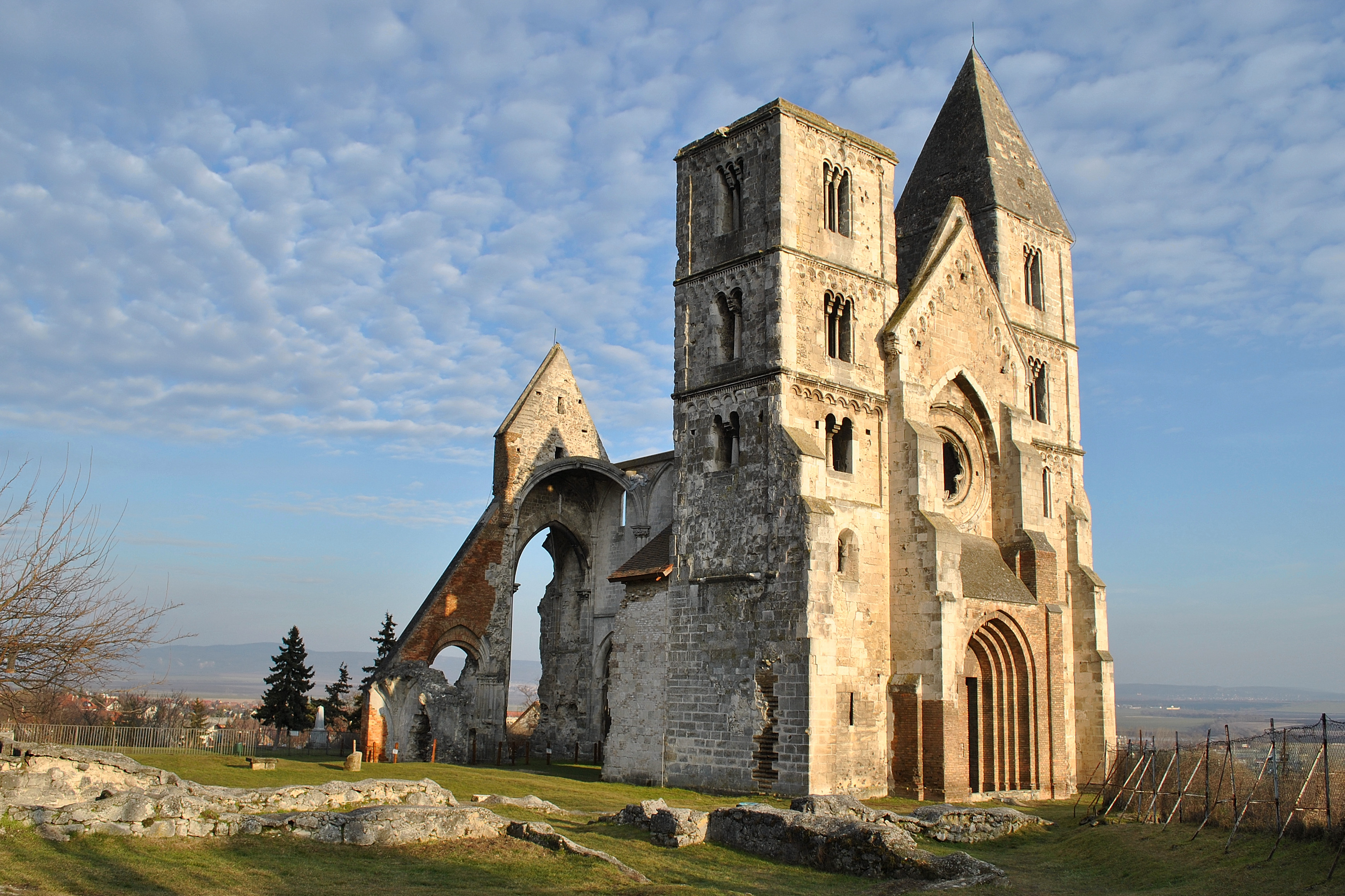
- Zsámbék Premontre monastery church

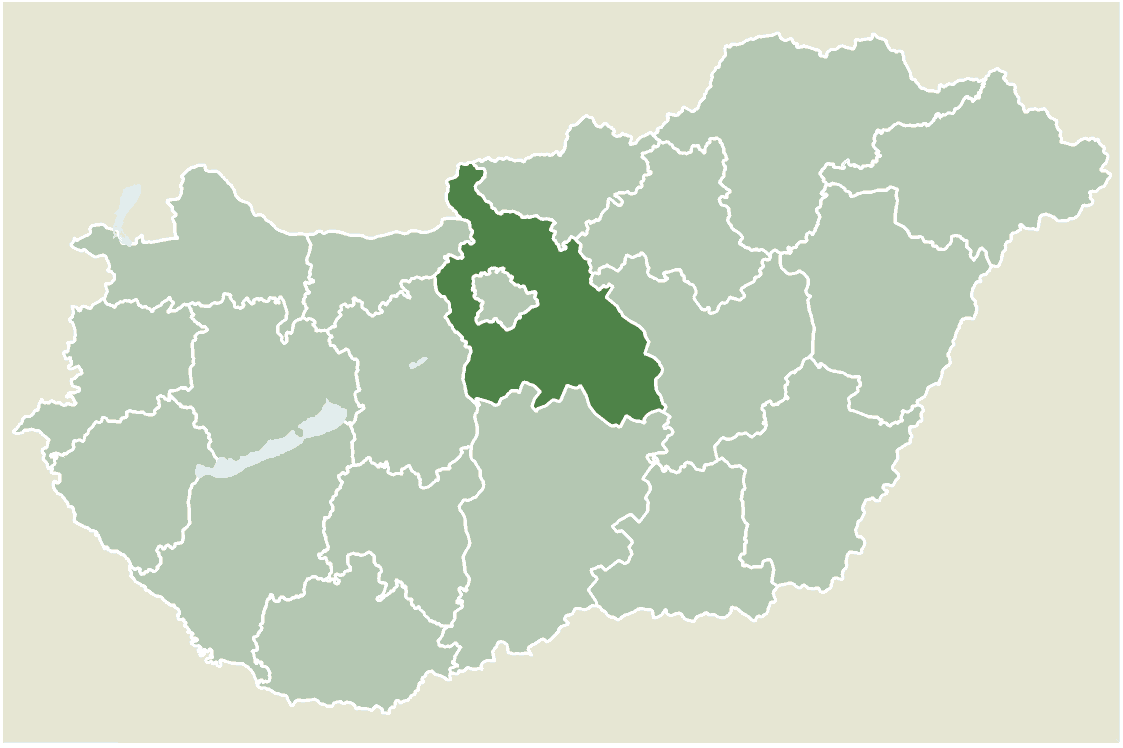
- Location of Pest County in Hungary

- Location of Zsámbék
- Coordinates: 47.548333°N 18.718611°E
- Country: Hungary
- County: Pest
- District: Budakeszi

Population (2017)
  - Total: 5,479
- Demonym: zsámbéki
- Time zone: UTC+1 (CET)
  - Summer (DST): UTC+2 (CEST)
- Postal code: 2072
- Area code: 23
- Motorways: M1
- Distance from Budapest: 28.9 km (18.0 mi) East

Zsámbék (German: Schambeck) is a town in Pest County, Hungary.

== Location ==
Zsámbék is located 30 km west of Budapest along the M1 motorway in the Gerecse Mountains. Its neighbouring villages are Tök, Perbál, Páty, Herceghalom, Mány, Bicske, and Szomor.

== History ==
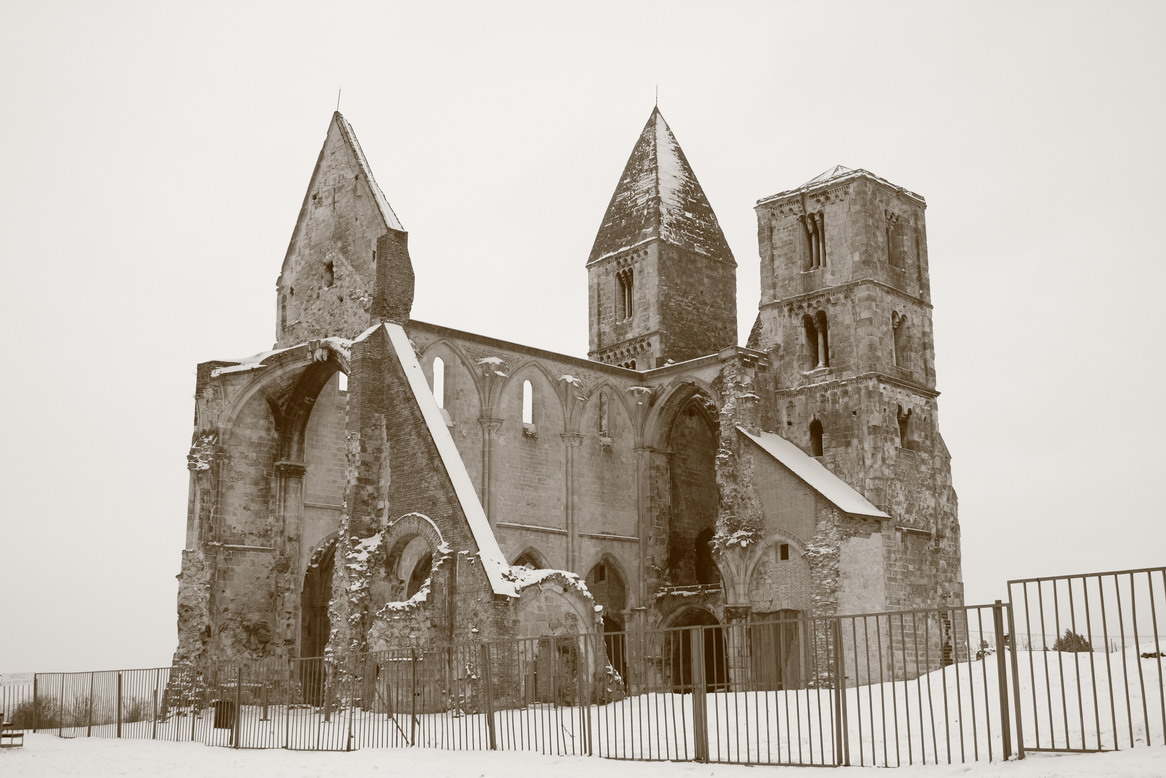
The ruins

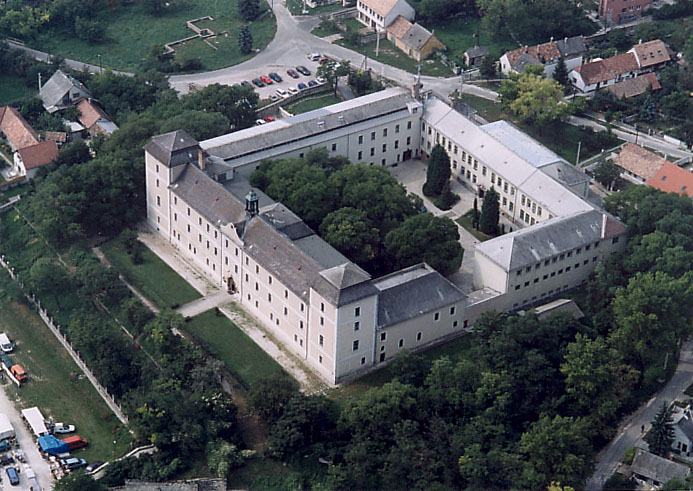
The castle

Zsámbék has been inhabited since Paleolithic times. It has seen Celtic, Roman and Avar populations throughout its history, according to archaeological finds. A Celtic coach's remains were found there as well as a bronze trumpet.

In the 1180s the wife of Béla III of Hungary, Margaret Capet, who was the step-sister of the French king Philippe Auguste, granted land around the village to a knight named Aynard, in recognition of his service to the King for safely escorting Margaret from Paris to Esztergom in 1186. His origin is obscure, but he would certainly have been selected for the military responsibility from those who the French king trusted. The only identifiable person in the king's entourage named Aynard was at one time the Viscount of Limoges, who had been outlawed by the Anglo-Norman court of Henry II in 1183. This person was assassinated in Paris in the year 1199. Aynard's family built the Premonstratensian church beginning in 1220.

The church was destroyed in 1241 during the Mongolian invasions. Following the destruction, during the reign of Béla IV of Hungary, the church and monastery were rebuilt. Positioned at an important merchant route — halfway between Esztergom and Székesfehérvár and near Buda — the village underwent rapid growth.

In 1467 Matthias Corvinus granted the rights of a borough. He also gave the fortress to his son, John Corvinus.

In 1541, Turkish troops occupied the fortress and held it for 145 years. During this occupation, they also built a hammam (bathhouse), the ruins of which are still visible in the village.

In 1686 general János Bottyán fought there against the Turks. Later the Zichy family became the landowners of the region. They then rebuilt the castle.

An earthquake in 1763 ruined the church once again. It was not reconstructed after this horrific event. Settlers from Germany, who came to live in the abandoned village after the Turkish occupation, took the stones from the church and used them for building houses and fences. Many of the church's stones are still present in the walls of older houses.

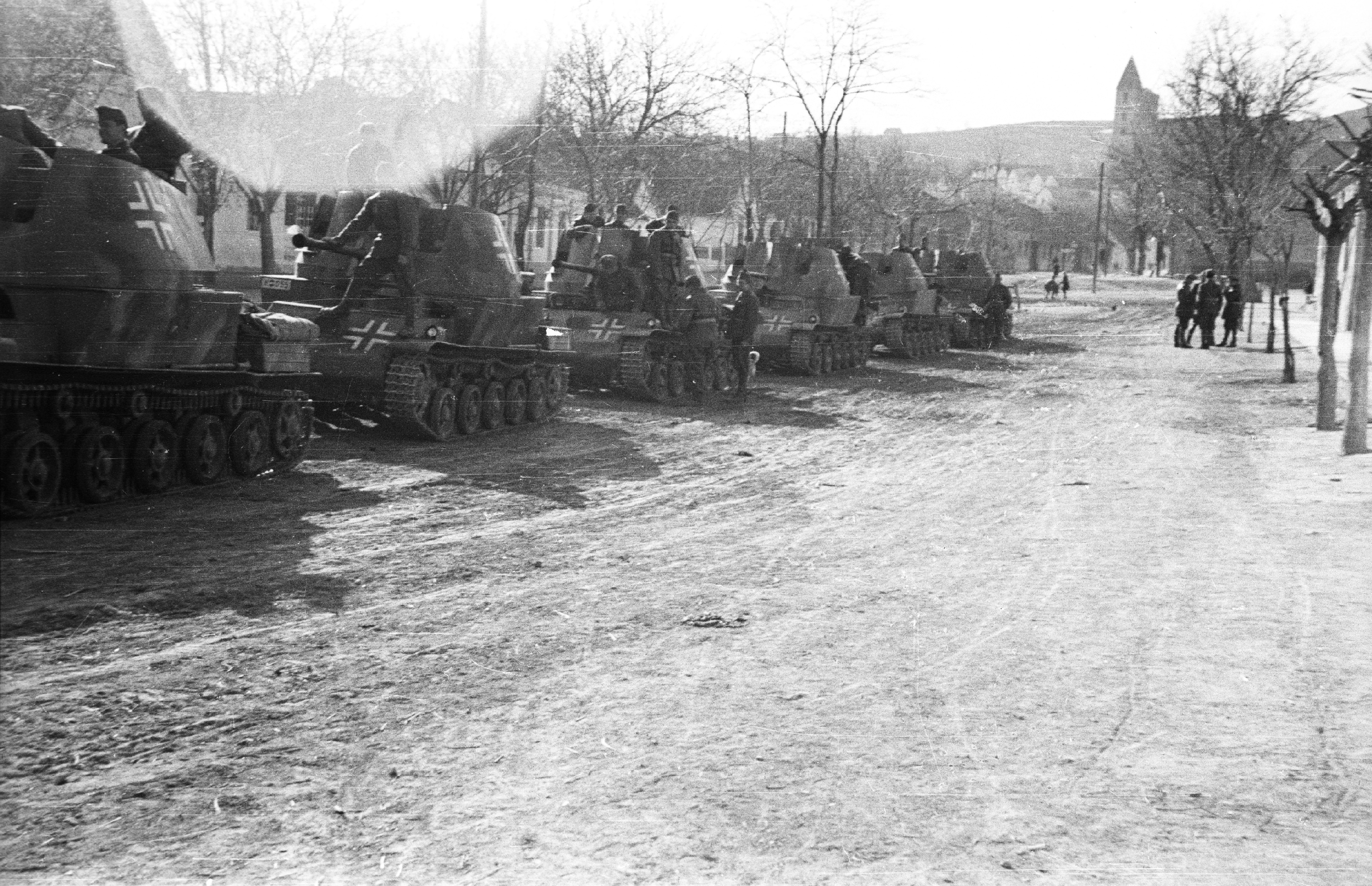
A coloumn of 40M Nimróds in Zsámbék in 1942. In the background is the Premonstratensian Monastery Church

Between the World Wars, the Royal Hungarian Army operated a training ground near the town.

In 1946, as part of the larger expulsion of Volksdeutsch from central Europe, 3,700 German inhabitants of Zsámbék—or approximately 95% of the town's population—were forcibly resettled to Germany. Ethnic Hungarian settlers from the Great Hungarian Plain repopulated the town.

== Notable people ==
- József Molnár, painter
- Joseph Gungl, Austrian composer

== Twin towns – sister cities ==
Zsámbék is twinned with:

- Mărtiniș, Romania
- Miglianico, Italy
- Wettenberg, Germany
- Zawiercie, Poland
