= Felsőpakony =

- Flag Coat of arms

- Location of Felsőpakony in Hungary
- Coordinates: 47°20′35.84″N 19°14′21.37″E
- Country: Hungary
- Region: Central Hungary
- County: Pest
- Subregion: Gyál
- Rank: Village

Area
  - Total: 15.36 km^{2} (5.93 sq mi)
- Time zone: UTC+1 (CET)
  - Summer (DST): UTC+2 (CEST)
- Postal code: 2363
- Area code: +36 29
- Website: www.felsopakony.hu

Felsőpakony is a village in Pest county, Budapest metropolitan area, Hungary. It has a population of 3,775 (2023).
