= Csörög =

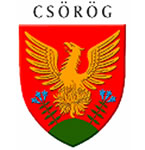
- Coat of arms

- Location of Csörög in Hungary
- Coordinates: 47.73141°N 19.20290°E
- Country: Hungary
- Region: Central Hungary
- County: Pest
- Subregion: Váci
- Rank: Village

Area
  - Total: 6.46 km^{2} (2.49 sq mi)

Population (1 January 2008)
  - Total: 2,116
  - Density: 328/km^{2} (848/sq mi)
- Time zone: UTC+1 (CET)
  - Summer (DST): UTC+2 (CEST)
- Postal code: 2135
- Area code: +36 27
- KSH code: 34333
- Website: www.csorog.hu

Csörög is a village in Pest county, Budapest metropolitan area, Hungary. It has a population of 2,056 (2007).
