= Joseph Gungl =

Hungarian composer, bandmaster, and conductor (1809–1889)

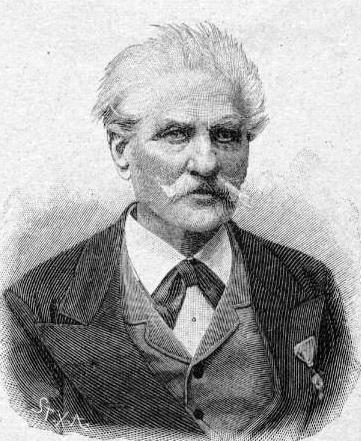
Joseph Gungl

Joseph Gungl, correct: Josef Gung'l (1 December 1809 – 1 February 1889), was a Hungarian composer, bandmaster, and conductor. He was soprano Virginia Naumann-Gungl's father.

== Biography ==
Gungl was born in Schambeck, Austrian-Hungarian monarchy (now Zsámbék, Hungary). After working as a school-teacher in Buda, and learning the elements of music from the school-choirmaster, he became first oboist at Graz, and, at twenty-five, bandmaster of the 4th Regiment of Austrian Artillery. His first composition, a Hungarian march, written in 1836, attracted some notice, and in 1843 he was able to establish an orchestra in Berlin. With this band he travelled far, even to the United States in 1848–1849. Mendelssohn's complete A Midsummer Night's Dream music is said to have been first played by Gungl's orchestra. In 1853 he became bandmaster to the 23rd Infantry Regiment at Brno, but in 1864 he moved to Munich, and in 1876 at Frankfurt, after having conducted with great success a series of promenade concerts at the Covent Garden in London in 1873. From Frankfurt, Gungl went to Weimar to live with his daughter, a well-known German opera singer, and died there.

== Compositions ==
Gungl was a very prolific composer, and in his lifetime composed no less than 436 dances, the most popular of which being the waltzes Amoretten, Hydropaten, Casino and Dreams on the Ocean, the In Stiller Mitternacht polka, and the Blue Violets mazurka. His Hungarian march was transcribed by Franz Liszt. His music is characterized by the same-easy flowing melodies and well-marked rhythm that distinguish the dances of the younger Strauss, to whom alone he can be ranked second in this kind of composition.
