= Virginia Naumann-Gungl =

American opera singer

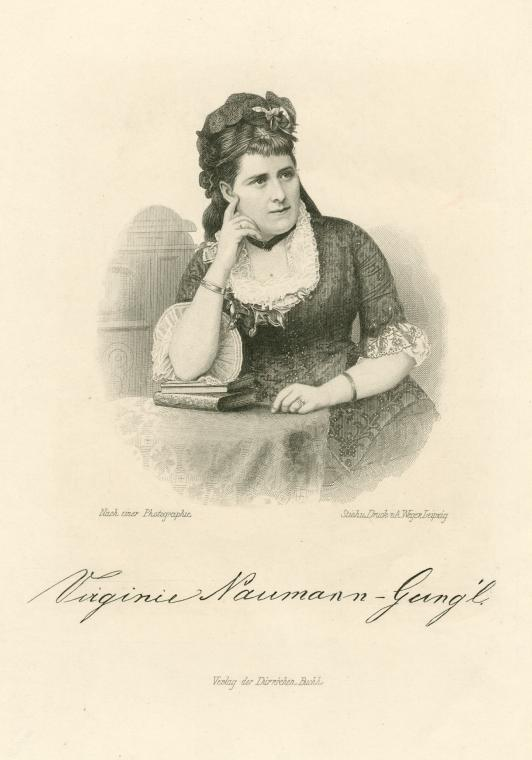
Virginia Naumann-Gungl

Virginia Gungl (31 December 1848 – 28 August 1915) was a German soprano of Hungarian origin, prima donna on the stages in Munich and Frankfurt. Her voice spanned more than two octaves.

== Career ==
Daughter of the composer and conductor Joseph Gungl, she was born in New York where her father was on tour. She studied with the conductor and composer Hans von Bülow in Munich. In 1869, she made her debut at the Bayerische Staatsoper, then moved to Vienna for two more years of musical study.

She was then hired in Berlin in 1872 where her first role was in The Magic Flute then at the Cologne Opera (1872-1874), the Mecklenburg State Theatre (1874-1875) the Opern- und Schauspielhaus Frankfurt (1875-1880). She sang at the Theater Bremen (1880-1882), the Royal Theater Kassel (1883-1885) where she worked with Gustav Mahler from 1883 to 1885 and the Deutsches Nationaltheater Weimar (1885-1891). There, she bade farewell to the stage in 1892 as Isolde in Tristan und Isolde.

During her career she sang at the Bavarian Royal Opera in Munich (1875), the Leipzig Municipal Theater (1889), the Royal Theater in Karlsruhe (1873) and the Municipal Theater in Hannover (1877).

From Frankfurt, she moved to Weimar, where she later became singing teacher at the Hochschule für Musik Franz Liszt, Weimar.

Naumann-Gungl died in Frankfurt on 28 August 1915 at age 66.

== Repertoire ==
- Léonore in Fidelio
- Reiza in Oberon
- Donna Anna in Don Giovanni
- Rachel in La Juive
- Countess Almaviva in The Marriage of Figaro
- Pamina in The Magic Flute
- Aida
- Carmen
- Isolde in Tristan und Isolde
- Sélika in L'Africaine
- Senta in Der Fliegende Holländer.

== Bibliography ==
- Gran Enciclopèdia de la Música Clàsica, vol. II, Sarpe, 558 p. (ISBN 84-7291-226-4)
- K. J. Kutsch and Leo Riemens, Großes Sängerlexikon, Vol 4, Munich, 1999.
- (in German) L.Fränkel, Virginia Naumann-Gungl, 1915.
