= Sankt Margarethen an der Raab =

St. Margarethen an der Raab
- Municipality
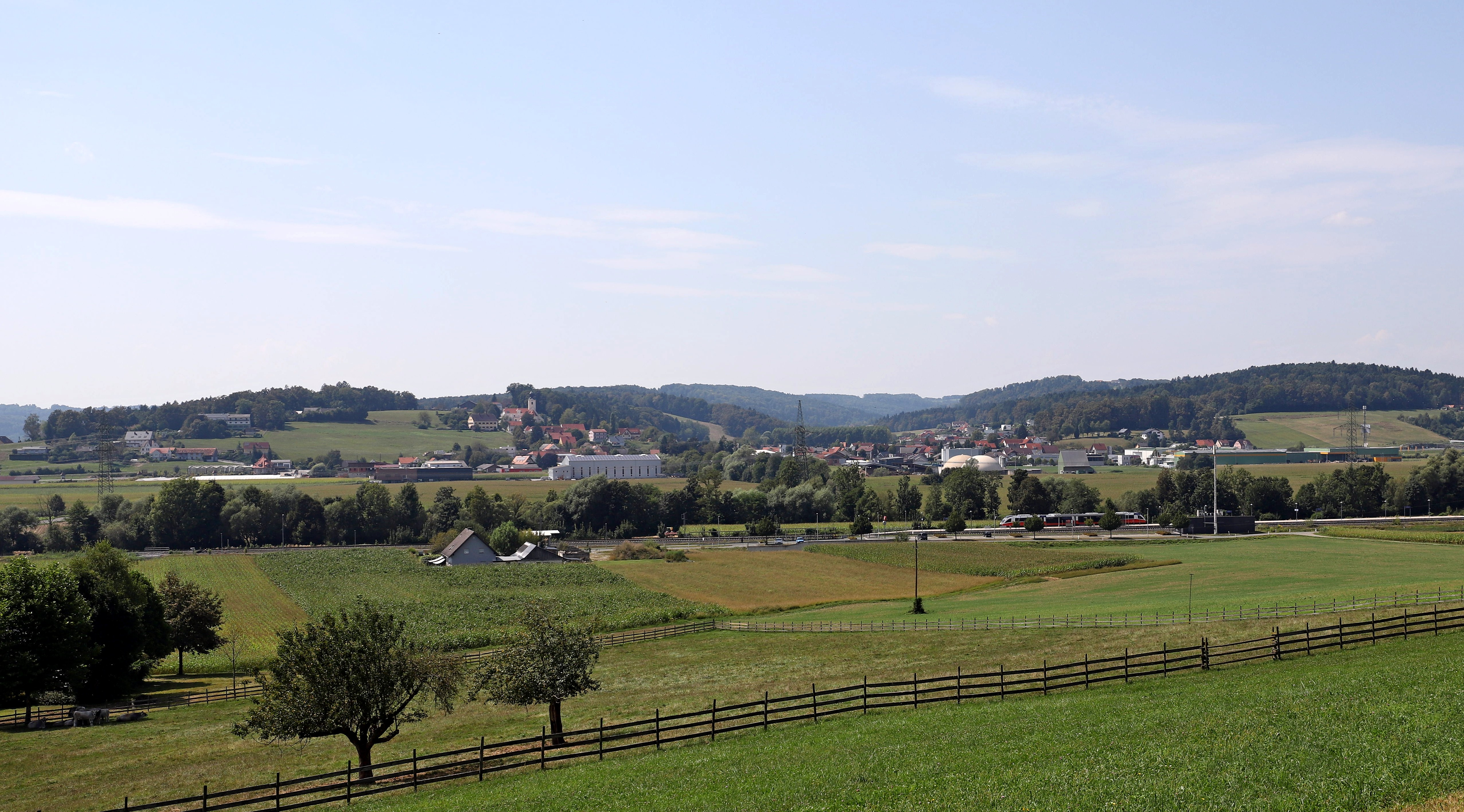
- Saint Margaret / Raab

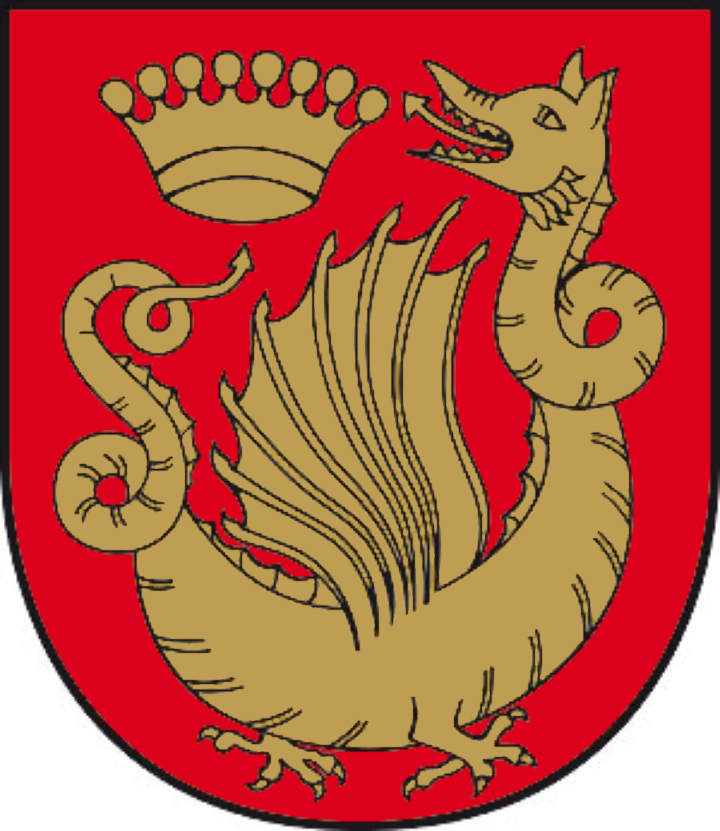
- Coat of arms

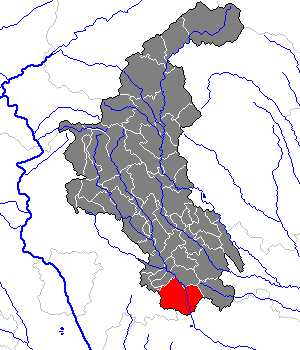
- Location within Weiz district

- Location within Austria
- Coordinates: 47°03′00″N 15°45′00″E
- Country: Austria
- State: Styria
- District: Weiz

Government
  - Mayor: Herbert Mießl (ÖVP)

Area
  - Total: 43.11 km^{2} (16.64 sq mi)
- Elevation: 380 m (1,250 ft)

Population (2018-01-01)
  - Total: 4,074
  - Density: 94.50/km^{2} (244.8/sq mi)
- Time zone: UTC+1 (CET)
  - Summer (DST): UTC+2 (CEST)
- Postal code: 8321
- Area code: 03115
- Vehicle registration: WZ
- Website: www.st-margarethen-raab.at

Sankt Margarethen an der Raab is a municipality in the district of Weiz in the Austrian state of Styria.

== Geography ==
The municipality lies in the Raab valley.
