= Budakeszi =

- Town
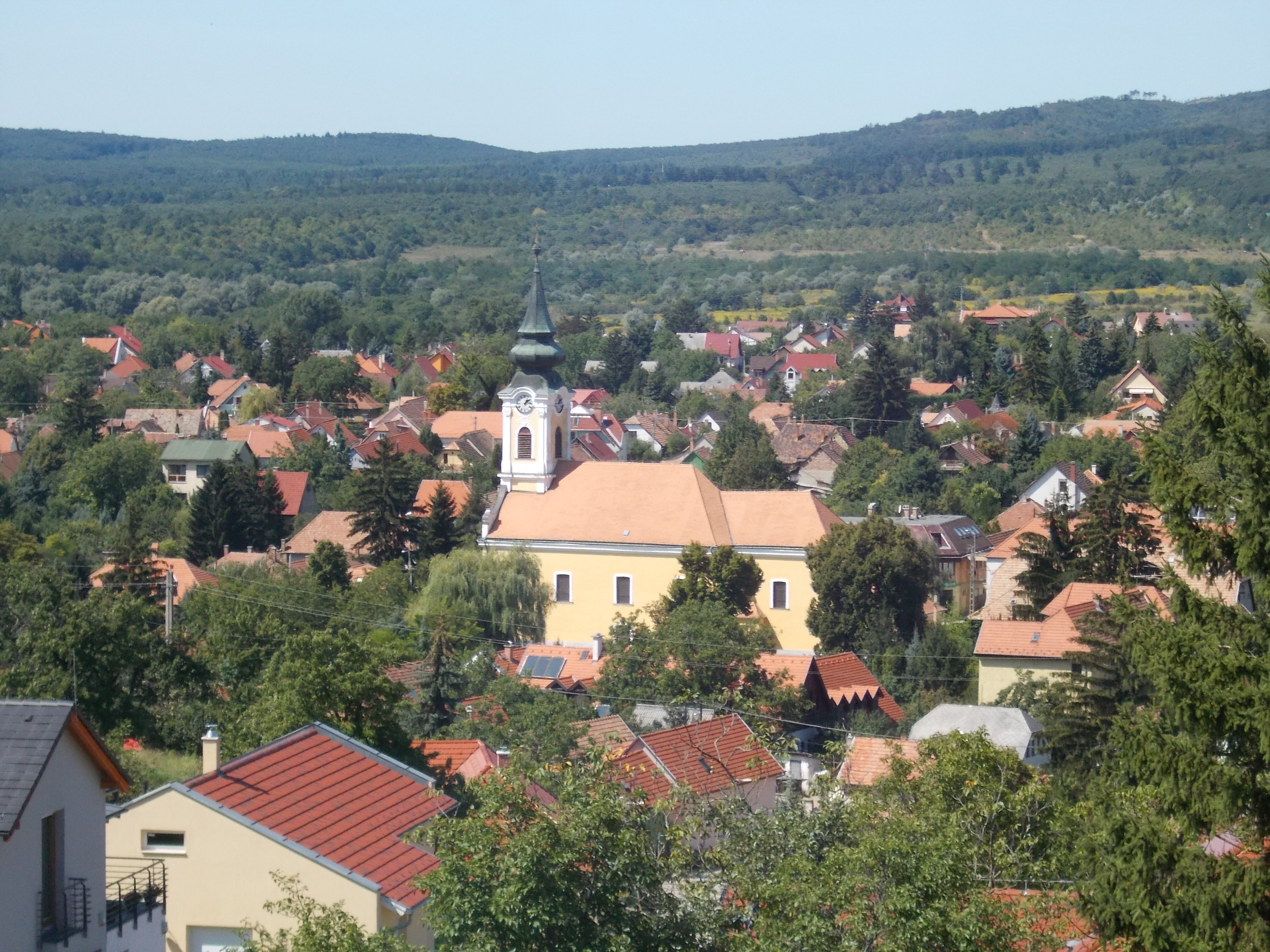
- Aerial view

- Flag Coat of arms

- Location of Budakeszi
- Coordinates: 47.51227°N 18.92806°E
- Country: Hungary
- County: Pest
- District: Budakeszi
- First mentioned: 1270

Area
  - Total: 37.11 km^{2} (14.33 sq mi)

Population (2025)
  - Total: 15,950
  - Density: 386.15/km^{2} (1,000.1/sq mi)
- Time zone: UTC+1 (CET)
  - Summer (DST): UTC+2 (CEST)
- Postal code: 2092
- Area code: (+36) 23
- Website: www.budakeszi.hu

Budakeszi (German: Wudigess or Wudigeß) is a town in Pest County, in the Budapest metropolitan area, Hungary. It is located beyond the János Hill at the western city limits of Budapest, about 12 km (7 mi) west of the Zero Kilometre Stone in the city centre. A popular recreational area, the landscape is characterized by forests, predominantly oaks, by vineyards and by orchards.

== Meaning of the name ==
Buda is the western side of Budapest, Keszi was one of the seven ancient Hungarian tribes.

== History ==
The settlement in the Kingdom of Hungary was first mentioned about 1270, it was completely devastated during the Ottoman Siege of Buda in 1541. In the aftermath of the Ottoman defeat at the 1683 Battle of Vienna, the depopulated area was re-settled with "Danube Swabian" (most of them actually descending from Lorraine, the Palatinate and Alsace) immigrants by the order of the Habsburg King Leopold I. Budakeszi was for centuries a predominantly "Schwabian" (ethnic German) village.

After World War II Budakeszi's history was influenced by the deportation of its ethnic German population according to Article 12 of the 1945 Potsdam Agreement. Though the expulsion was ordered under pressure of the Soviet forces, many Hungarians relished in the humiliation of ethnic Germans throughout the region and collectively took part in organized, forced deportations of German-speaking citizens to Germany. Most of these expellees had never been to Germany before, as even their great-grand parents had been born in Hungary. Budakeszi lost a great number of its citizens due to the above and the vacuum was later filled with the settlement of families from other regions, such as Transylvania.

== Budakeszi today ==
Many inhabitants commute to work to the capital Budapest daily. With mass transportation (No. 22 bus or Volánbusz intercity bus) this normally takes about 15 minutes.

Budakeszi has a historic main street and a baroque Roman Catholic church in its valley. There is also a Protestant church, the cemetery of which has largely German-named headstones, some of which date back to the early 19th century. (There are also about a dozen WW2 Polish soldiers buried in the cemetery).

Today Budakeszi's population is mixed; Hungarians, Schwabian-Germans, and Transylvanians share this small town. Near Budakeszi there is an airfield for sailplanes (gliders) and for small planes, as well as a recently established World War 2 German military cemetery.

== Twin towns – sister cities ==
Budakeszi is twinned with:

- Balog nad Ipľom, Slovakia
- Biecz, Poland
- Delbrück, Germany
- Dyida, Ukraine
- Lich, Germany
- Miercurea Ciuc, Romania
- Neckarsulm, Germany
- Sankt Margarethen an der Raab, Austria

== Notable citizens ==
Among the ethnic Germans expelled from Budakeszi in 1946 were the parents of Joseph "Joschka" Fischer, born in 1948, German foreign minister from 1998 to 2005. Fischer today holds an honorary citizenship.

- András Balczó, Olympic gold medalist (Modern Pentathlon, 1972)
- AWS, metalcore band
- Gáspár Nagy, poet, Kossuth Prize winner
- Zsolt Vajda, Media artist
- Csaba Pléh, psychologist, linguist, Széchenyi Prize winner
