= Sződ =

- Flag Coat of arms

- Location of Sződ in Hungary
- Coordinates: 47°43′28.74″N 19°10′16.97″E
- Country: Hungary
- Region: Central Hungary
- County: Pest
- Subregion: Váci
- Rank: Village

Government
  - Mayor: Hertel László

Area
  - Total: 14.38 km^{2} (5.55 sq mi)
- Time zone: UTC+1 (CET)
  - Summer (DST): UTC+2 (CEST)
- Postal code: 2134
- Area code: +36 27
- Website: www.szod.hu

Sződ is a village in Pest county, Hungary. Nestled on the left bank of the Danube River, this village has its roots dating back to the 13th century. Sződ was first documented in 1274, showcasing its long-standing presence in the region. Historical structures include the 14th-century Roman Catholic Church and a town hall from the 19th century.
