= Remeteszőlős =

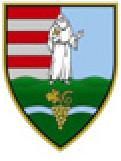
- Coat of arms

- Location of Remeteszőlős in Hungary
- Coordinates: 47°33′36.32″N 18°55′8.22″E
- Country: Hungary
- Region: Central Hungary
- County: Pest
- Subregion: Pilisvörösvári
- Rank: Village

Government
  - Mayor: Szathmáry Gergely

Area
  - Total: 0.56 km^{2} (0.22 sq mi)
- Time zone: UTC+1 (CET)
  - Summer (DST): UTC+2 (CEST)
- Postal code: 2090
- Area code: +36 26
- Website: www.remeteszolos.hu

Remeteszőlős is a village in Pest county, Hungary.
