= Herceghalom =

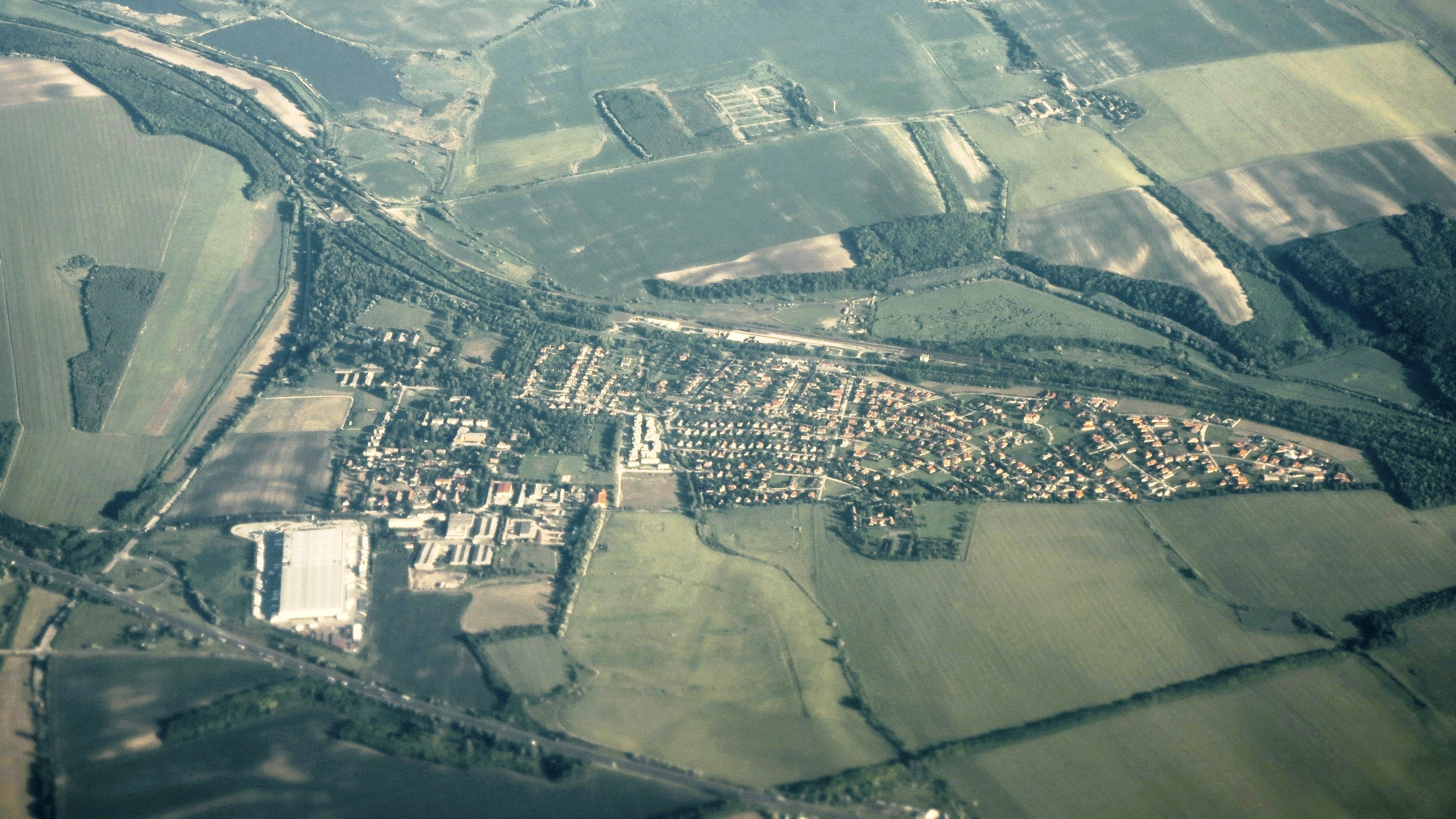
- Aerial view

- Flag Coat of arms

- Location within Hungary
- Coordinates: 47.49709°N 18.74519°E
- Country: Hungary
- Region: Central Hungary
- County: Pest
- District: Budakeszi
- Rank: Village

Area
  - Total: 7.38 km^{2} (2.85 sq mi)

Population (2017)
  - Total: 2,599
- Postal code: 2053
- Area code: 23
- Motorways: M1
- Distance from Budapest: 28.7 km (17.8 mi) East
- Website: https://www.herceghalom.hu/

Herceghalom is a village in Pest county, Budapest metropolitan area, Hungary. It has a population of 3,511 (2007).
