= Budajenő =

Budajenő _{Jeine}
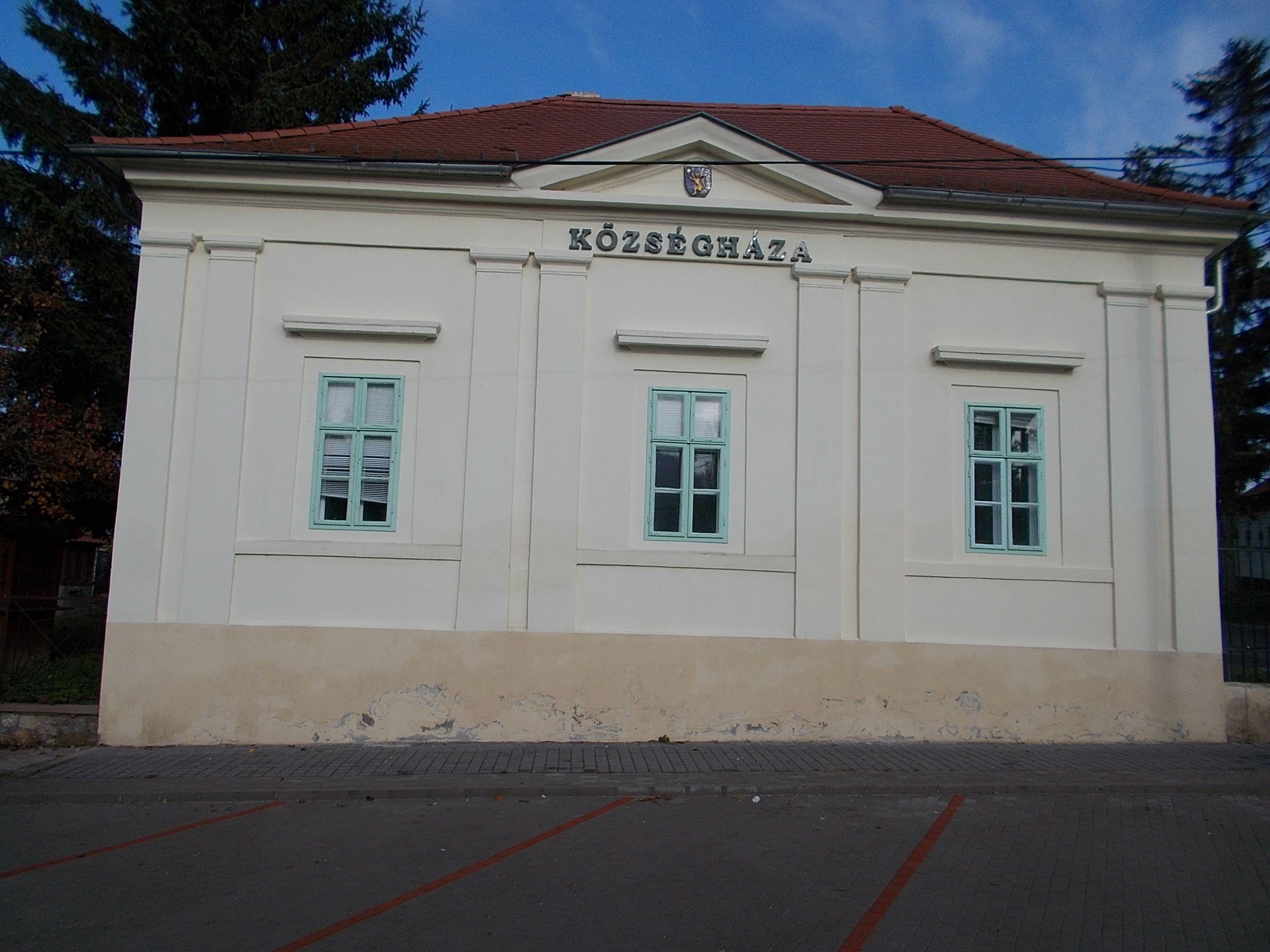
- Village hall

- Location of Budajenő _{Jeine} in Hungary
- Coordinates: 47°33′22.57″N 18°48′9.61″E
- Country: Hungary
- Region: Central Hungary
- County: Pest
- Subregion: Budaörsi
- Rank: Village

Area
  - Total: 12.42 km^{2} (4.80 sq mi)
- Time zone: UTC+1 (CET)
  - Summer (DST): UTC+2 (CEST)
- Postal code: 2093
- Area code: +36 26
- Website: www.budajeno.hu

Budajenő (German: Jeine) is a village in Pest county, Budapest metropolitan area, Hungary. It has a population of 1,617 (2007).

The settlement has a strong appeal with its pristine buildings and also architecturally significant buildings. The most important buildings are the former monastery from the 19th century in neoclassical style, school today, Calvary Chapel and the cemetery from the 12th century, winegrowers' houses from the 17th century in the folk style.

== See also ==
- Lion and Sun#Other (non-Iranian) variants
