= Telki =

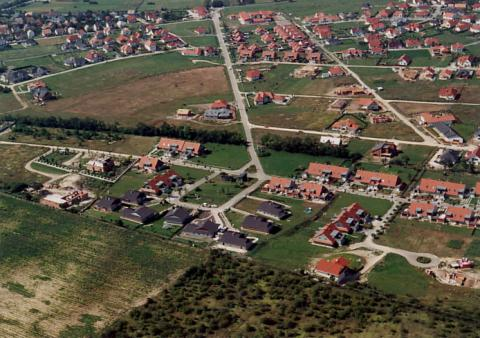
- Aerial view

- Flag Coat of arms

- Location within Hungary
- Coordinates: 47°33′N 18°50′E
- Country: Hungary
- County: Pest

Area
  - Total: 10.47 km^{2} (4.04 sq mi)

Population (2007)
  - Total: 3,113
  - Density: 297/km^{2} (770/sq mi)
- Time zone: UTC+1 (CET)
  - Summer (DST): UTC+2 (CEST)
- Postal code: 2089
- Area code: 26
- Website: https://www.telki.hu/

Telki is a village in Pest County, Hungary, located near Budakeszi and some 10 km (6 mi), away from Budapest.

== Twin towns ==
- Caramanico Terme, Italy
- Löwenstein, Germany
- (Czech Republic) Sloupno, Czechia
