= Tök =

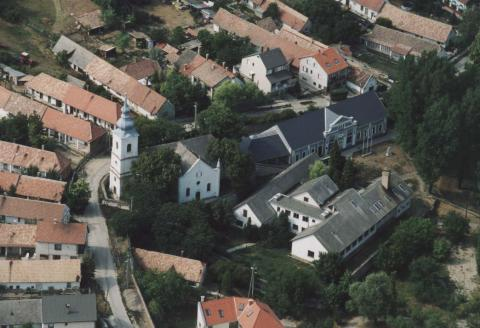

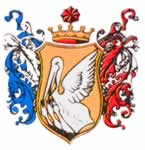
- Coat of arms

- Location of Tök in Hungary
- Coordinates: 47°34′0.01″N 18°43′59.99″E
- Country: Hungary
- Region: Central Hungary
- County: Pest
- Subregion: Pilisvörösvári
- Rank: Village

Area
  - Total: 24.73 km^{2} (9.55 sq mi)

Population (1 January 2008)
  - Total: 1,398
  - Density: 56.53/km^{2} (146.4/sq mi)
- Time zone: UTC+1 (CET)
  - Summer (DST): UTC+2 (CEST)
- Postal code: 2073
- Area code: +36 23
- KSH code: 24527
- Website: www.tok.hu

Tök is a village in Pest county, Hungary. It is located 30 km from Budapest, on the edge of the Zsámbék basin.
