= Fót =

- Town
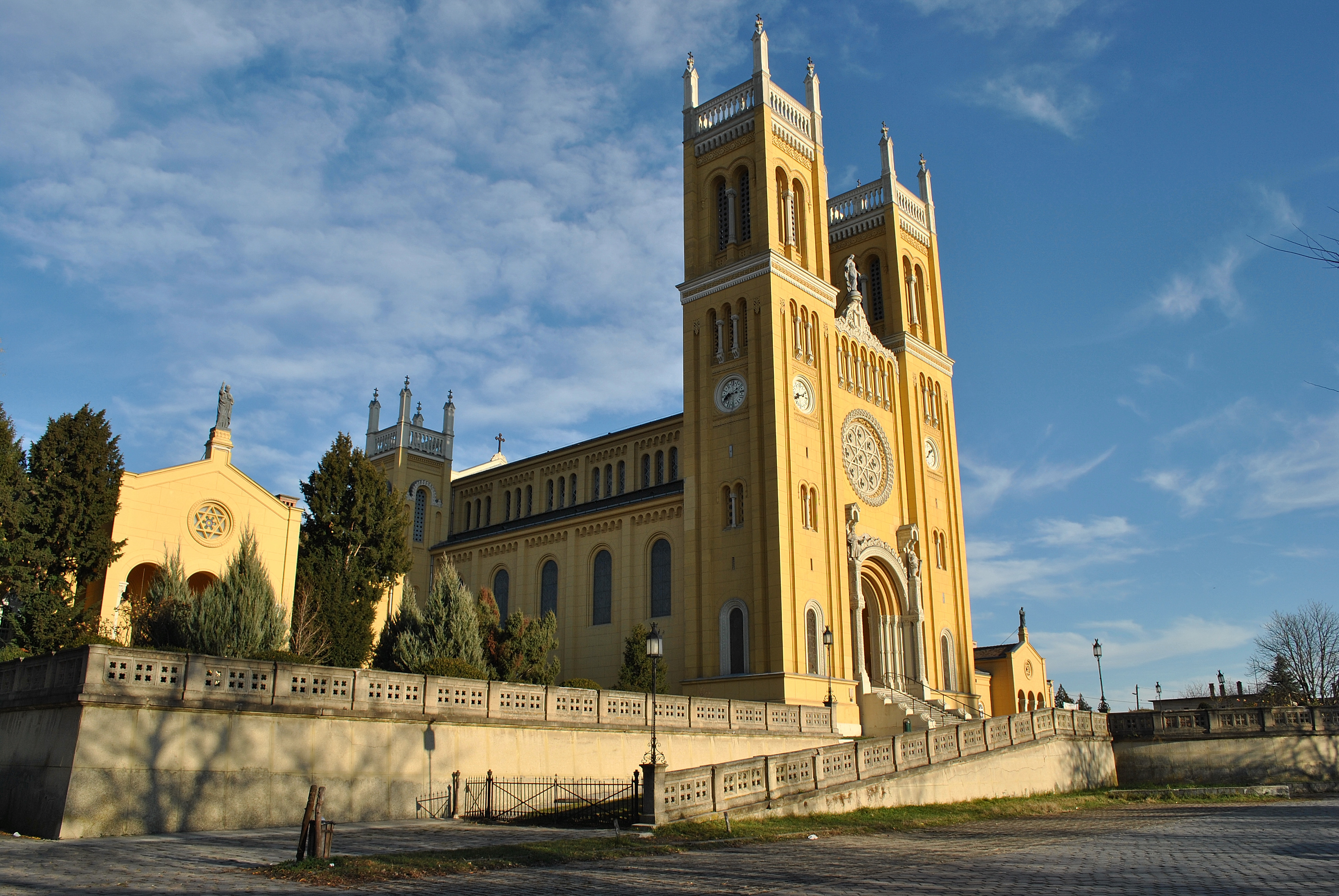
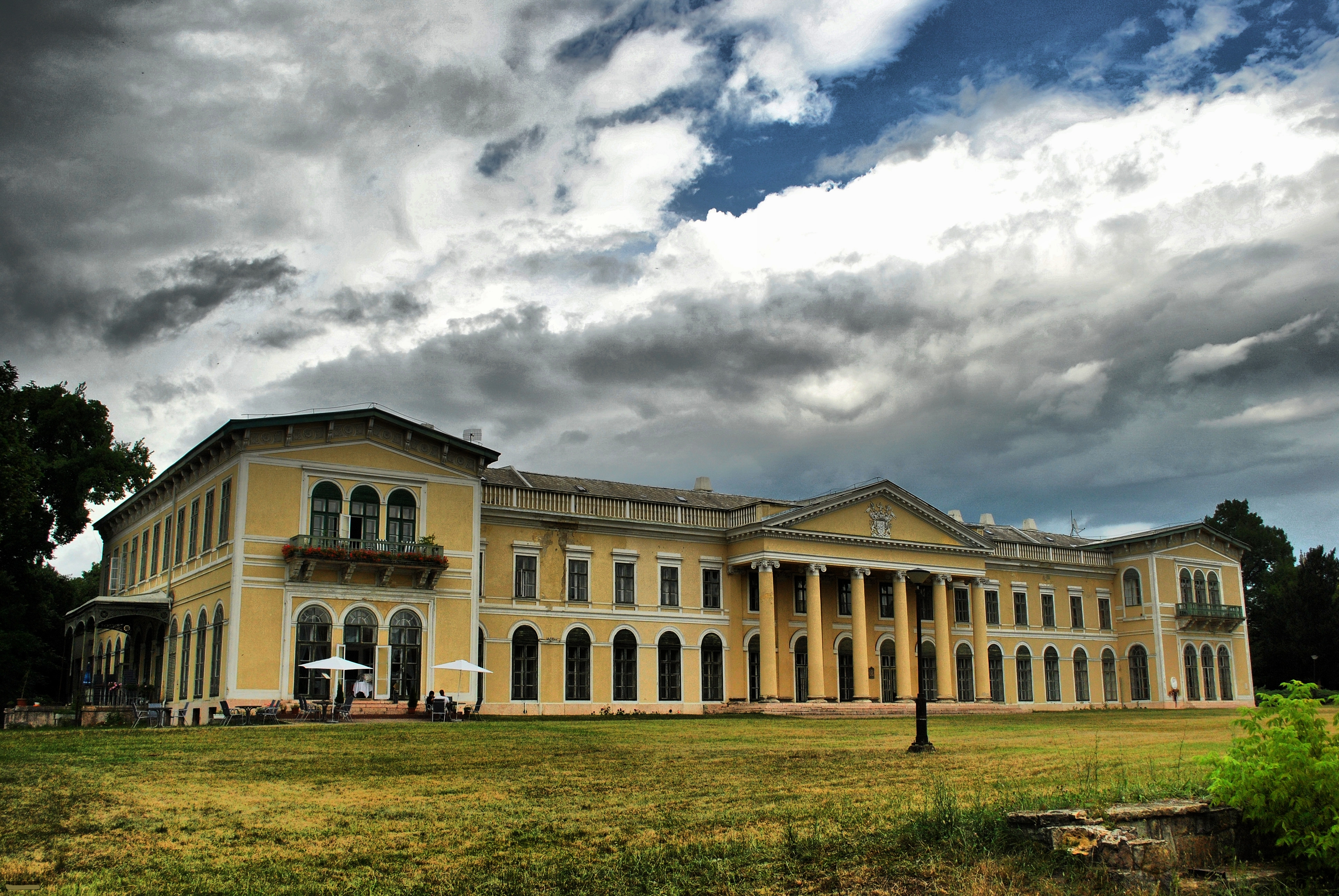
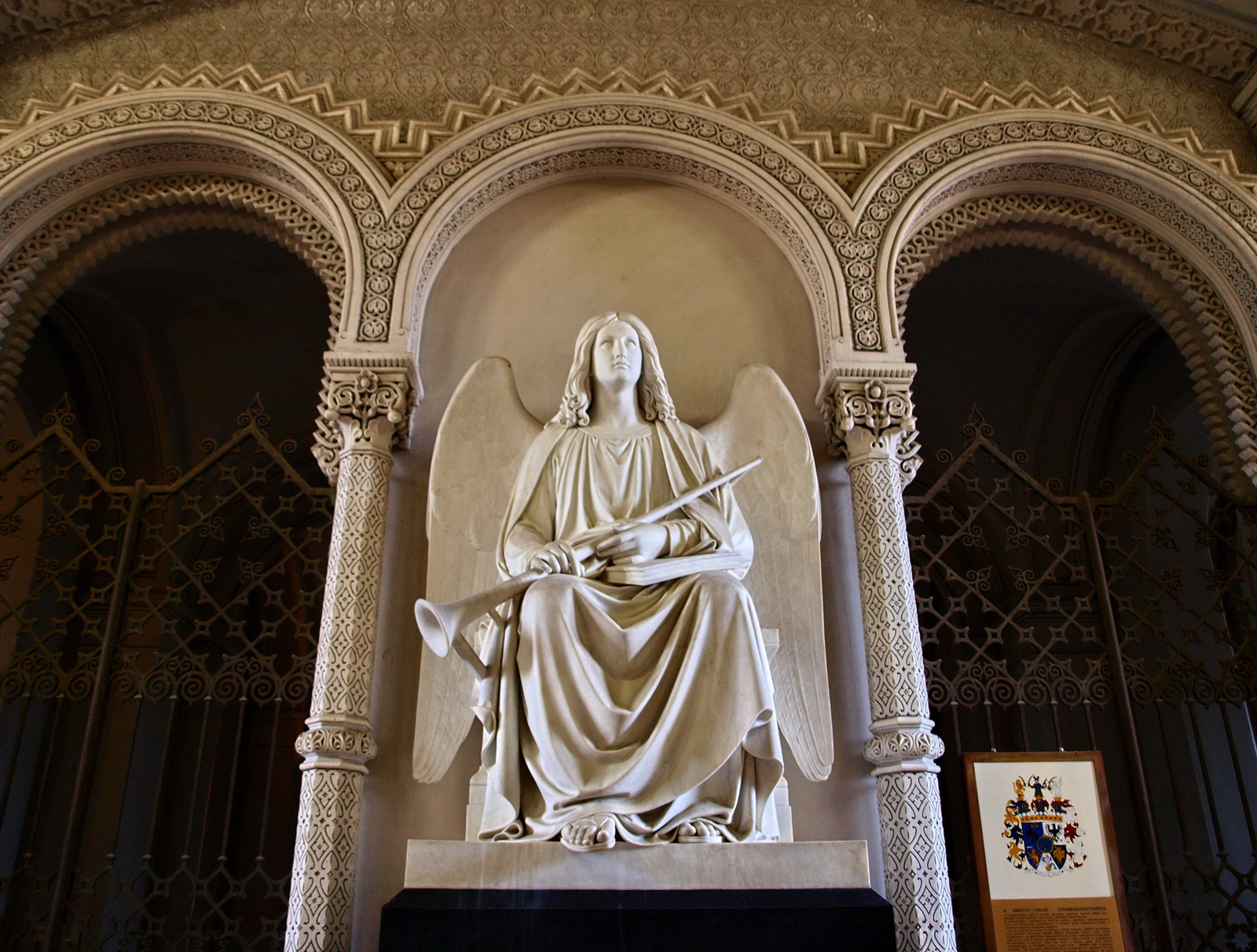

- Flag Coat of arms

- Location within Hungary
- Coordinates: 47.61812°N 19.19032°E
- Country: Hungary
- County: Pest
- District: Dunakeszi

Area
  - Total: 37.42 km^{2} (14.45 sq mi)
  - Density: 506.9/km^{2} (1,313/sq mi)
- Time zone: UTC+1 (CET)
  - Summer (DST): UTC+2 (CEST)
- Postal code: 2151
- Area code: (+36) 27
- Website: www.fot.hu

Fót is a town in Pest county, Budapest metropolitan area, Hungary.

== Location ==
Fót is about 17 kilometres (11 miles) north of the edge of Budapest. The North Hungarian foothills lie to the west. The nearest settlement to the west is Dunakeszi, to the northeast are Csomád and Veresegyház, to the east is Mogyoród and Budapest is to the south. The highest point of nearby Somlyó Hill reaches 287 metres (942 feet) above sea level.

== Architecture ==
The older areas of Fót feature the notable Catholic Szeplőtelen Fogantatás (Immaculate Conception) Church, built between 1845 and 1855, and the Károlyi Palace, both designed by architect Miklós Ybl.

== Notable people ==
- Gábor Agárdy (1922–2006), actor of Armenian descent
- József Cselényi (1899–1949), singer-songwriter
- Zsolt Erdei (born 1974), professional boxer
- András Fáy (1786–1864), politician and writer
- János Garay (1812–1853), poet, writer and journalist
- Ádám Madaras (born 1966), pentathlete
- András Stohl (born 1967), actor

== Twin towns – sister cities ==
Fót is twinned with:

- Bălăușeri, Romania
- Batiovo, Ukraine
- San Benedetto dei Marsi, Italy
