= Balog nad Ipľom =

Balog nad Ipľom Ipolybalog
- Municipality
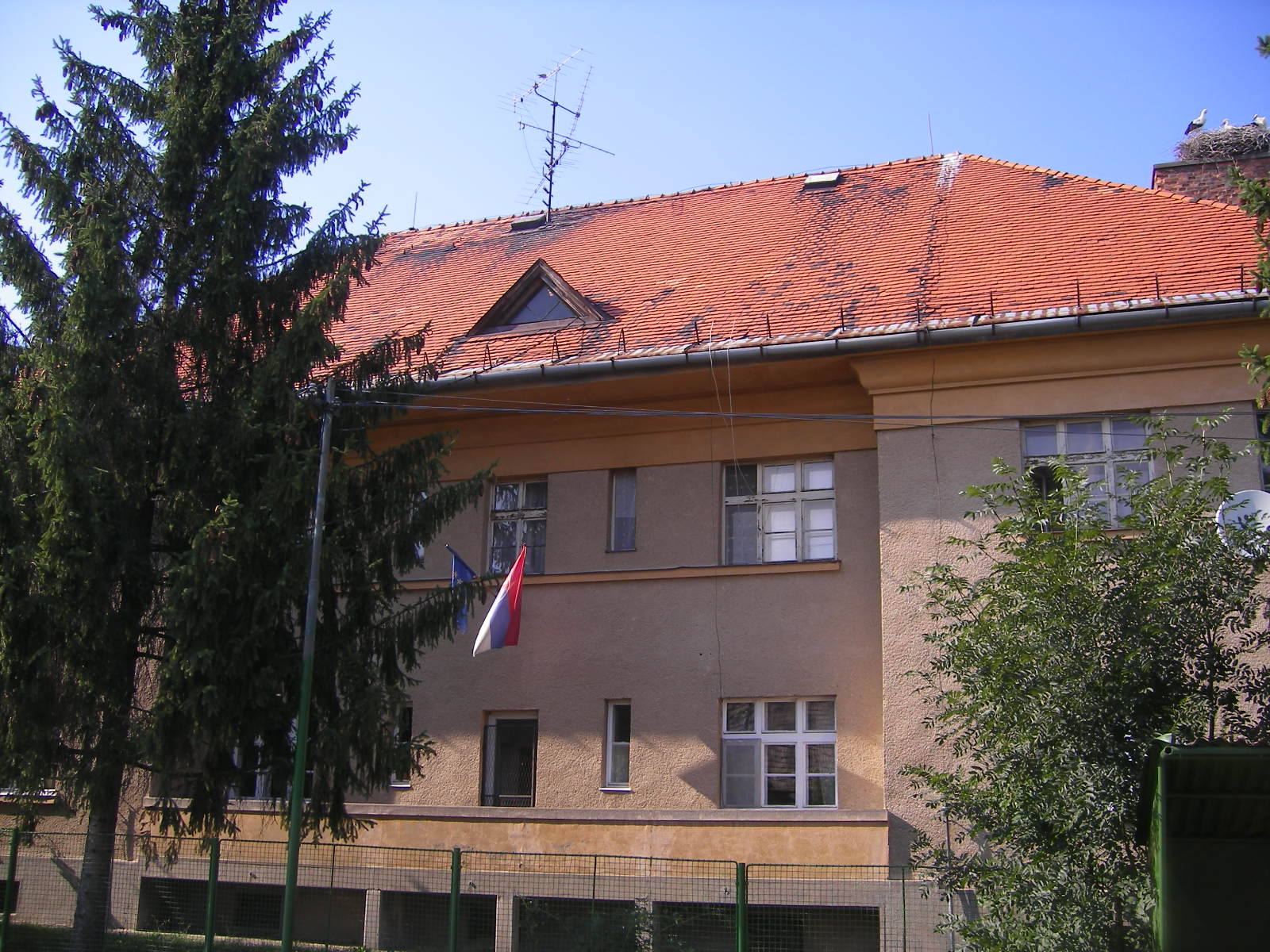

- Location of Balog nad Ipľom in the Banská Bystrica Region Location of Balog nad Ipľom in Slovakia
- Coordinates: 48.08°N 19.13°E
- Country: Slovakia
- Region: Banská Bystrica Region
- District: Veľký Krtíš District
- First mentioned: 1232

Area
  - Total: 8.35 km^{2} (3.22 sq mi)
- Elevation: 135 m (443 ft)

Population (2025)
  - Total: 773
- Time zone: UTC+1 (CET)
  - Summer (DST): UTC+2 (CEST)
- Postal code: 991 11
- Area code: +421 47
- Vehicle registration plate (until 2022): VK
- Website: balognadiplom.sk/sk/

Balog nad Ipl'om (German: Bollig an der Eipel; Hungarian: Ipolybalog) (1232 Bolug, 1351 Balogh) is a village and municipality in the Veľký Krtíš District of the Banská Bystrica Region of southern Slovakia.

== Geography ==
The municipality lies at an altitude of 135 metres (443 ft) and covers an area of 8.35 km^{2} (3.22 sq mi) (2025).

== History ==
In historical records, the village was first mentioned in 1232 when the King of Hungary, Andrew II gave the village to Zvolen (Zólyom) town. After, for four centuries it belonged to local noble family Baloghy (Balogov). From 1939 to 1944 it belonged to Hungary again.

== Population ==
Population statistic (10 years)
Year	1995	2005	2015	2025
Count	843	871	837	773
Difference		+3.32%	−3.90%	−7.64%

Population statistic
Year	2024	2025
Count	774	773
Difference		−0.12%

It has a population of 773 people (31 December 2025).

=== Ethnicity ===
Census 2021 (1+ %)
Ethnicity	Number	Fraction
Hungarian	670	85.78%
Slovak	131	16.77%
Not found out	21	2.68%
Total	781	

In year 2021 was 781 people by ethnicity 670 as Hungarian, 131 as Slovak, 21 as Not found out, 7 as Czech, 4 as Russian, 3 as Other, 2 as Austrian, 1 as Romani, 1 as German and 1 as Bulgarian.

Note on population: The difference values of population numbers in the table "Population statistic" and in the sections "Ethnicity" & "Religion" is caused by the use of various statistical methods.

=== Religion ===
Census 2021 (1+ %)
Religion	Number	Fraction
Roman Catholic Church	715	91.55%
None	38	4.87%
Not found out	9	1.15%
Greek Catholic Church	8	1.02%
Total	781	

In year 2021 was 781 people by religion 715 from Roman Catholic Church, 38 from None, 9 from Not found out, 8 from Greek Catholic Church, 5 from Christian Congregations in Slovakia, 3 from Eastern Orthodox Church, 2 from Calvinist Church and 1 from Other and not ascertained christian church.

== Notable births ==
- Béla Pásztor, mayor of Veresegyház

== Genealogical resources ==
The records for genealogical research are available at the state archive in Banská Bystrica (Slovak: Štátny archív v Banskej Bystrici).

- Roman Catholic church records (births/marriages/deaths): 1771-1895
- Lutheran church records (births/marriages/deaths): 1721-1750, 1784-1862
- Census records 1869 of Balog_nad_Iplom are not available at the state archive.

== See also ==
- List of municipalities and towns in Slovakia
