= Teréz Krammer =

Hungarian opera singer (soprano) (1868–1934)

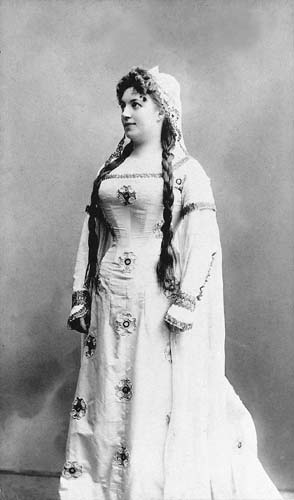
- Born: 2 August 1868; Pest
- Died: 15 June 1934 (aged 65); Csömör
- Citizenship: Hungarian
- Occupation: Opera singer

Teréz Krammer ( 2 August 1868 In Pest – 15 June 1934 In Csömör) was a Hungarian opera singer (soprano).

== Life ==
Her father was a post and telegraph official. Of her six children, only Teréz survived to adulthood. She was a student of Imre Bellovics (voice) and Ede Újházi (acting) at the school of the Society of Music Lovers.

She made her debut at the Leipzig Opera on 3 June 1888 as Micaëla in Carmen, and then sang in Elberfeld and Düsseldorf. In 1891, she appeared as a guest at the Opera House in the roles of Senta (Wagner: Flying Dutchman) and Elisabeth (Wagner: Tannhäuser). Due to negative reviews, she could not find work in Budapest at that time. Between 1892 and 1895 she was a member of the Magdeburg City Theatre. There she met her first husband, the tenor Franz Schmidt (1851–1897). In the summer of 1893 they bought a property in Csömör and were married the following year. In 1895, she followed her husband to Breslau. Schmidt died in Csömör on 8 June 1897. Two years later, Krammer remarried, to the conductor Leopold Weintraub, who Hungarianized his name to Lipót Vágó and worked as a singing teacher in the Hungarian capital.

Krammer was under contract to the Semperoper in Dresden from 1899 to January 1902. After further guest appearances, she signed with the Hungarian State Opera House on 1 February 1902. She made her debut as Melinda in Bánk Bán, to the great delight of Hungarian audiences. She was one of the most popular sopranos of the company for close to a decade.

== Teaching music ==
When her contract in Budapest expired, Krammer signed a two-year contract in Frankfurt. From January 1914, she worked again as a singer at the City Theatre. The outbreak of World War I put an end to her stage career. her career as a singing teacher began after her return in 1914, at the National Conservatory (Nemzeti Zenede), where she was on the teaching staff until 1920. between 1924 and 1931, she taught at the Fodor Music School. In 1928, she celebrated the fortieth anniversary of her professional career. she achieved her greatest success in dramatic roles, mainly in Wagner operas. Between 1903 and 1908, she made numerous gramophone recordings in Budapest.

== Roles ==
- Emil Ábrányi: Monna Vanna – címszerep
- Eugen d'Albert: Káin – Éva
- Adolf Bungert: Nausikaa – Leukothea
- Luigi Cherubini: A vízhordó – Rosette
- Császár György: A kunok – Margit
- Gabriel Dupont: A kecskepásztor – Amalia
- Erkel Ferenc: Hunyadi László – Szilágyi Erzsébet
- Erkel Ferenc: Bánk bán – Melinda
- Otto Fiebach: A királynő tisztje – Anna
- Umberto Giordano: Fedora – Fedora Romazov hercegnő
- Hermann Goetz: A makrancos hölgy – Katalin; Bianka
- Karl Goldmark: Sába királynője – Szulamit
- Karl Goldmark: Berlichingen Götz – Walldorf Adelheid
- Charles Gounod: Faust – Margit
- Richard Heuberger: Manuel Venegas – Egy leány
- Jenő Hubay: Lavotta szerelme – Ilona
- Engelbert Humperdinck: Jancsi és Juliska – Altató manó; Ébresztő manó
- Ruggero Leoncavallo: Bajazzók – Nedda
- Heinrich Marschner: A vámpír – Janthe
- Pietro Mascagni: Parasztbecsület – Santuzza
- Jules Massenet: La Navarraise – Anita
- Giacomo Meyerbeer: A hugenották – Valentine; Urbain
- Giacomo Meyerbeer: A próféta – Berta
- Giacomo Meyerbeer: Az afrikai nő – Anna
- Wolfgang Amadeus Mozart: Figaro lakodalma – Barbarina
- Wolfgang Amadeus Mozart: Don Giovanni – Donna Anna
- Wolfgang Amadeus Mozart: A varázsfuvola – Pamina; Első hölgy
- Viktor Nessler: A säkkingeni trombitás – Maria
- Victor Neßler: A hamelni patkányfogó – Regina
- Otto Nicolai: A windsori víg nők – Fluthné; Reich Anna
- Ignacy Jan Paderewski: Manru – Asa
- Giacomo Puccini: Manon Lescaut – címszerep
- Giacomo Puccini: Tosca – Floria Tosca
- Giacomo Puccini: Bohémélet – Mimì
- Rékai Nándor: A nagyidai cigányok – Héla
- William Shakespeare–Felix Mendelssohn: Szentivánéji álom – Tündér
- Bedřich Smetana: Az eladott menyasszony – Mařenka
- Johann Strauss: Die Fledermaus – Rosalinda
- Johann Strauss : A cigánybáró – Szaffi
- Johann Strauss : 1001 éj – Leila
- Richard Strauss: Elektra – címszerep
- Franz von Suppé: A szép Galatea – Galatea
- Szabados Béla: Mária – címszerep
- Giuseppe Verdi: A trubadúr – Inez
- Giuseppe Verdi: Aida – címszerep
- Richard Wagner: Cola Rienzi, az utolsó néptribun – Irene
- Richard Wagner: A bolygó hollandi – Senta
- Richard Wagner: Tannhäuser... – Erzsébet; Vénusz
- Richard Wagner: Lohengrin – Brabanti Elza; Első nemesi apród
- Richard Wagner: A nürnbergi mesterdalnokok – Eva
- Richard Wagner: A Nibelung gyűrűje – Brünnhilde; Woglinde; Gutrune; Sieglinde; Freia; Ortlinde; Harmadik norna
- Richard Wagner: Parsifal – Kundry
- Carl Maria von Weber: A bűvös vadász – Agathe; Egy nyoszolyólány
- Carl Maria von Weber: Euryanthe – Bertha
- Carl Maria von Weber: Oberon – Roschana
- Zichy Géza: Nemo – Badinyi Klára
- Zichy Géza: Rodostó – Hesseni Amália Sarolta
