= Pasztor =

Pásztor is a surname of Hungarian origin. People with that name include:

- Ákos Pásztor (born 1991), Hungarian handball player
- Andy Pasztor (active from 1995), American journalist
- Austin Pasztor (born 1990), American football player
- Béla Pásztor (born 1938), Hungarian politician
- Bence Pásztor (born 1995), Hungarian hammer thrower
- Bettina Pásztor (born 1992), Hungarian handball player
- Gábor Pásztor (born 1982), Hungarian sprinter
- István Pásztor (disambiguation), multiple people
- János Pásztor (sculptor) (1881–1945), Hungarian sculptor
- János Pásztor (diplomat) (born 1955), Hungarian diplomat
- Szabolcs Pásztor (born 1959), Hungarian fencer

== See also ==
- Pásztori, a village in Győr-Moson-Sopron county, Hungary
