= Gödöllő District =

Gödöllő District Gödöllői járás
- Districts of Hungary
- Coat of arms

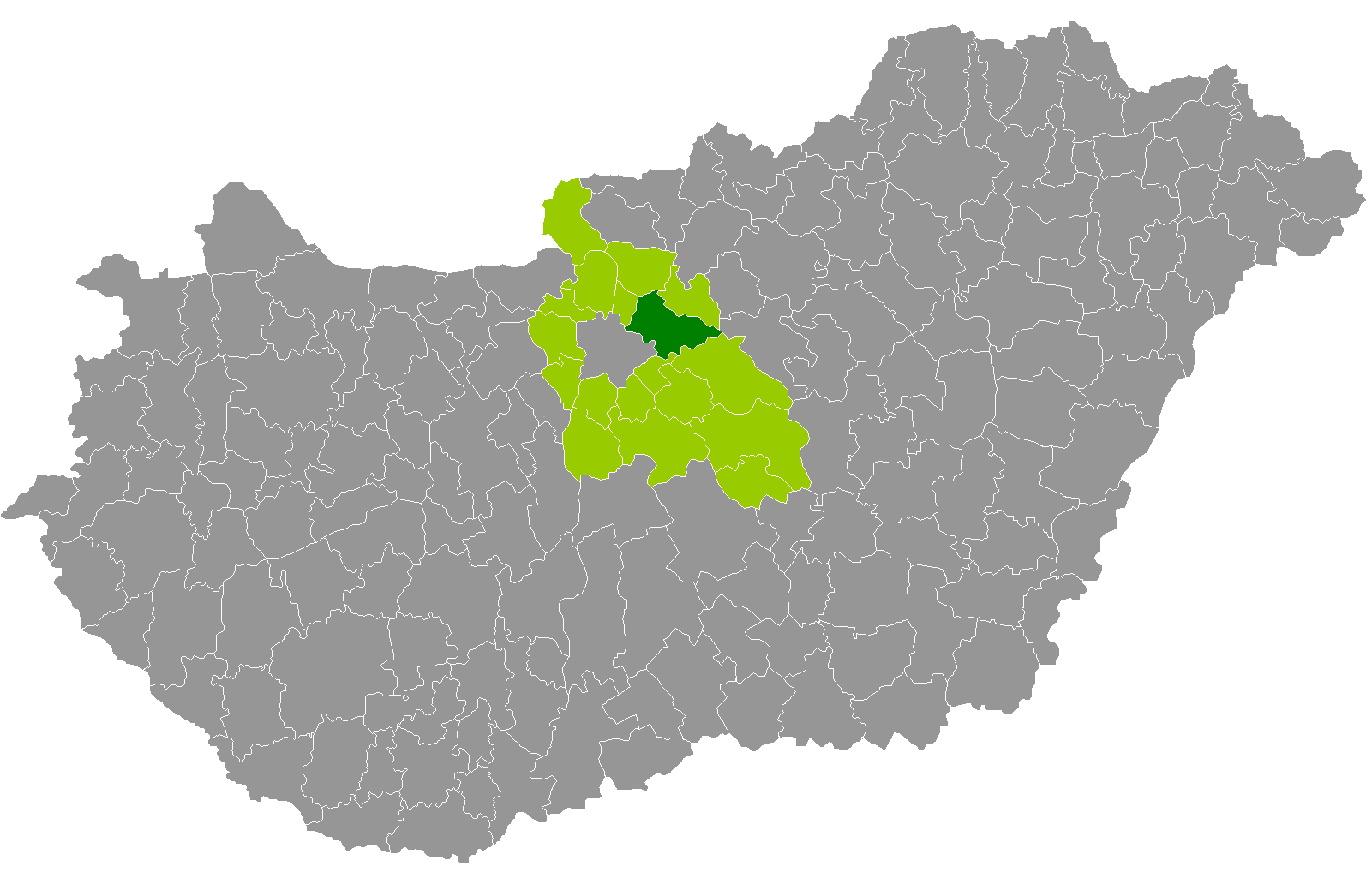
- Gödöllő District within Hungary and Pest County.
- Coordinates: 47.60°N 19.36°E
- Country: Hungary
- County: Pest
- District seat: Gödöllő

Area
  - Total: 449.66 km^{2} (173.61 sq mi)
  - Rank: 4th in Pest

Population (2011 census)
  - Total: 139,826
  - Rank: 1st in Pest
  - Density: 310.96/km^{2} (805.38/sq mi)

Gödöllő (Hungarian: Gödöllői járás) is a district in central-northern part of Pest County. Gödöllő is also the name of the town where the district seat is found. The district is located in the Central Hungary Statistical Region.

== Geography ==
Gödöllő District borders with Aszód District to the northeast, Nagykáta District to the southeast, Vecsés District to the south, Budapest to the southwest, Dunakeszi District to the west, Vác District to the northwest. The number of the inhabited places in Gödöllő District is 15.

=== Gödöllő Hill Region ===
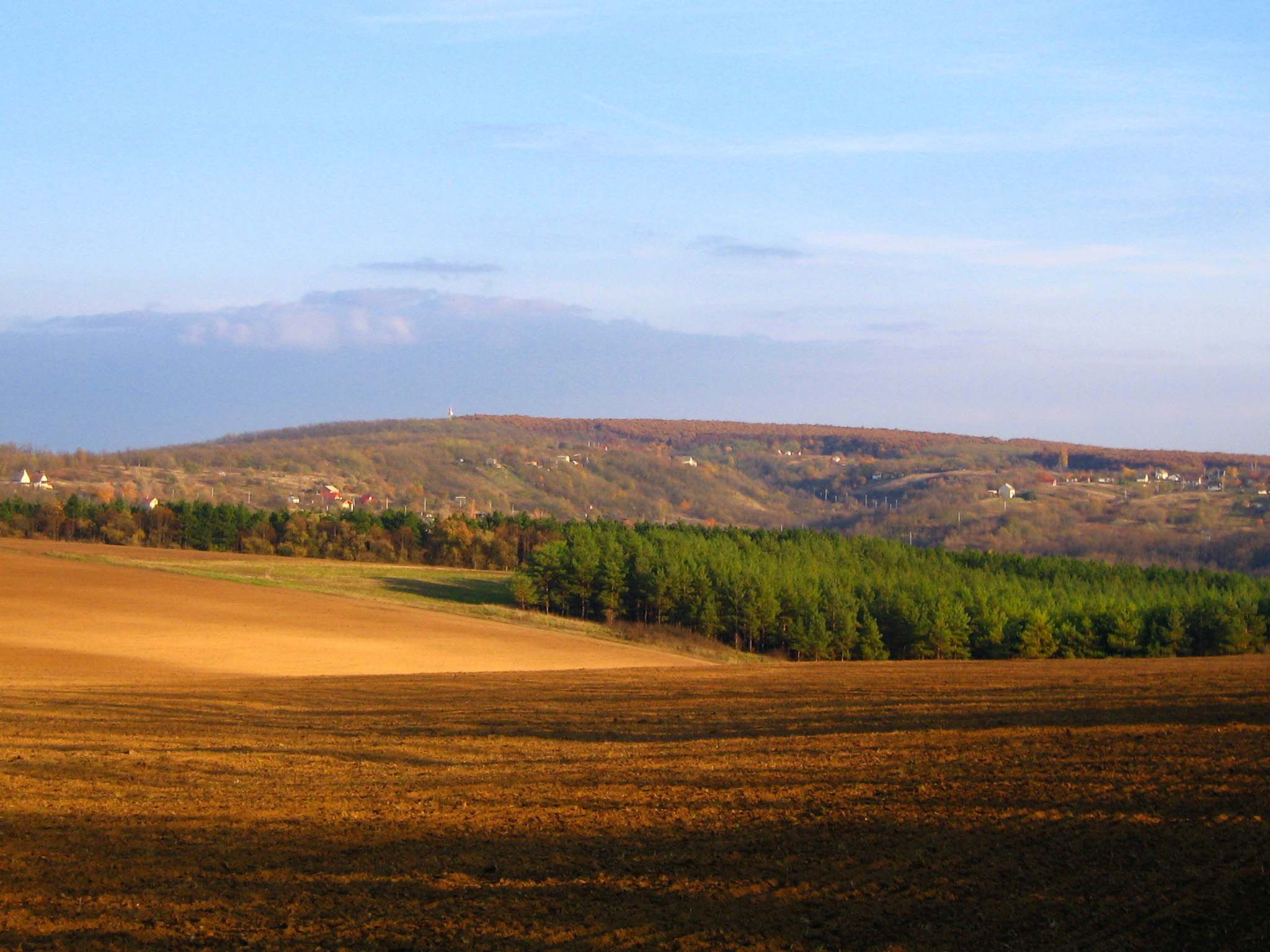
Hills of Gödöllő

The Hills of Gödöllő is a small-region in Pest county, from the east of Budapest to the River Galga. To the north the Cserhát, to the south and to the east the Alföld and finally to the west the River Danube and the Hills of Buda borders it. As a big landscape, it is part of the Északi-középhegység, but its form is rather a transition between mountains and plains.

The average height of 150 to 250 m (492 to 820 ft) above sea level hills are mostly covered with sand and loess. The highest point of this small-region is Margita in Szada with its 345 m (1,132 ft). There is a watershed which also extends through Margita and runs to Albertirsa. From this line, to the west brooks streams into the Danube and to the east into the River Galga which goes into the Tisza.

The most common forest-compositions are maple-oak forest, and lime-oak forest. These forest patches are separated by loess-covered moorlands. Perhaps the most well-known swampy area is the Merzse-mocsár which is located on the edge of Budapest's XVII. district. Mammals found in the area include deer, roe deer and boar whilst the birdlife contains species such as eagles. Very common bird species are European bee-eater, black woodpecker, green woodpecker, common kingfisher, common pheasant, honey buzzard, Eurasian hobby, and saker falcon.

A smaller region of the Hills became protected in the summer of 1990. The "Gödöllői Dombvidék Tájvédelmi Körzetet" (Hills of Gödöllő Conservation Area) was established here.

== Municipalities ==
The district has 6 towns, 4 large villages and 5 villages. (ordered by population, as of 1 January 2013)

- Csömör (9,077)
- Dány (4,424)
- Erdőkertes (7,505)
- **Gödöllő** (32,792) – district seat
- **Isaszeg** (11,210)
- **Kerepes** (9,943)
- **Kistarcsa** (12,046)
- Mogyoród (6,375)
- Nagytarcsa (3,883)
- **Pécel** (15,123)
- Szada (4,675)
- Vácszentlászló (2,040)
- Valkó (2,427)
- **Veresegyház** (16,333)
- Zsámbok (2,352)

The bolded municipalities are cities, italics municipalities are large villages.

== Demographics ==
Religion in Gödöllő District (2011 census)
1. Catholic Church (35.7%)
2. Greek Catholicism (0.80%)
3. Calvinism (10.5%)
4. Lutheranism (2.80%)
5. Other religions (3.00%)
6. Non-religious (16.3%)
7. Atheists (1.80%)
8. Undeclared (29.1%)

In 2011, it had a population of 139,826 and the population density was 311/km^{2}.

| Year | County population | Change |
|---|---|---|
| 2011 | 139,826 | n/a |

=== Ethnicity ===
Besides the Hungarian majority, the main minorities are the Roma (approx. 2,800), German (1,600), Slovak (1,000), Romanian (650), Russian (300), Polish (150), Ukrainian and Bulgarian (100).

Total population (2011 census): 139,826
Ethnic groups (2011 census): Identified themselves: 129,792 persons:

- Hungarians: 120,988 (93.22%)
- Gypsies: 2,774 (2.14%)
- Germans: 1,641 (1.26%)
- Others and indefinable: 4,389 (3.38%)

Approx. 10,000 persons in Gödöllő District did not declare their ethnic group at the 2011 census.

=== Religion ===
Religious adherence in the county according to 2011 census:

- Catholic – 51,043 (Roman Catholic – 49,899; Greek Catholic – 1,128);
- Reformed – 14,691;
- Evangelical – 3,871;
- other religions – 4,244;
- Non-religious – 22,780;
- Atheism – 2,584;
- Undeclared – 40,613.

== Gallery ==
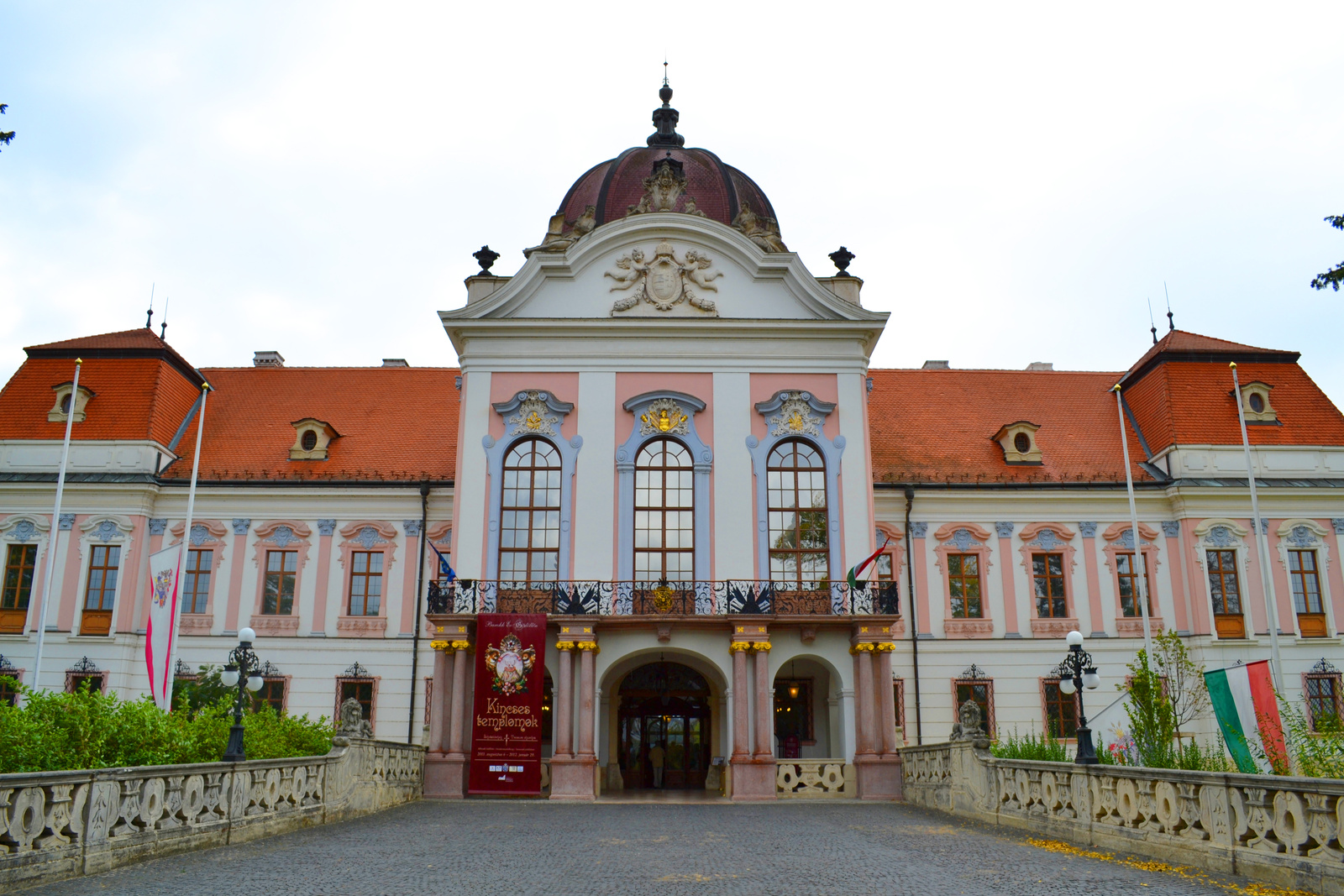
Gödöllő Palace

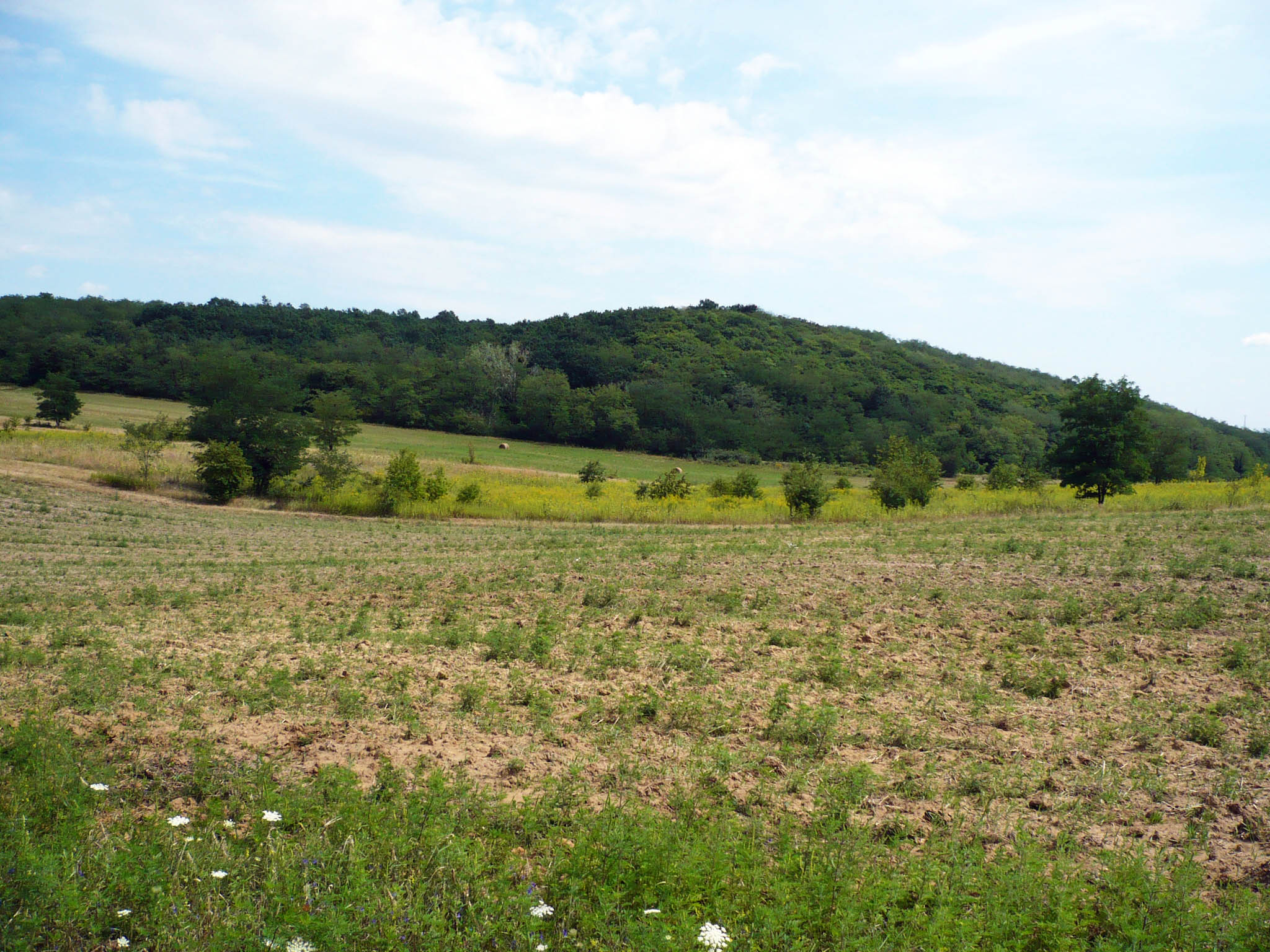
Landscape near Veresegyház

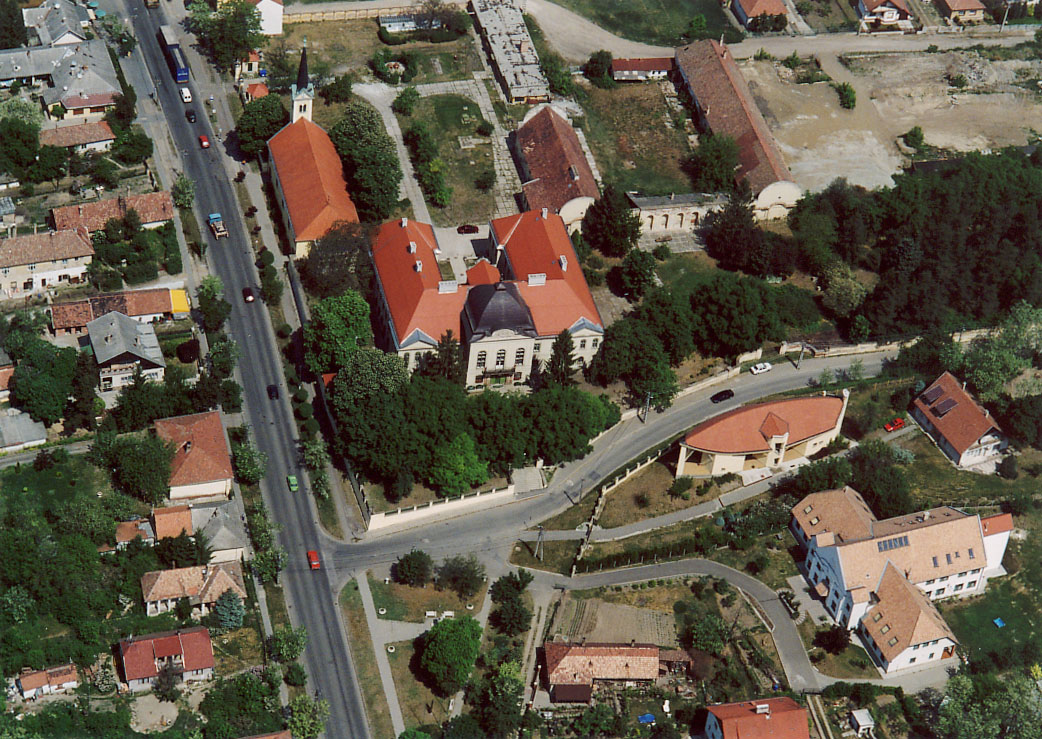
Ráday Mansion in Pécel

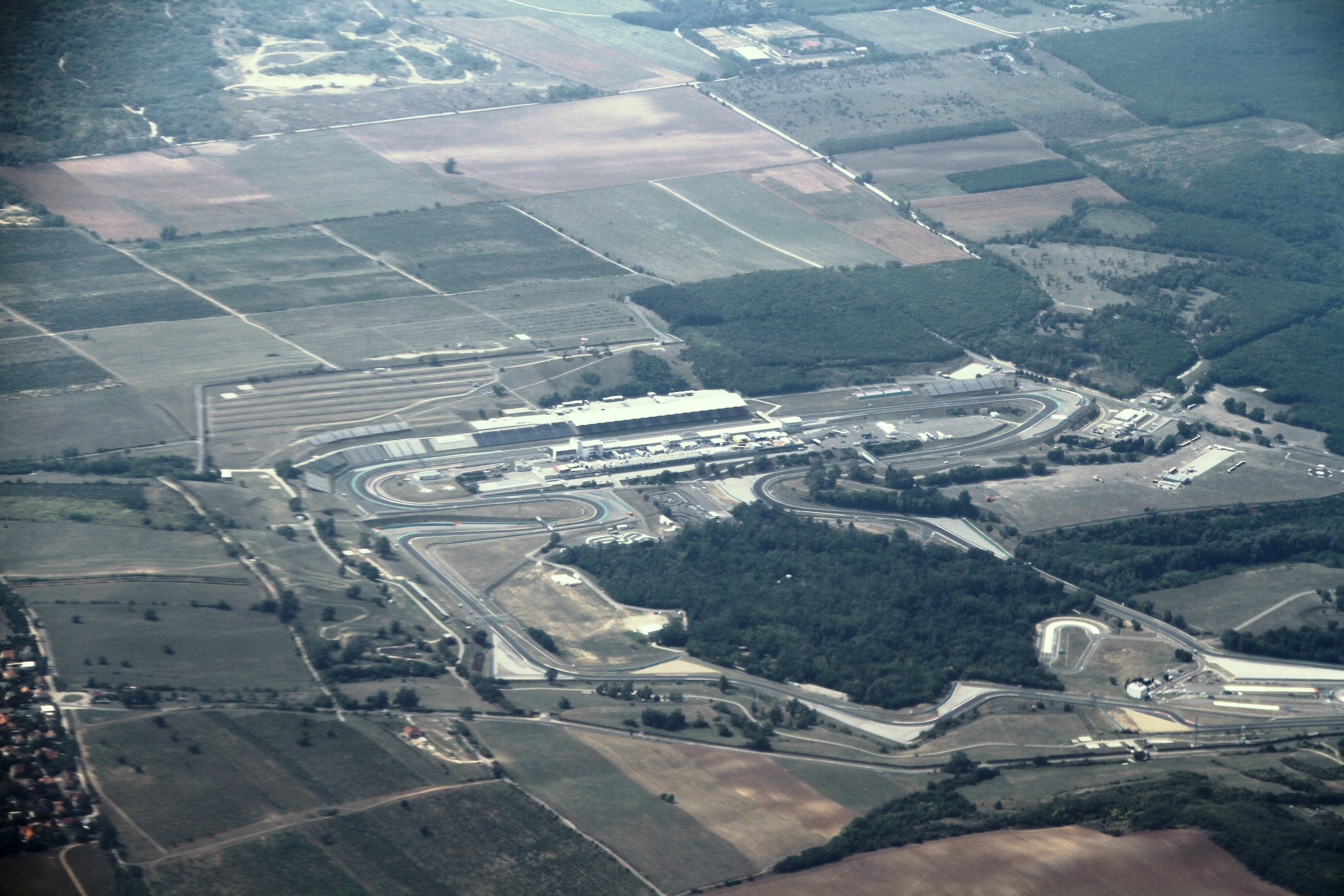
Hungaroring

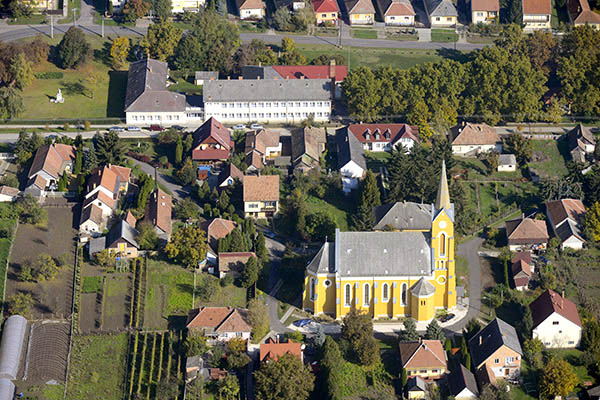
Aerial view of Dány

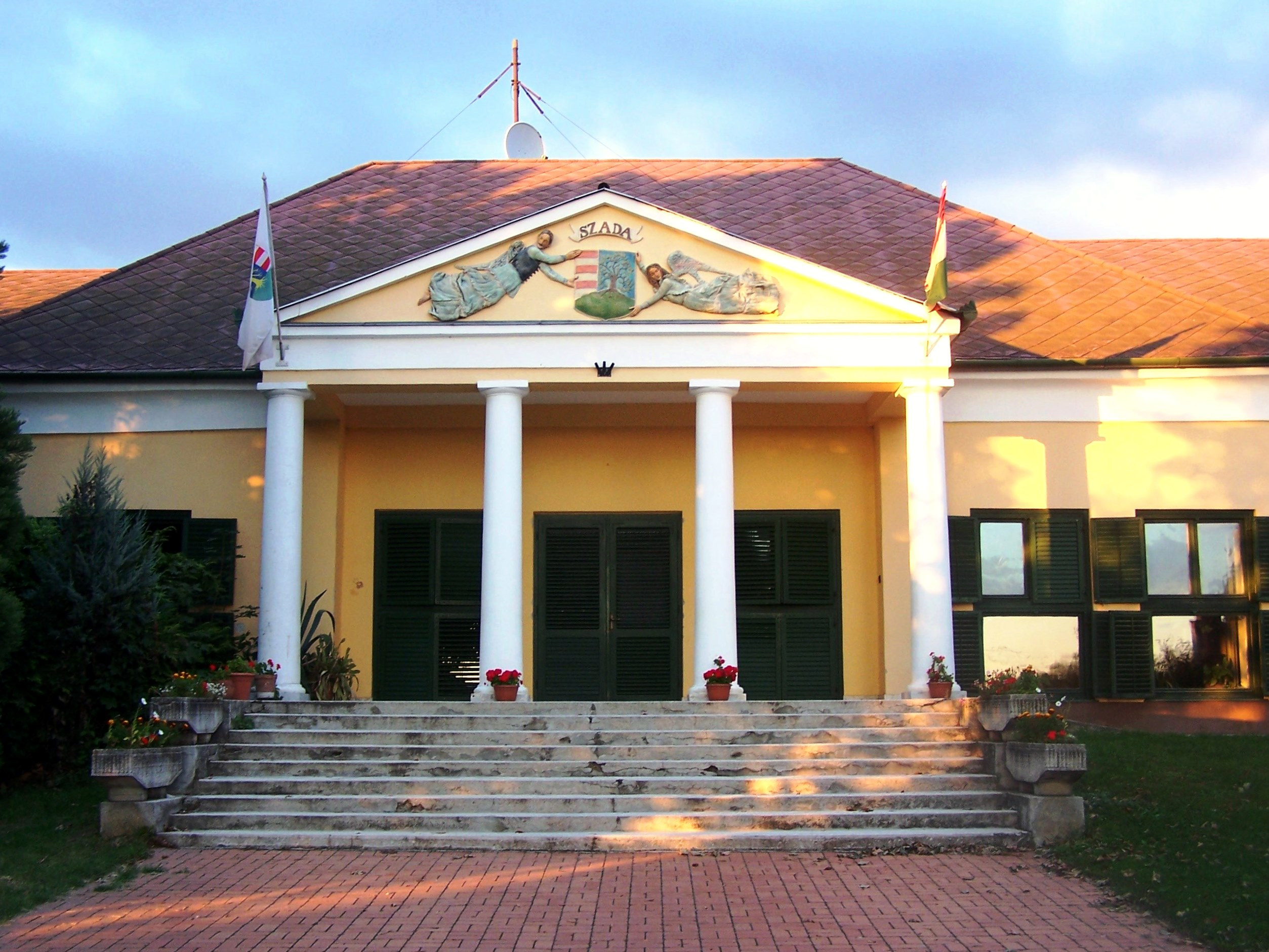
Grassalkovich-Pejacsevich Mansion in Szada

== See also ==
- List of cities and towns in Hungary
