= Béla Pásztor =

Hungarian politician

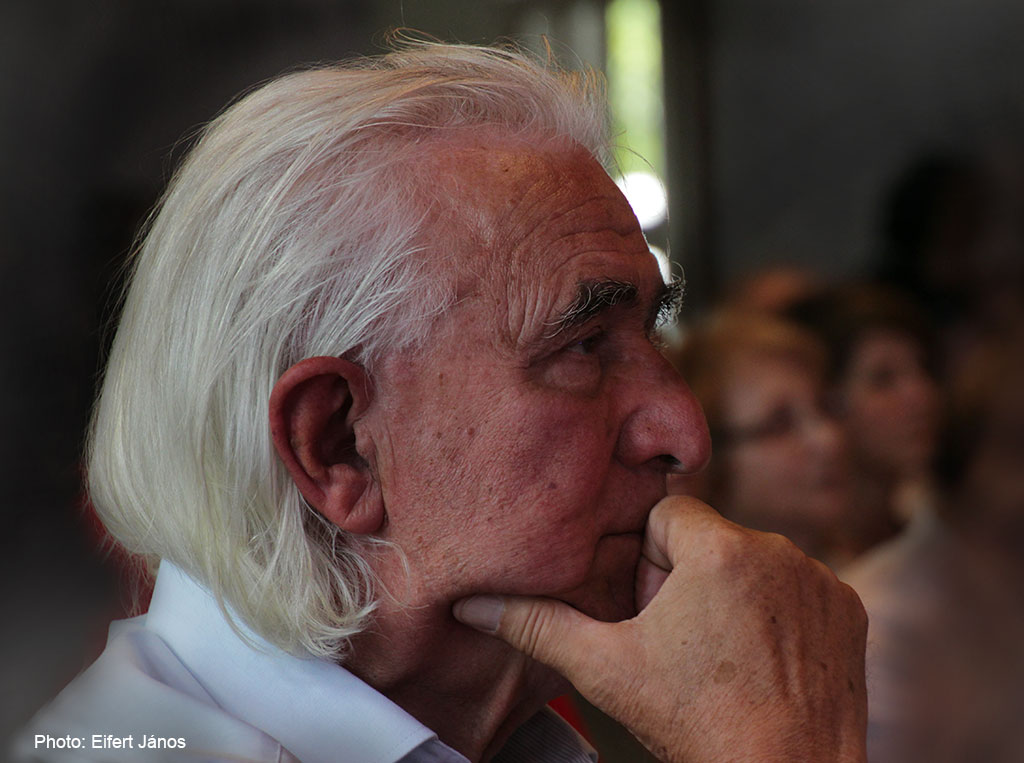
- Pásztor in 2017

Mayor of Veresegyház
- In office 12 October 1990 – 28 February 2023
- Preceded by: himself as Chairman of the Council
- Succeeded by: Ferenc Cserháti

Chairman of the Council of Veresegyház
- In office 1 September 1965 – 12 October 1990
- Preceded by: ?
- Succeeded by: himself as Mayor

Personal details
- Born: 27 February 1938 (age 88) Balog nad Ipľom, Czechoslovakia
- Party: Independent
- Profession: politician

Béla Pásztor (born 27 February 1938) is a Hungarian politician, who served as Chairman of the Council then Mayor of Veresegyház from 1 September 1965.

Pásztor resigned on 28 February 2023.

With 25 years spent as chairman of council (the Communist era version of mayor), then 32 years as mayor, he holds the record as the longest serving leader of a municipality in Hungary.

Political offices
| Preceded by ? | Council chairman of Veresegyház; 1965–1990 | Succeeded by Himself as mayor |
| Preceded by Himself as council chairman | Mayor of Veresegyház; 1990–2023 | Succeeded by Ferenc Cserháti |
