= Gloria Victis Memorial =

Memorial in Csömör, Hungary

Coordinates: 47°32′34″N 19°13′37″E

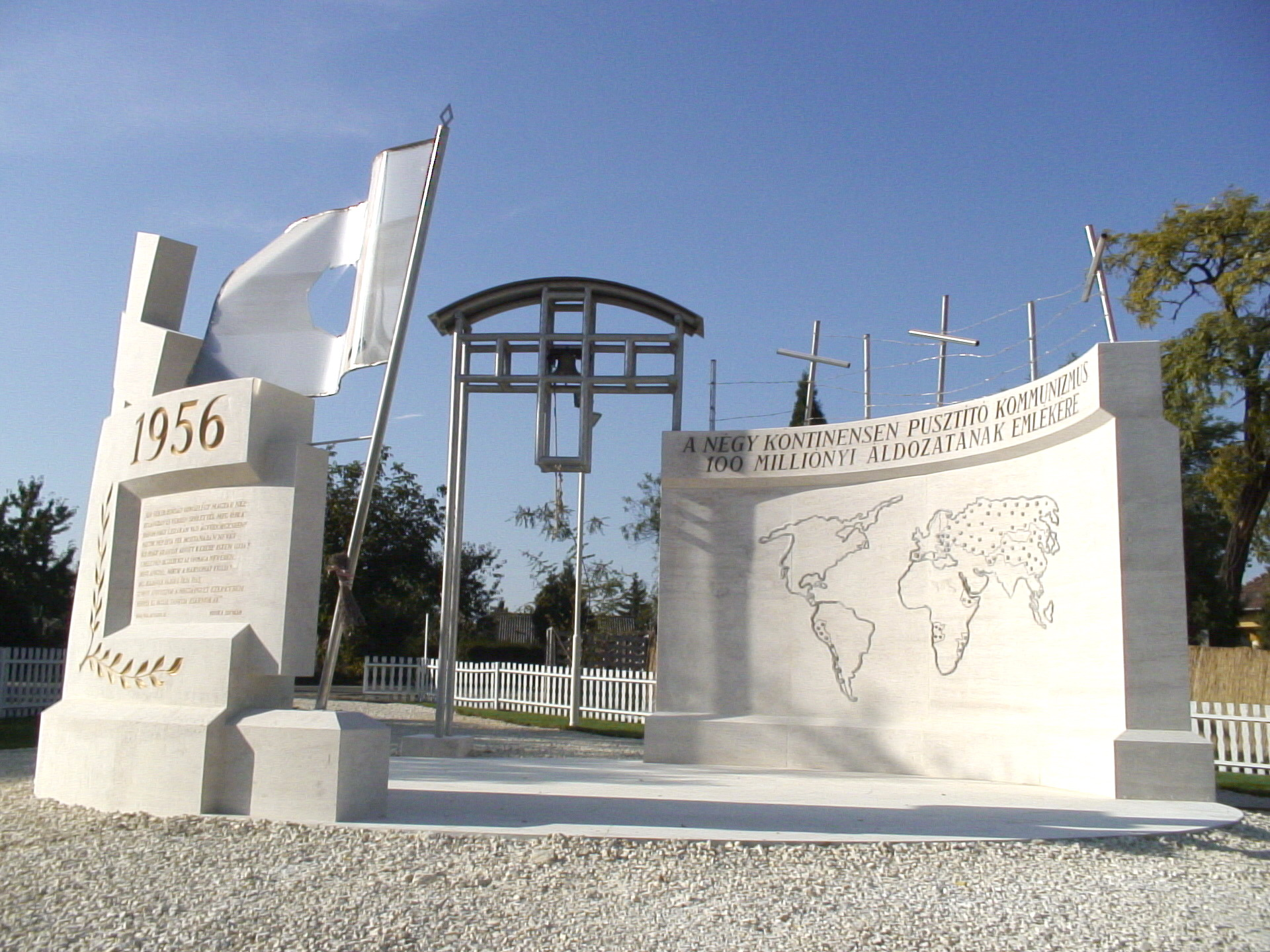
The memorial

The Gloria Victis Memorial created in honor of the casualties of universal communism is situated adjacent to the cemetery of the town of Csömör near the North Eastern boundary of Budapest.

== Dedication ==
The memorial, being the first on this subject in the world, was consecrated and blessed on 21 October 2006 marking the occasion of the fiftieth anniversary of the Hungarian Revolution of 1956. On that day addresses were delivered by László Tőkés, Rainer Eppelmann and others. The chief patron of the celebration was Viktor Orbán.

== Description ==
The memorial was constructed adjacent to the graves of three Hungarian soldiers who died in 1944. A twin memorial, the work of János Víg is at its center. Placed on the circular stone there are the maps of the four continents shifted with respect to each other, with the affected areas marked with lead castings explaining the extent of the devastation visually. The section of the memorial alluding to ’56 can be construed as a victorious flag-carrier warship, indicating the fact that the Hungarian revolution was the first to succeed in forcing a break in the concrete wall of world-communism. In October 2008 a summary in three languages of the Resolution 1481 (2006) of the Council of Europe entitled The Necessity of International Condemnation of the Crimes Committed by Totalitarian Communist Regimes was carved on the back of the “world wall”. The two initiators of the aforementioned resolution, Göran Lindblad of Sweden and Latshezar Toshev of Bulgaria were the orators at the ceremony of the handing over of this text. In the years since, the memorial has been enriched by the Holodomor memorial stone donated by the Ukrainian minority in Hungary, by the tablet commemorating the Molotov–Ribbentrop pact, as well as the marble tablets honoring the memory of those slaughtered at Katyn and the Romani people (gypsy) and Jewish victims of communism. The memorial was created and is maintained by the Gloria Victis Foundation.

== Gallery ==
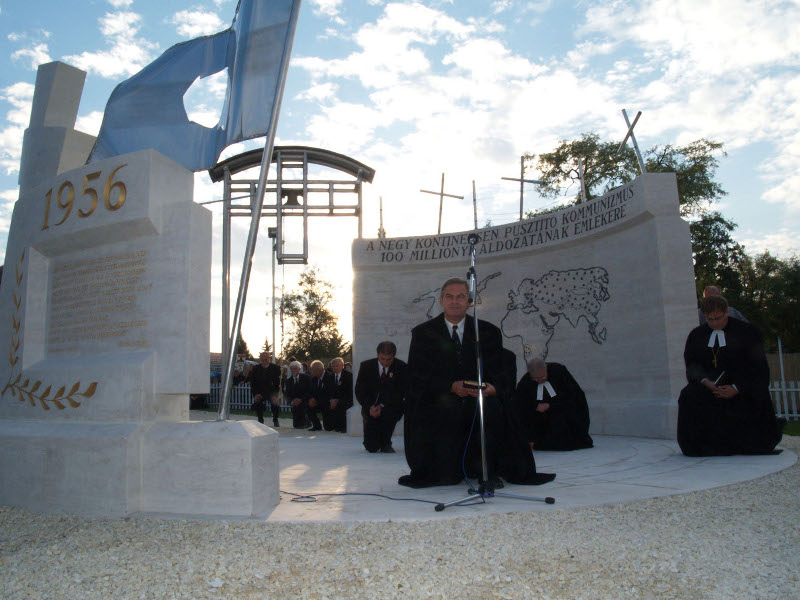
Dedication and blessing

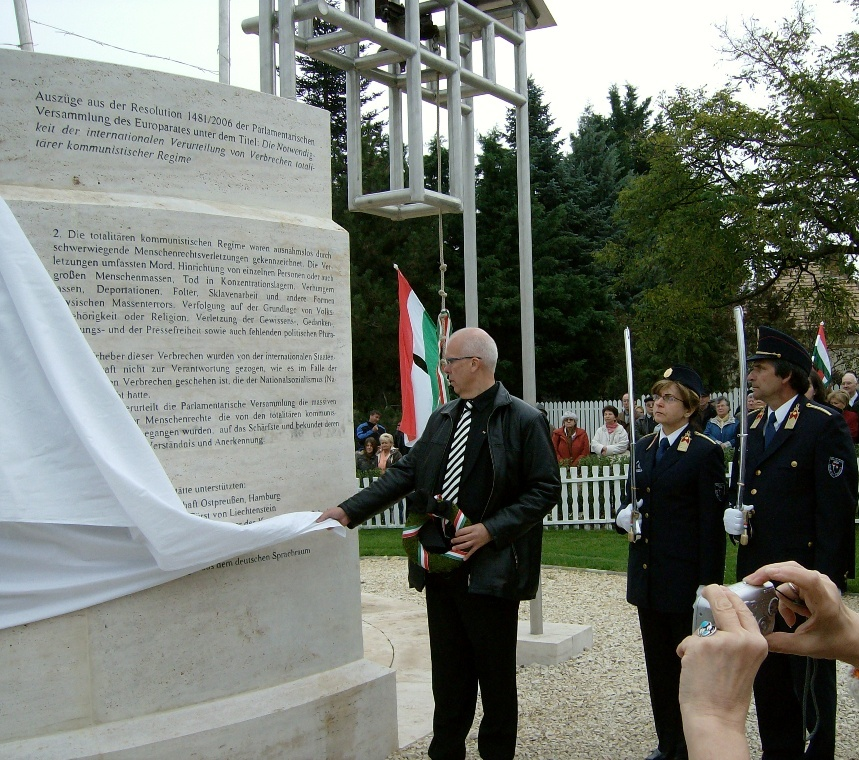
Göran Lindblad hands over the carved text of Resolution 1481 (2006)

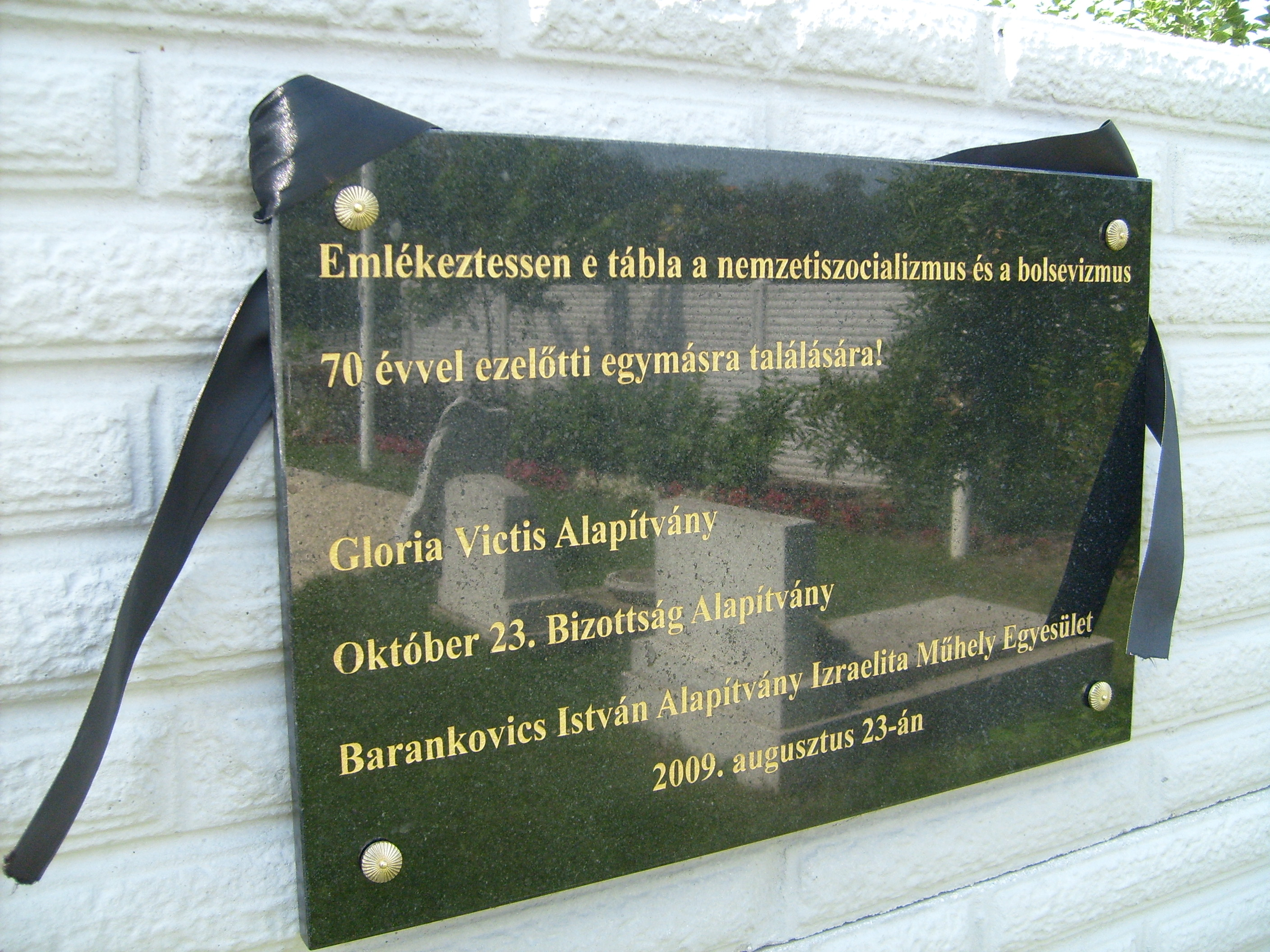
Tablet commemorating the national socialist – communist pact of 1939

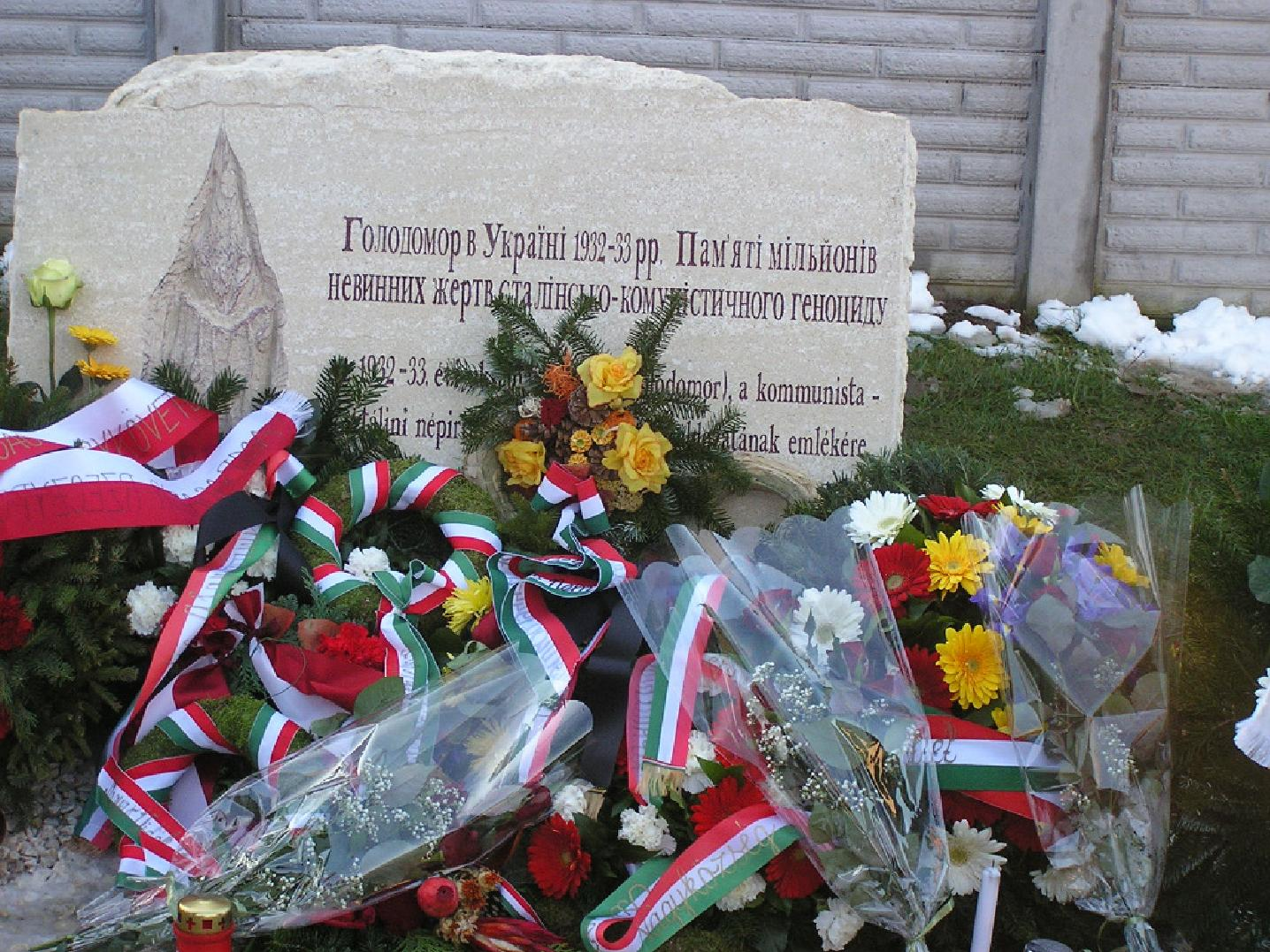
Holodomor Memorial Stone
