= Szada =

- Village
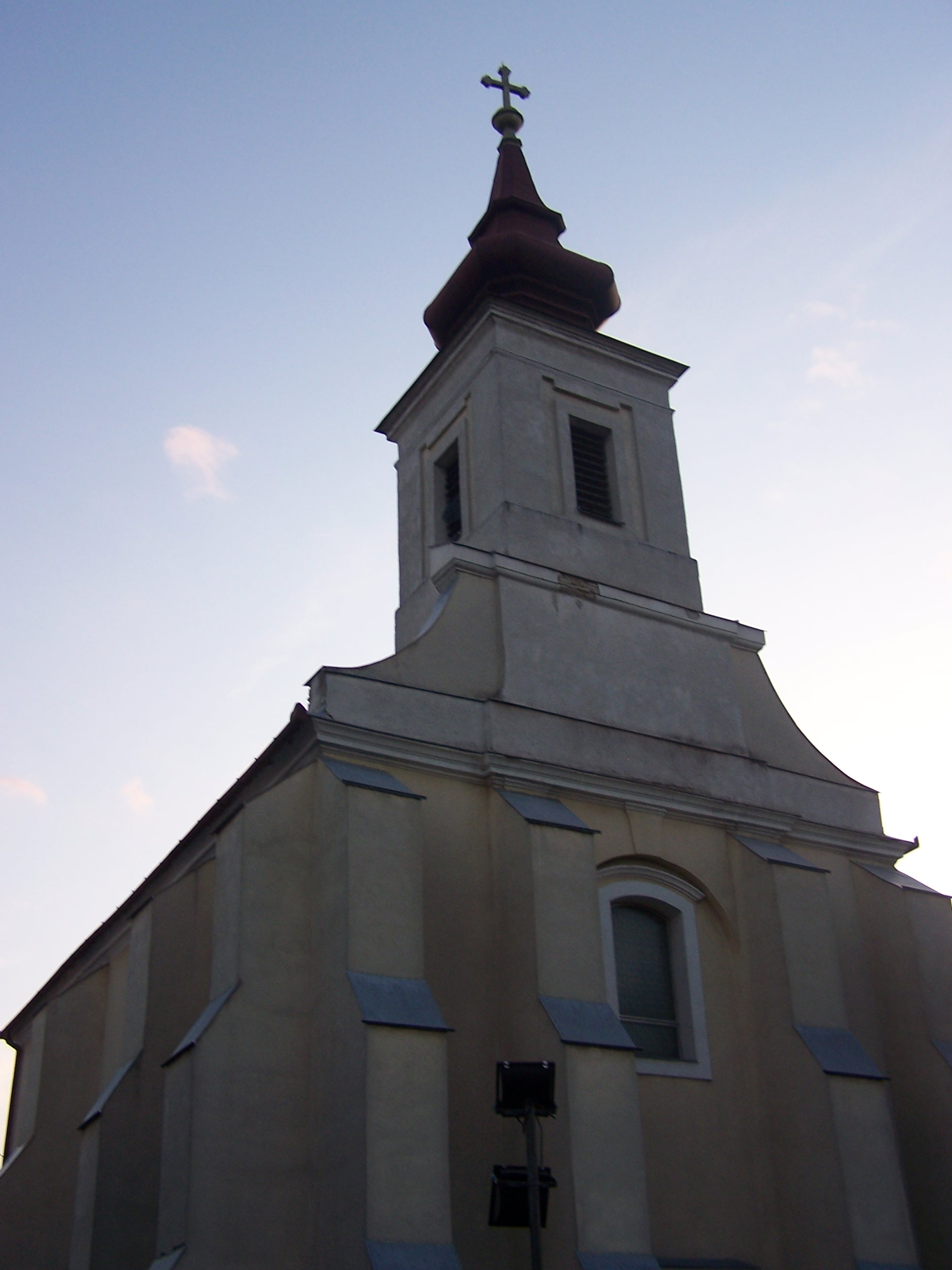

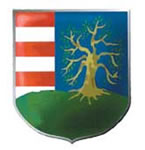
- Coat of arms

- Location of Szada in Hungary
- Coordinates: 47.63721°N 19.31124°E
- Country: Hungary
- Region: Central Hungary
- County: Pest
- Subregion: Gödöllői
- Rank: Village

Area
  - Total: 16.69 km^{2} (6.44 sq mi)

Population (2022)
  - Total: 6,325
  - Density: 379.0/km^{2} (981.5/sq mi)
- Time zone: UTC+1 (CET)
  - Summer (DST): UTC+2 (CEST)
- Postal code: 2111
- Area code: +36 28
- KSH code: 21458
- Website: www.szada.hu

Szada is a village in the Gödöllő District of Pest county, Budapest metropolitan area, Hungary.

== Location ==
The village is located in the Gödöllő Hills area. Its main road is part of the Gödöllő-Vác road (Route 2104). Szada's bordering villages/towns: Gödöllő, Veresegyház, Mogyoród
