= István Pásztor =

István Pásztor may refer to:

- István Pásztor (politician) (1956–2023), Serbian politician of Hungarian descent
- István Pásztor (Slovak politician) (born 1957)
- István Pásztor (cyclist) (1926–2015), Hungarian cyclist
- István Pásztor (handballer) (born 1971), Hungarian handballer

== See also ==
- Pasztor (disambiguation)
