= Dunakeszi District =

District within Hungary and Pest County

Coordinates: 47.6333°N 19.1500°E

Dunakeszi District Dunakeszi járás
- Districts of Hungary
- Coat of arms

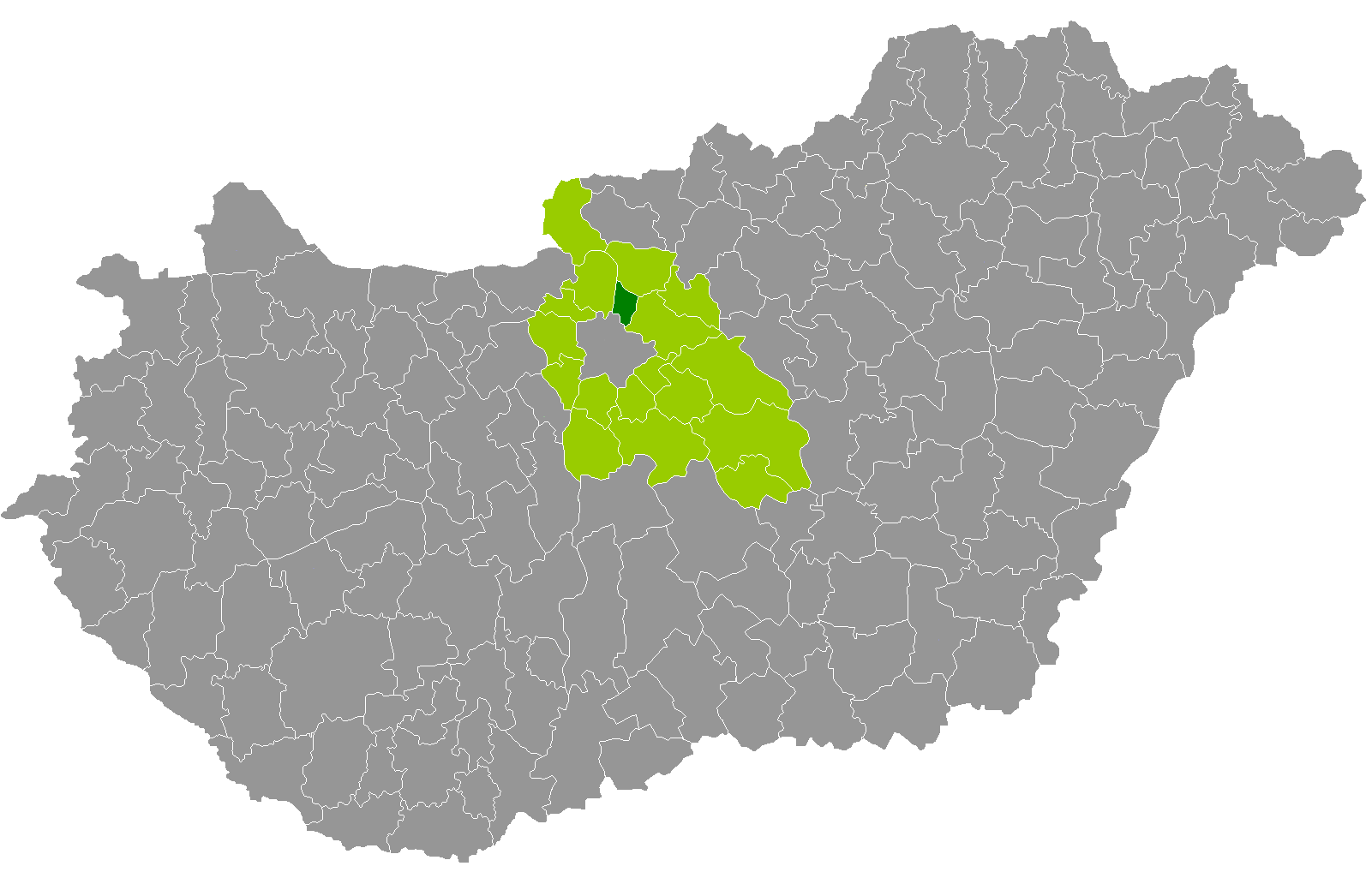
- Dunakeszi District within Hungary and Pest County.
- Country: Hungary
- County: Pest
- District seat: Dunakeszi

Area
  - Total: 103.08 km^{2} (39.80 sq mi)
  - Rank: 18th in Pest

Population (2011 census)
  - Total: 78,634
  - Rank: 6th in Pest
  - Density: 763/km^{2} (1,980/sq mi)

Dunakeszi (Hungarian: Dunakeszi járás) is a district in central-northern part of Pest County. Dunakeszi is also the name of the town where the district seat is found. The district is located in the Central Hungary Statistical Region.

== Geography ==
Dunakeszi District borders with Vác District to the north, Gödöllő District to the east, Budapest to the south, Szentendre District to the west. The number of the inhabited places in Dunakeszi District is 4.

== Municipalities ==
The district has 3 towns and 1 village. (ordered by population, as of 1 January 2013)

- Csomád (1,546)
- **Dunakeszi** (40,441) – district seat
- **Fót** (18,927)
- **Göd** (17,843)

The bolded municipalities are cities.

== Demographics ==
Religion in Dunakeszi District (2011 census)
1. Catholic Church (28.9%)
2. Greek Catholicism (0.90%)
3. Calvinism (9.80%)
4. Lutheranism (2.20%)
5. Orthodoxy (0.10%)
6. Judaism (0.10%)
7. Other religions (2.10%)
8. Non-religious (19.8%)
9. Atheists (2.50%)
10. Undeclared (33.6%)

In 2011, it had a population of 78,634 and the population density was 763/km^{2}.

Year	County population	Change
2011	78,634	n/a

=== Ethnicity ===
Besides Hungarian majority, the main minorities are the German (approx. 800), Roma (550), Slovak (350), Romanian (300) and Russian (150).

Total population (2011 census): 78,634
Ethnic groups (2011 census): Identified themselves: 70,028 persons:

- Hungarians: 66,372 (94.78%)
- Germans: 804 (1.15%)
- Others and indefinable: 2,852 (4.07%)

Approx. 8,500 persons in Dunakeszi District did not declare their ethnic group at the 2011 census.

=== Religion ===
Religious adherence in the county according to 2011 census:

- Catholic – 23,404 (Roman Catholic – 22,690; Greek Catholic – 694);
- Reformed – 7,736;
- Evangelical – 1,772;
- Orthodox – 82;
- Judaism – 104;
- other religions – 1,640;
- Non-religious – 15,560;
- Atheism – 1,950;
- Undeclared – 26,386.

== Gallery ==
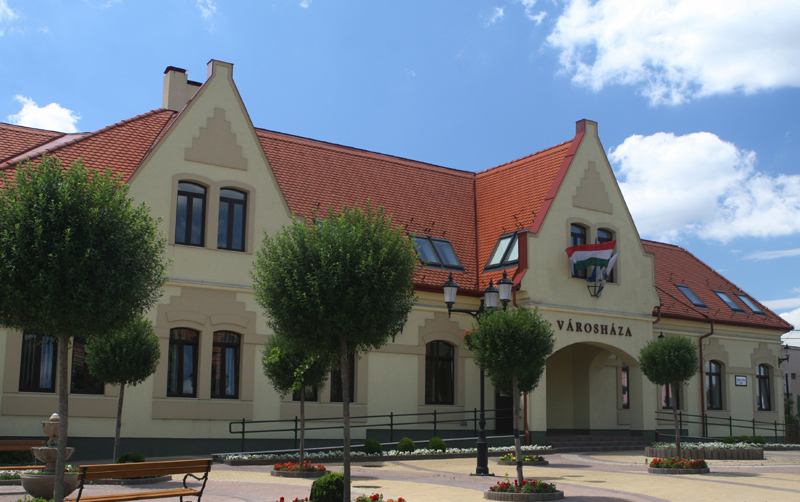
Dunakeszi, Town Hall

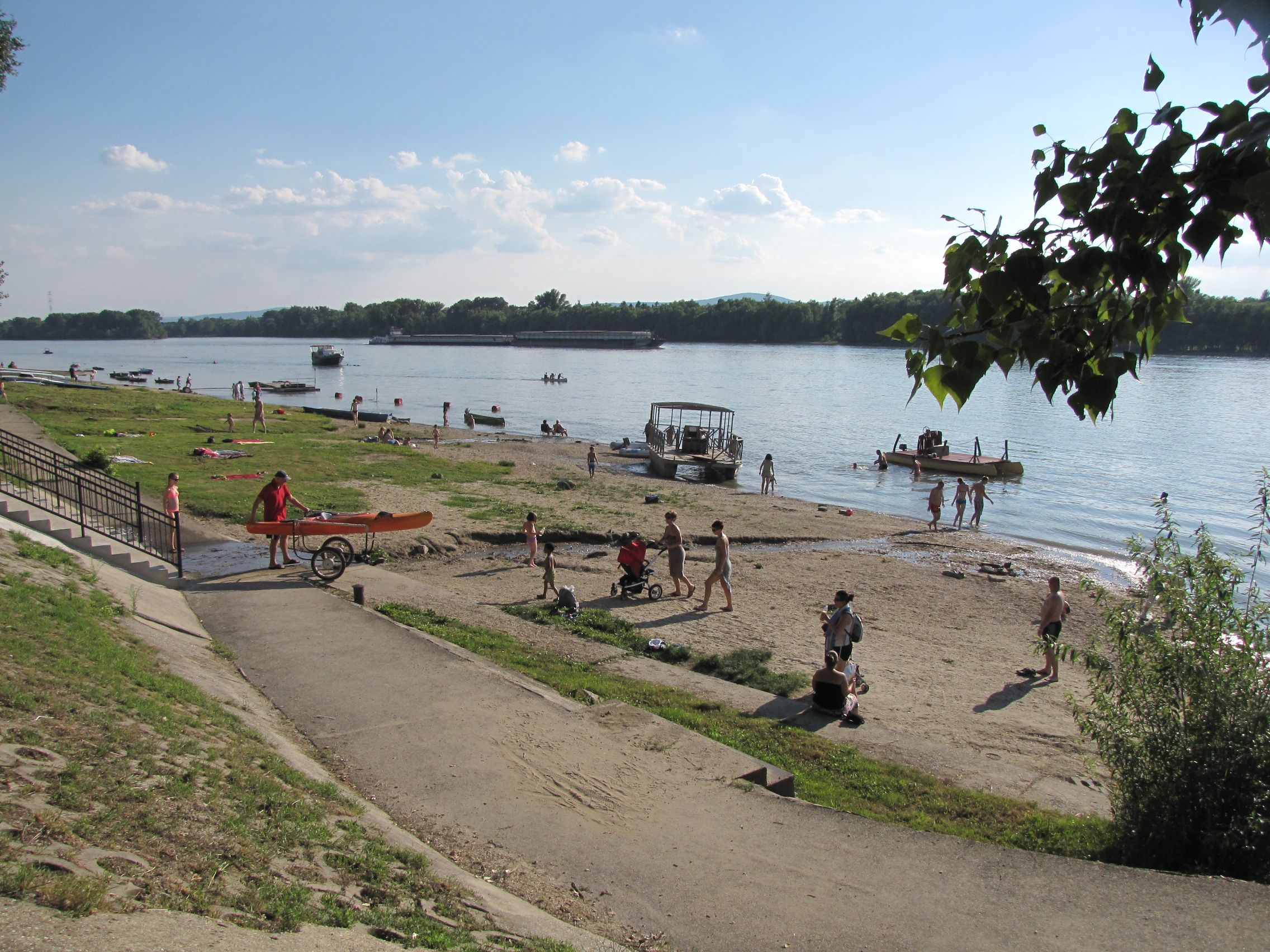
Danube river in Göd

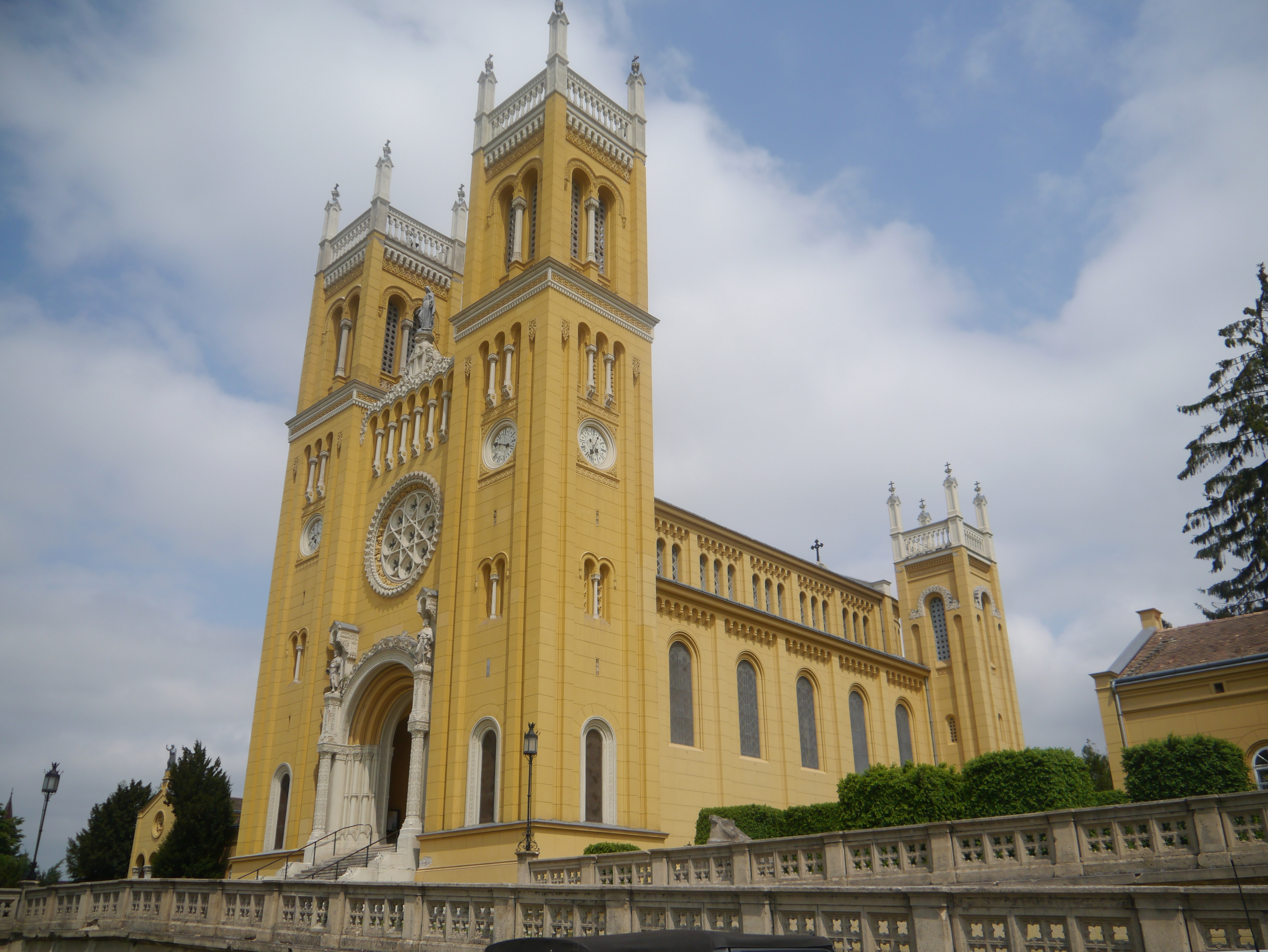
Roman Catholic Church in Fót

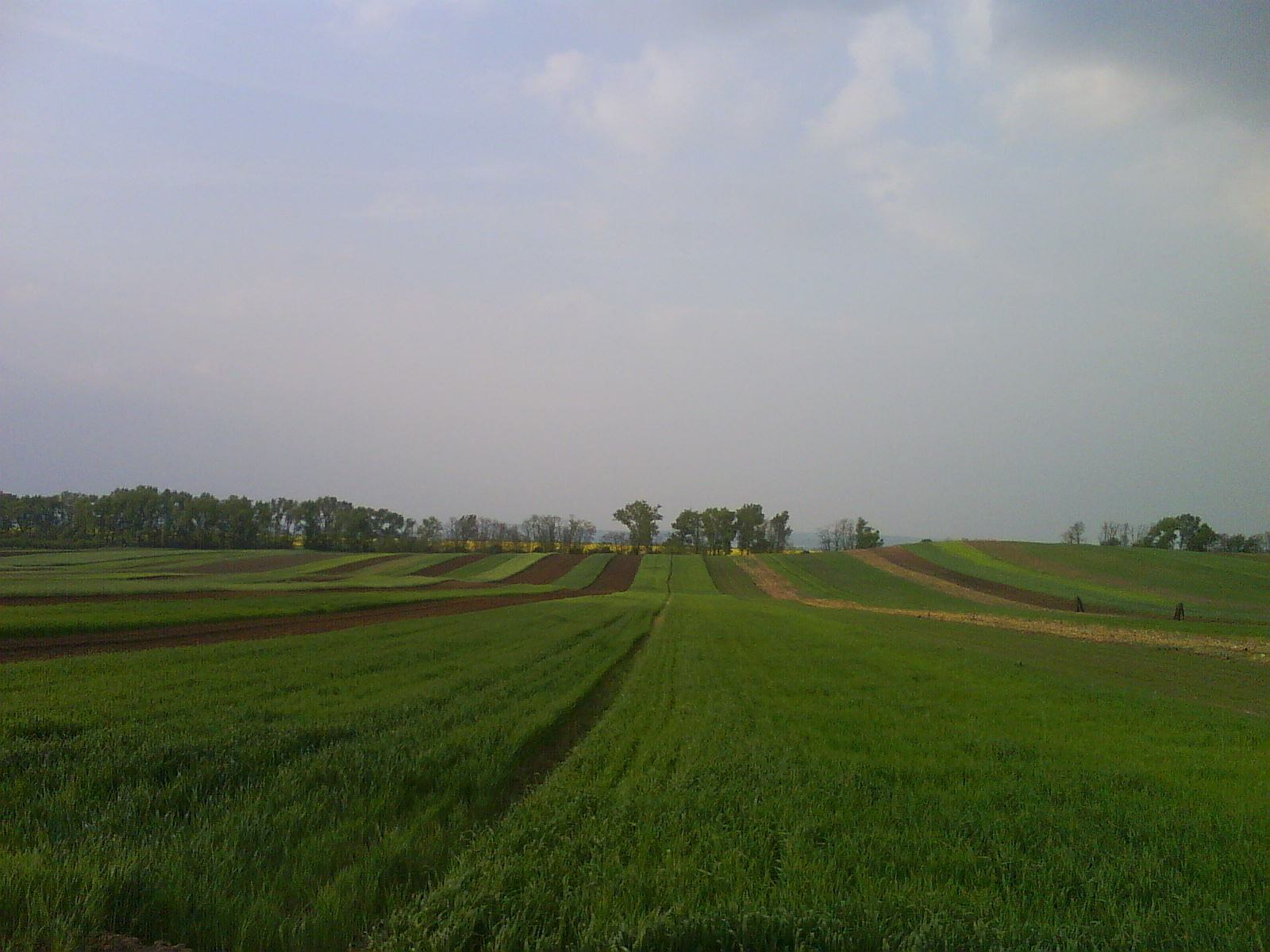
Landscape near Csomád

== See also ==
- List of cities and towns in Hungary
