= Zoltán Joó =

Hungarian contemporary painter

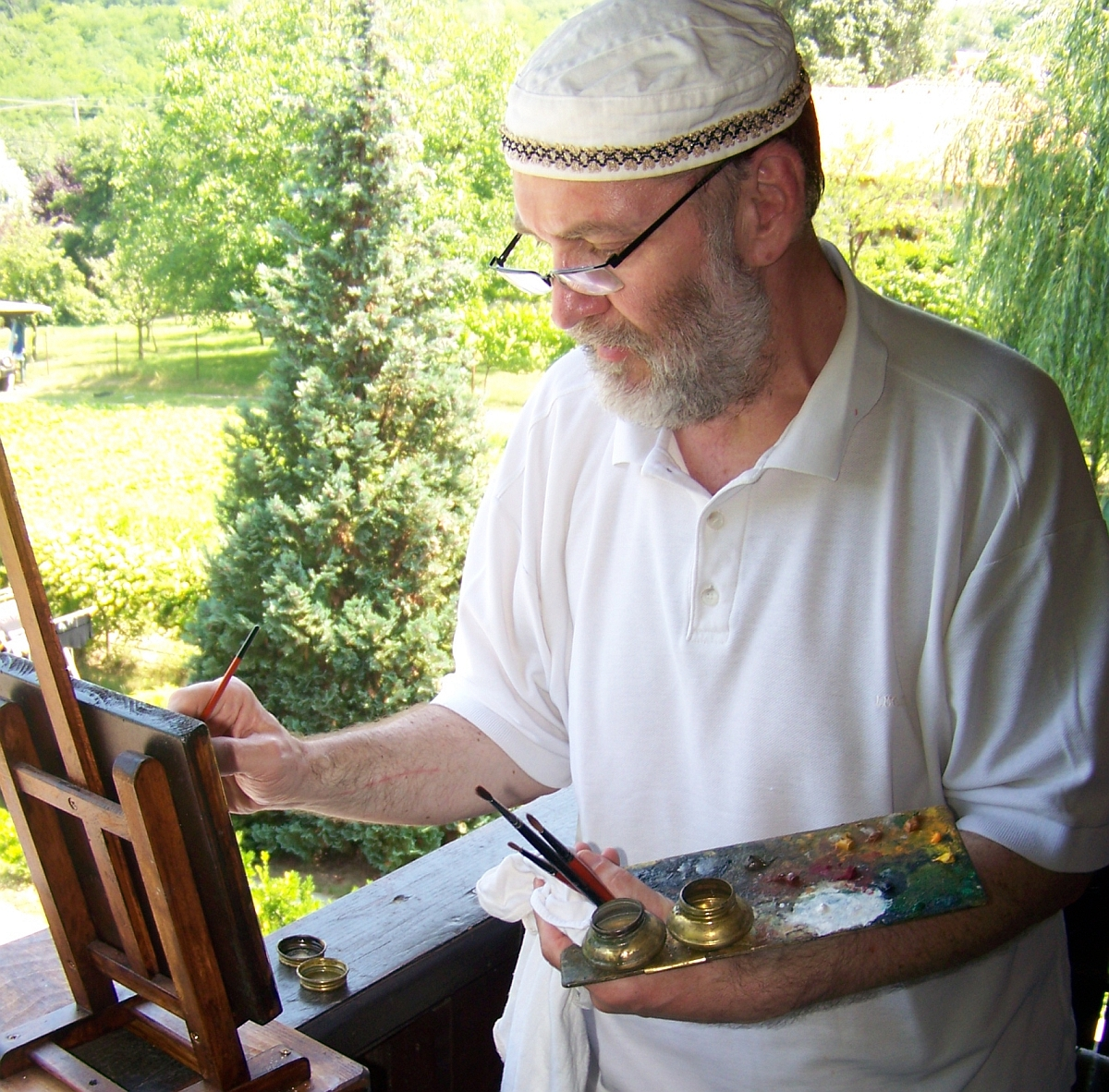
- Joó in 2013
- Born: December 17, 1956 (age 69); Budapest, Hungary
- Known for: Painter
- Notable work: Holy Spirit Church, painted coffered ceiling St Catherine Altar, painted coffered ceiling Hands and Faces series table-pictures about Old Testament, series St Stephan triptych
- Movement: Contemporary figurative
- Website: [www.porti.hu]

Zoltán Joó (17 December 1956) is a Hungarian painter of contemporary figurative fine art. He has worked in the religious art as an altar-painter, too. He likes to carve reliefs and sculptures. His interest artwork is the painted coffered ceiling that is reminds mood of the painted ceilings from the Middle Ages. He was the illustrator of two children’s books. To this contacts his realization of the animation-book. Nowadays he takes up the mural and decorative wall paintings.

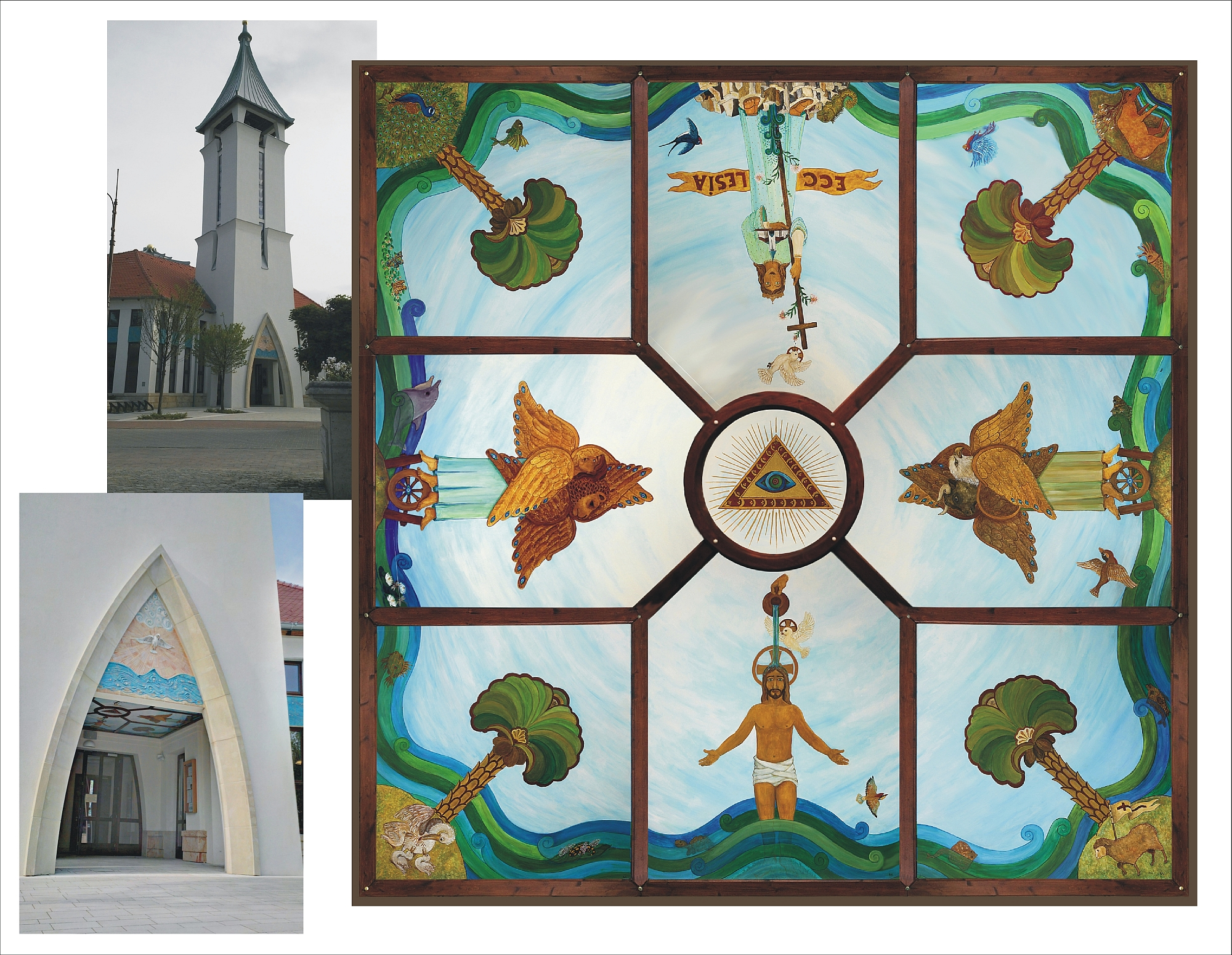
Holy Spirit Church (dedicated in 2016, Veresegyhaz, Hungary) and its main entrance where there is the painted, coffered ceiling made by Zoltán Joó

== Biography ==
Zoltán Joó was born in 1956 and has lived in Budapest and in a nearly small town, Veresegyház, Hungary. He comes from a non-artistic family, his father was legal adviser and his mother was international business broker. As a consequence of it, Zoltán educated to civil engineer. His engineering career began as work manager and ended as technical and economic deputy general manager. He turned round the painting due to his friend, Tamás Péli who had had a degree of Master at the Royal Netherlands Academy of Arts and Sciences. Zoltán learned the painting and the art in the old, traditional method: in atelier of his Master. He has tried his skill in various artworks: table pictures, oil paintings, sculptures, altar, painted coffered ceiling, reliefs, large decorative wall painting, illustrations of books with traditional paints and graphics, furthermore animated book with computer technique.

== Style ==
Zoltán Joó chooses painting in oil and acrylic. The atmosphere of his painted and carved artworks seems many times to remember the Romanesque style and Middle Ages with form and ironic interpretation.

== Books illustrated by Zoltán Joó ==
- Wass, Albert, ed. (2008), The Holy Hungarian Crown (First ed.), Kráter Mühely Egyesület, ISBN 978-963-9735-73-6
- Wass, Albert, ed. (2008), Tonuzoba, Kráter Mühely Egyesület, ISBN 978-963-9735-79-8

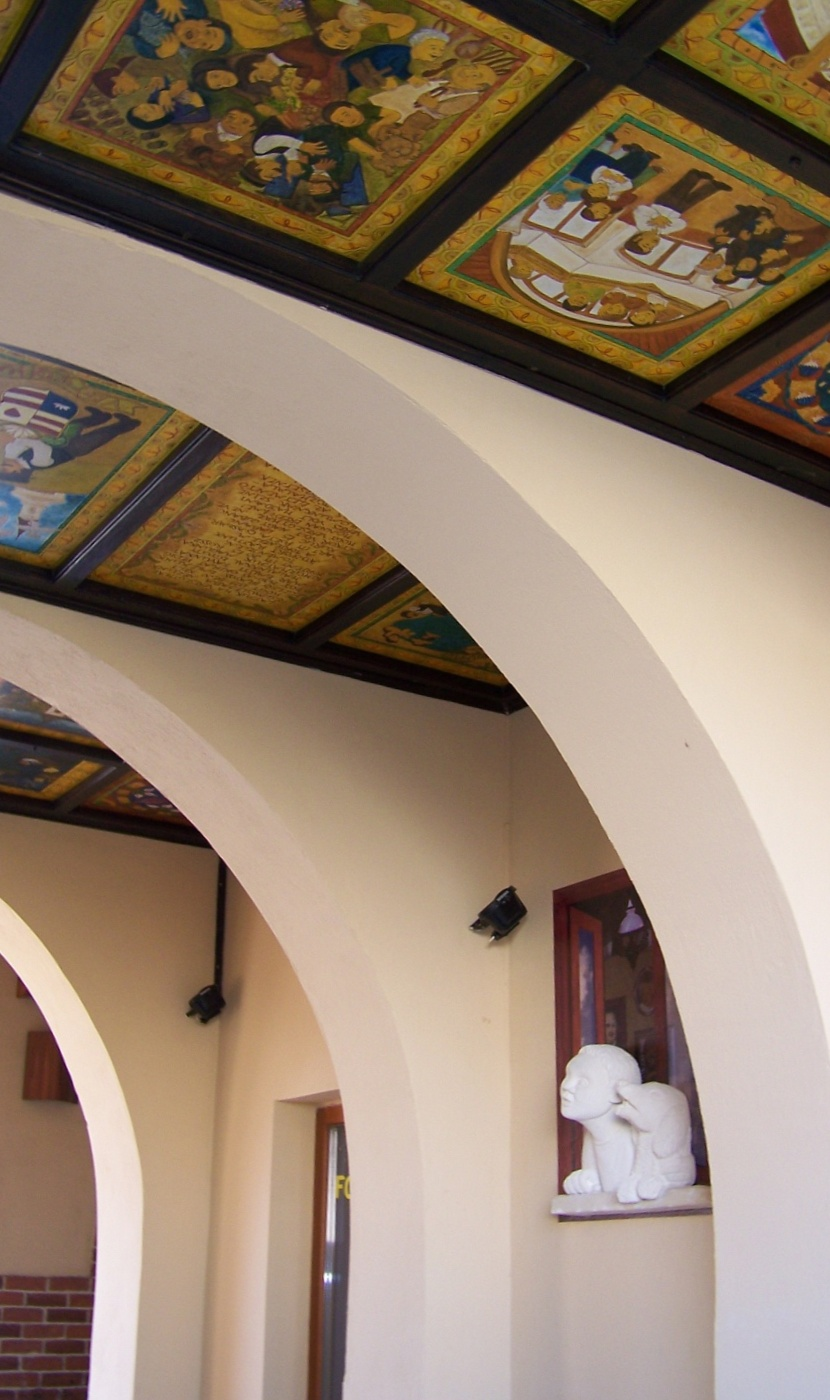
Zoltán Joó: Look up! Limestone sculpture and painted background (printed foil of the original painting)
