= Veresegyház =

Veresegyhaz
- Town
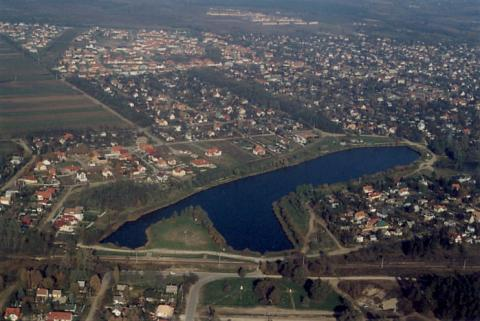
- Aerial view

- Flag Coat of arms

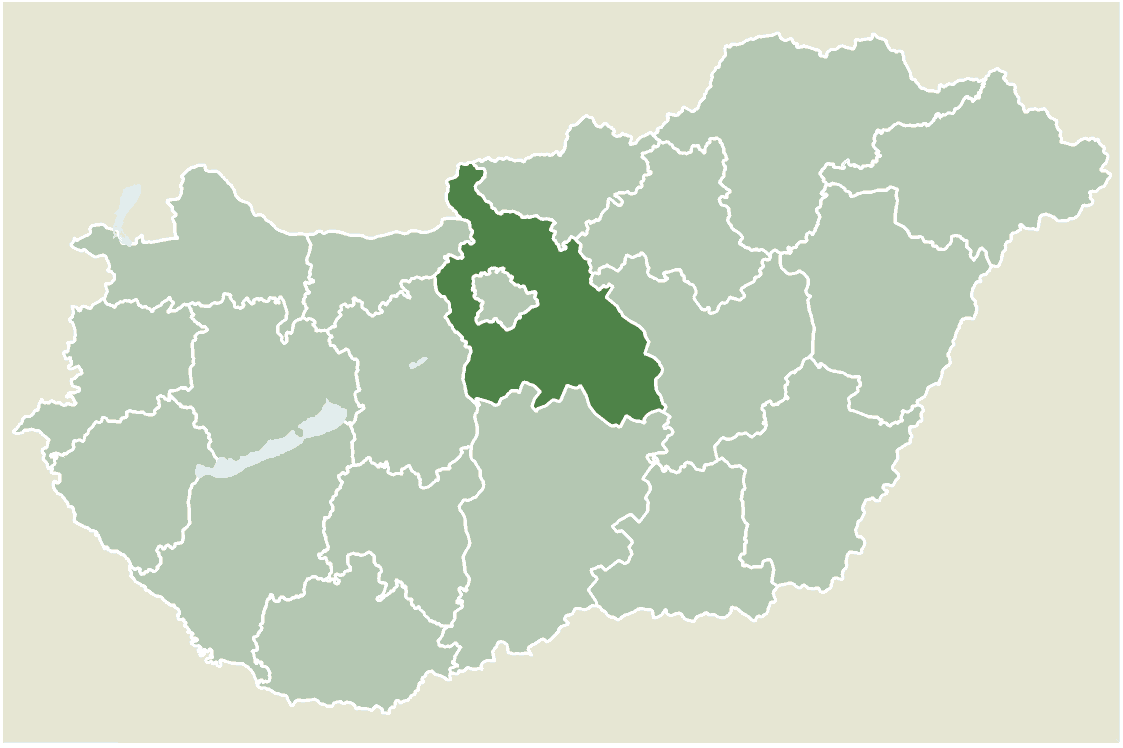
- Location of Pest county in Hungary

- Location of Veresegyház
- Coordinates: 47.65046°N 19.28299°E
- Country: Hungary
- County: Pest

Government
  - Mayor: Ferenc Cserháti (independent)

Area
  - Total: 28.56 km^{2} (11.03 sq mi)

Population (2024)
  - Total: 21,039 ▲
  - Density: 736.7/km^{2} (1,908/sq mi)
- Time zone: UTC+1 (CET)
  - Summer (DST): UTC+2 (CEST)
- Postal code: 2112
- Area code: 28

Veresegyház is a town in Gödöllő district, Pest county, Hungary.

== Location ==
This village first appeared as Vesereghatz in maps made by Hungarian clerk Lazarus Secretarius between 1510 and 1520. The town lies in the Gödöllő-Hills near Cserhát. The nearest neighbour is Szada.

It is directly bordered by Őrbottyán to the north, Erdőkertes and Vácegres to the northeast, Gödöllő and Szada to the southeast, Mogyoród to the southwest and Csomád to the west.

== Attractions ==
- Roman Catholic Church: Built in 1777 by Christoph Anton Migazzi in the style of Louis XVI.
- The parish buildings and monuments from the lake not far from the stone crosses, there are pedestals to Mary Magdalene and St. John the Evangelist.
- Roman Catholic cemetery: in 1806 and 1849 with red marble headstones
- Reformed Church: was built in 1786.
- Bear and wolf shelters: On November 24, 1998, Central Europe's only bear shelter was opened, covering 3.5 acres (1.4 ha). There are wolves in the park as well.

== Twin towns – sister cities ==
Veresegyház is twinned with:

- Atia (Corund), Romania
- Šahy, Slovakia
- Schneeberg, Germany

== Notable people ==
- Zoltán Bánföldi, footballer
- József Darányi, athlete
- Zoltán Joó, painter
- Zoltán Téglás, American-Hungarian singer, songwriter and producer
- István Sipeki, footballer
- Norbert Palásthy, footballer
- István Kövesfalvi, footballer
- Zoltán Bánföldi, footballer

== Resources ==
- Lajos Horváth: Veresegyház. Local history and village plans. Veresegyház, 1977. 251 p.
