= Ádám Madaras =

Hungarian modern pentathlete

Personal information
- Nickname: The Birdie
- Nationality: Hungarian
- Born: 28 December 1966 (age 59) Budapest, Hungary

Sport
- Country: Hungary
- Sport: Pentathlon
Medal record
Men's Modern pentathlon
Representing Hungary
World Championships
Gold medal – first place	1991 San Antonio	Team relay
Bronze medal – third place	1991 San Antonio	Individual
Bronze medal – third place	1991 San Antonio	Team
Gold medal – first place	1997 Sofia	Team
Bronze medal – third place	2000 Pesaro	Team relay
European Championships
Gold medal – first place	1991 Rome	Individual
Gold medal – first place	1991 Rome	Team
Gold medal – first place	1991 Rome	Team relay
Gold medal – first place	1993 Sofia	Team relay
Gold medal – first place	1997 Székesfehérvár	Team relay
Gold medal – first place	1999 Drzonków	Team

Ádám Madaras (born 28 December 1966) is a Hungarian World and European champion modern pentathlete, fencer, actor, stuntman, media entrepreneur. He participated on the Hungarian team which won a gold medal at the 1991 World Modern Pentathlon Championships in San Antonio. Ádám Madaras also won the Hungarian National Championships in the épée fencing event in 1990. He is 9-time Hungarian champion in modern pentathlon.

== Awards ==
Madaras was elected Hungarian Pentathlete of the Year in 1991.

== Filmography ==
- A Hídember (2002) as the adjutant of Karl Clam-Martinitz
