= Csömör =

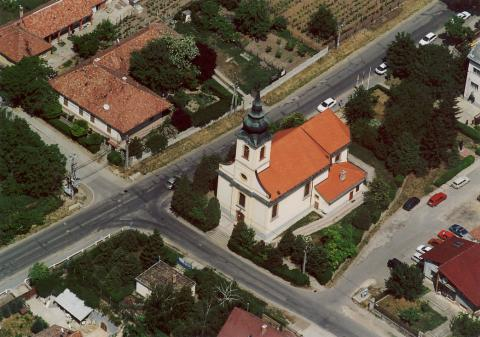
- Aerial view with the Roman-Catholic church

- Flag Coat of arms

- Location of Csömör in Hungary
- Coordinates: 47.54685°N 19.22451°E
- Country: Hungary
- County: Pest
- Districts: Gödöllő District

Government
  - Mayor: Fábri István

Area
  - Total: 22.67 km^{2} (8.75 sq mi)

Population (10th of January 2022)
  - Total: 10,580
  - Density: 466.7/km^{2} (1,209/sq mi)
- Time zone: UTC+1 (CET)
  - Summer (DST): UTC+2 (CEST)
- Postal code: 2141
- Area code: +36 28
- KSH code: 22804
- Website: www.csomor.hu

Csömör (Hungarian: [ˈt͡ʃømør]) is a village in the Gödöllő District in Pest county, Hungary. It lies in the Budapest metropolitan area, north of the 16th district of Budapest and west of Kistarcsa, on the western part of the Gödöllő hills, in the turning of the Csömör stream. It has a population of 10,580 (2022).

== History ==
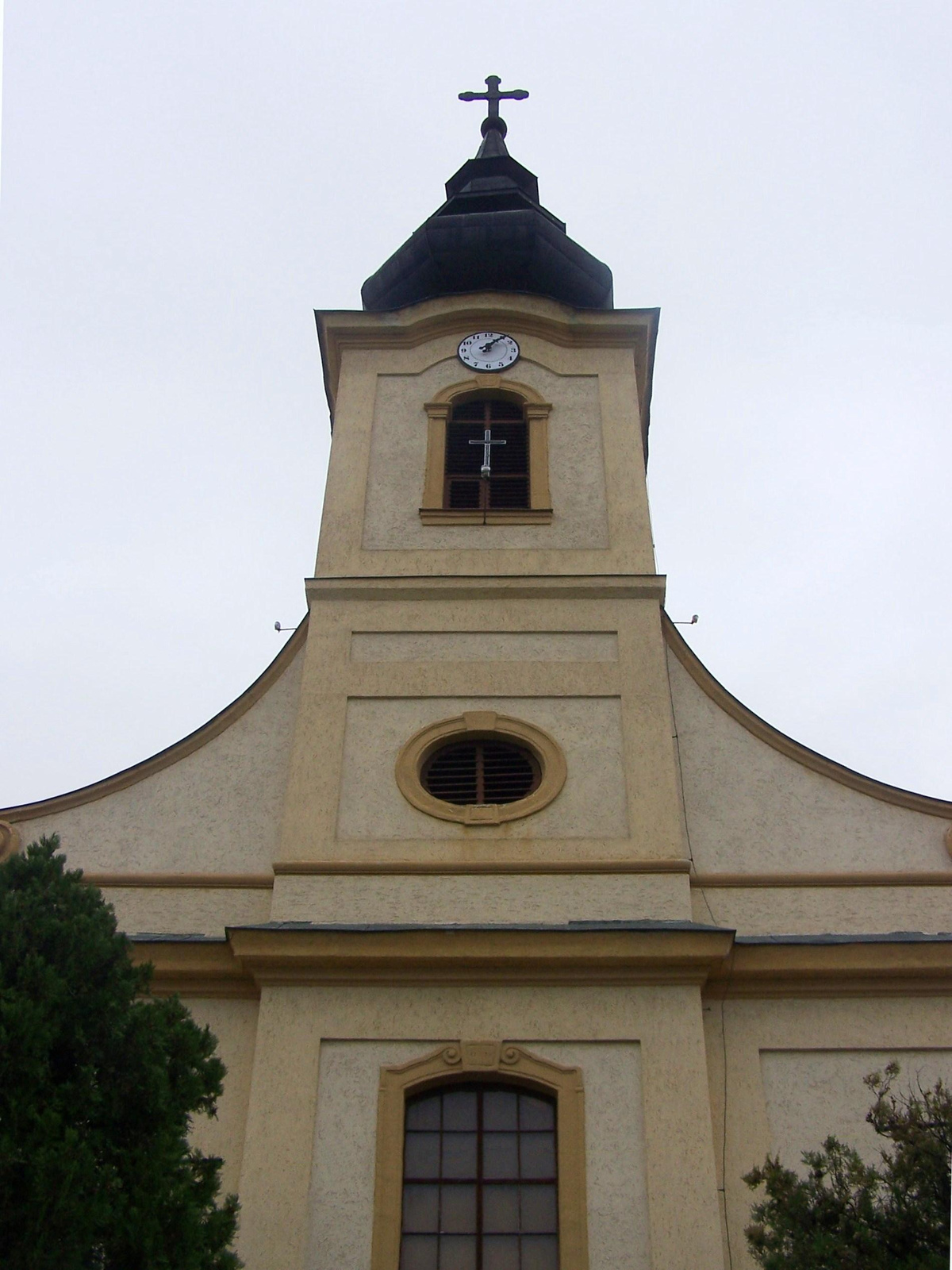
Front facade of the Holy Trinity Church

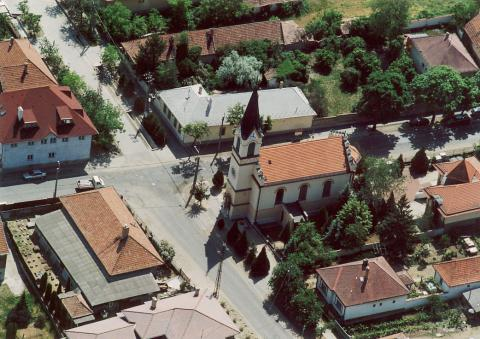
Aerial view of the Lutheran church

Ceramic pieces were found from the New Stone Age (3200–3000 BC) in the area of the Urasági-tag, the Bab-földek (bean fields) and the Rét-pótlék.

Ceramic pieces were found from the Bronze Age (1900–1800 BC) on the area of the Urasági-tag and the Szeder-völgyi-dűlő. On the 64 Erzsébet Street were found troves from the Vatyai Culture (1700–1400 BC).

A Celtic cemetery was dug out behind the strand, which is from the Iron Age (380–300 BC). Between the troves there are bracelets, fibulas, chiffons, a scabbard with sword, and chain.

During the third and the fourth century there was a Sarmatian village on the area of Csömör, both sides of the stream. During the explorations a Roman bowl (from the third century) and pottery were found.

Pieces of bowl were found on the area of the Réti-dűlős and Rétpótlék from the Avar age.

Ceramic pieces were found on the area of the Káposztáss and Réti-dűlős, that were made during the tenth and the eleventh century.

== Memorial of communism's victims ==
In 2006, the Gloria Victis Memorial was created in honor of the casualties of universal communism: it is situated adjacent to the cemetery of the town.

== Twin towns – sister cities ==
Csömör is twinned with:

- Mojmírovce, Slovakia
- Rimetea, Romania

== Demographics ==
Csömör has historically maintained a low population due to its rural origins and limited urbanization. With a current population of approximately 10,000, Csömör's modest size is tied to its agricultural past and relatively small economic base, which has made it less attractive for younger generations seeking career opportunities in larger cities.

The ageing population trend in Csömör can be attributed to younger residents moving to Budapest or other urban centers for education and work, leaving behind an older demographic. Additionally, a lower birth rate, common in many European towns, further accelerates this demographic shift. Despite its peaceful environment and proximity to the capital, Csömör’s lack of significant industrial or technological development has prevented substantial population growth over the years.

Year	Population
1980	5,516
1990	5,487
2001	7,226
2011	9,293
2020	9,971
2022	10,580
