= Csomád =

Csomád Čomad (in Slovak)
- Village
- Flag Coat of arms

- Location of Csomád
- Coordinates: 47.65388°N 19.23655°E
- Country: Hungary
- Region: Central Hungary
- County: Pest
- District: Dunakeszi

Area
  - Total: 12.38 km^{2} (4.78 sq mi)

Population (1 January 2025)
  - Total: 1,851
  - Density: 149.5/km^{2} (387.2/sq mi)
- Time zone: UTC+1 (CET)
  - Summer (DST): UTC+2 (CEST)
- Postal code: 2161
- Area code: (+36) 28
- Website: www.csomad.hu

Csomád is a village in Pest county, Budapest metropolitan area, Hungary. It has a population of 1,193 (2007).
