= Erdőkertes =

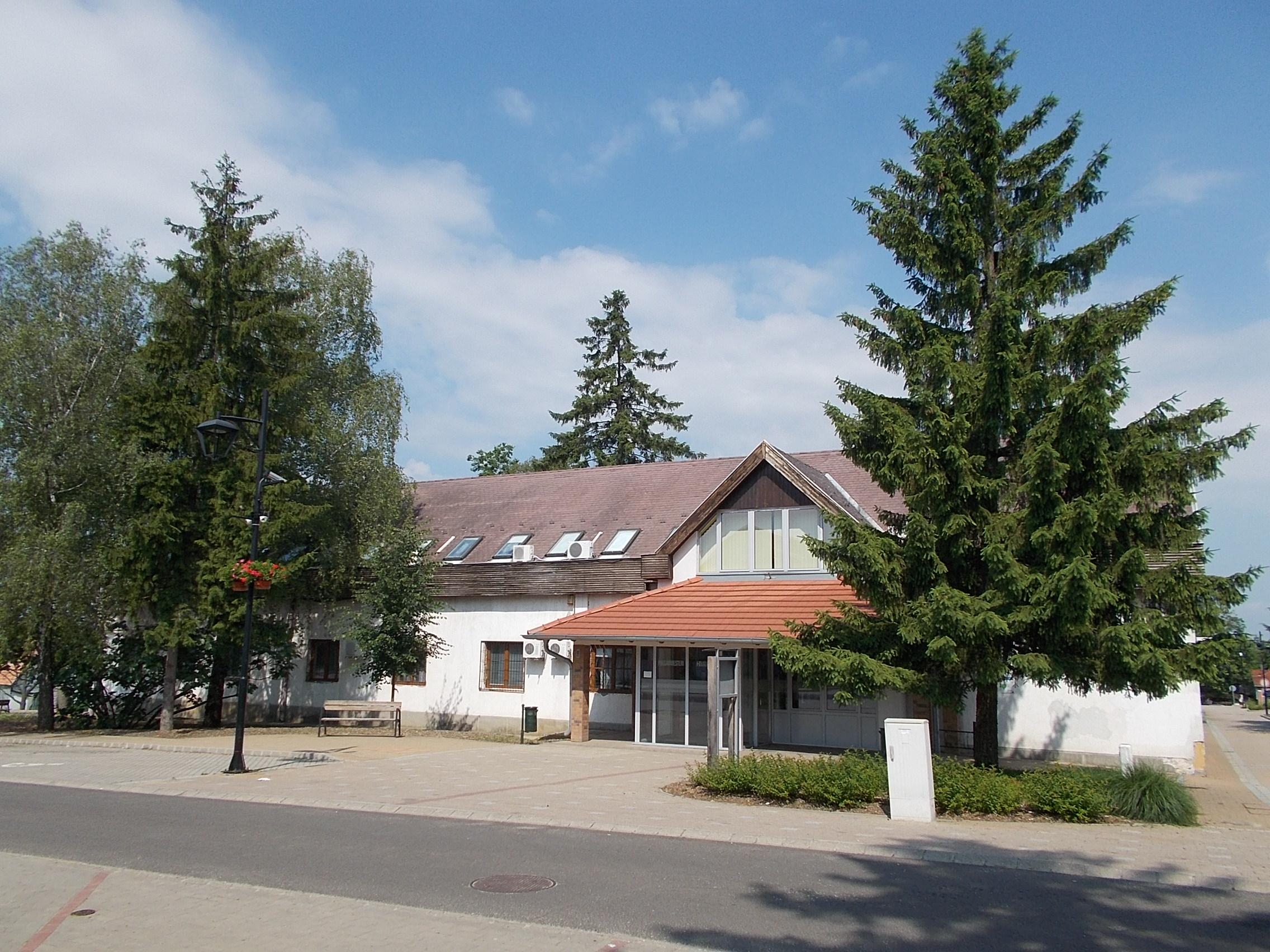
- Village hall

- Coat of arms

- Location of Erdőkertes in Hungary
- Coordinates: 47°40′29.68″N 19°18′56.99″E
- Country: Hungary
- Region: Central Hungary
- County: Pest
- Subregion: Veresegyházi
- Rank: Village

Area
  - Total: 5.74 km^{2} (2.22 sq mi)
- Time zone: UTC+1 (CET)
  - Summer (DST): UTC+2 (CEST)
- Postal code: 2113
- Area code: +36 28
- Website: https://erdokertes.hu/

Erdőkertes is a village in Pest county, Budapest metropolitan area, Hungary. It has a population of 8,248 (2017). Its name means "Forest Garden" in English. It is considered to be an up-and-coming property hotspot as it is located within a 30-minute commute to the centre of Budapest. The village has a full range of amenities including a local train station, a park, supermarkets and several schools.
