= Amador, California =

Amador may refer to:

- Amador City, California, a small city in the Sierra Nevada
- Amador County, California, the surrounding county
- Dublin, California, formerly called Amador
