= List of municipalities in California =

Map of the United States with California highlighted

A map of counties and municipality boundaries in California

California is a state located in the Western United States. It is the most populous state and the third largest by area after Alaska and Texas. According to the 2020 United States Census, California has 39,538,223 inhabitants and 155,779.22 square miles (403,466.3 km^{2}) of land.

California has been inhabited by numerous Native American peoples for thousands of years. The Spanish, the Russians, and other Europeans began exploring and colonizing the area in the 16th and 17th centuries, with the Spanish establishing its first California mission at what is now San Diego in 1769. After the Mexican Cession of 1848, the California Gold Rush brought worldwide attention to the area. The growth of the movie industry in Los Angeles, high tech in San Francisco and Silicon Valley, tourism, agriculture, and other areas in the ensuing decades fueled the creation of a $3 trillion economy as of 2018, which would rank fifth in the world if the state were a sovereign nation.

California is divided into 58 counties and contains 483 municipalities. One, San Francisco, is a consolidated city-county. California law makes no distinction between "city" and "town", and municipalities may use either term in their official names. They can be organized as either a charter municipality, governed by its own charter, or a general-law municipality (or "code city"), governed by state statute.

The first municipality to incorporate was Sacramento on February 27, 1850, while the most recent was Mountain House on July 1, 2024. Eight cities were incorporated before the state's September 9, 1850, admission to the Union. According to the 2020 United States Census, the largest municipality by population and land area is Los Angeles with 3,898,747 residents and 469.49 square miles (1,216.0 km^{2}). Amador City is the smallest municipality by population with 200 people and the smallest by land area at 0.31 square miles (0.80 km^{2}).

== Municipalities ==
Most populous municipalities in California

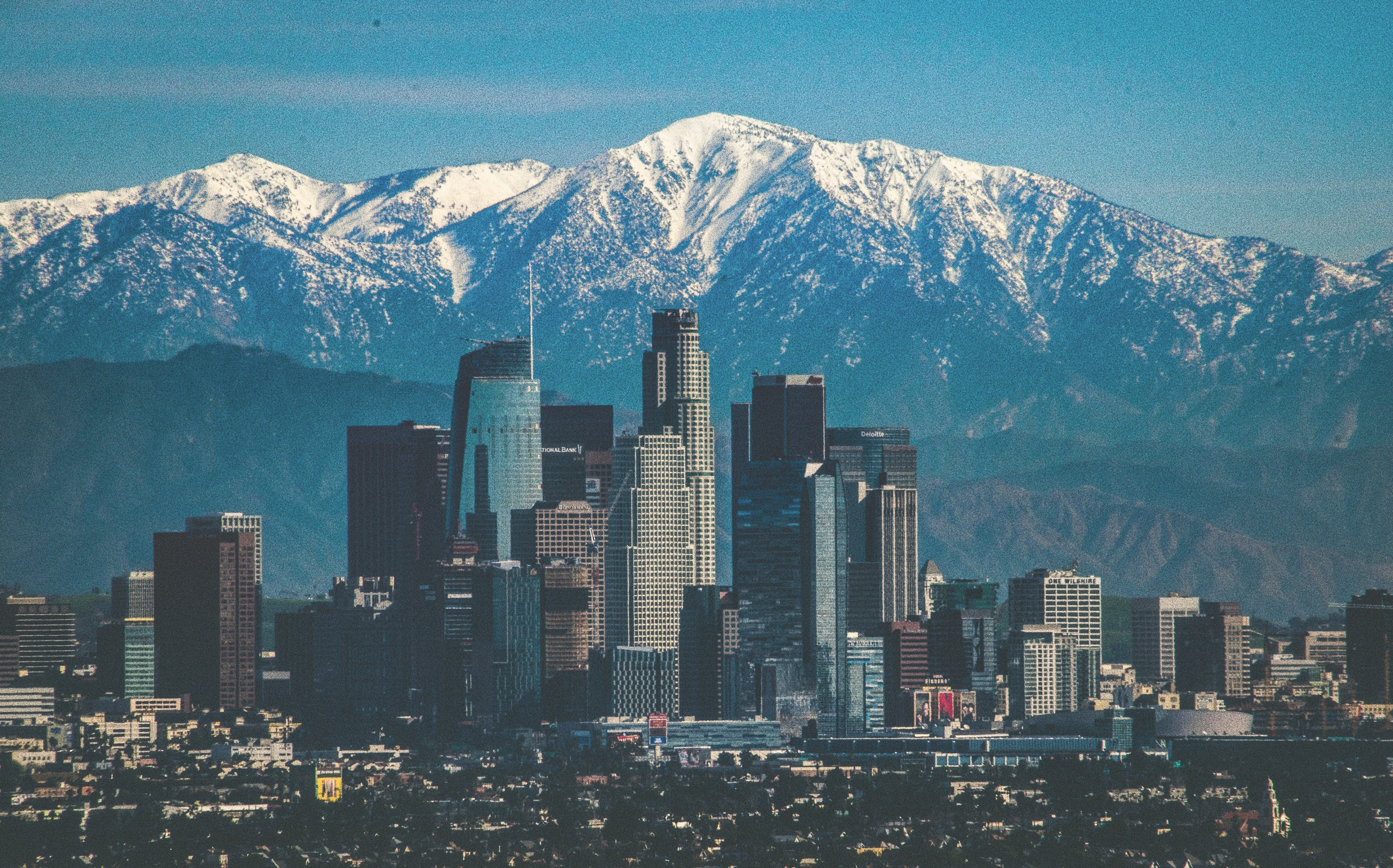
Los Angeles, the most populous city in California

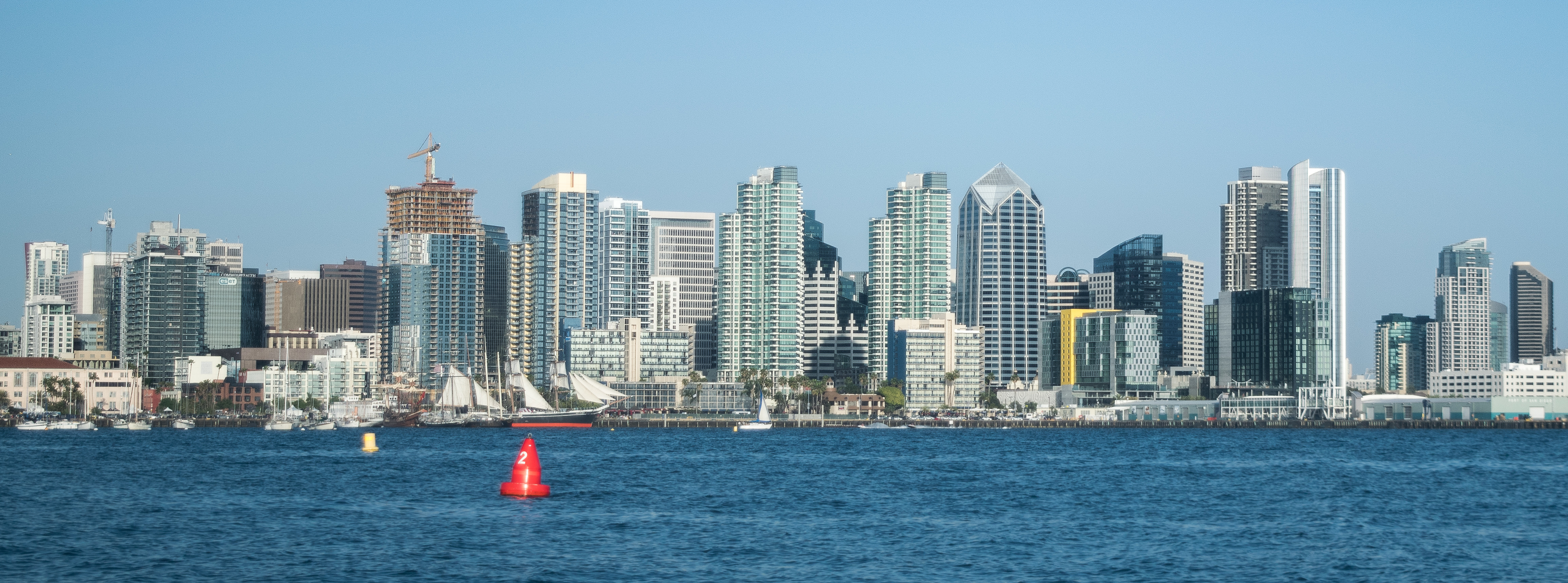
San Diego, the second most populous city in California

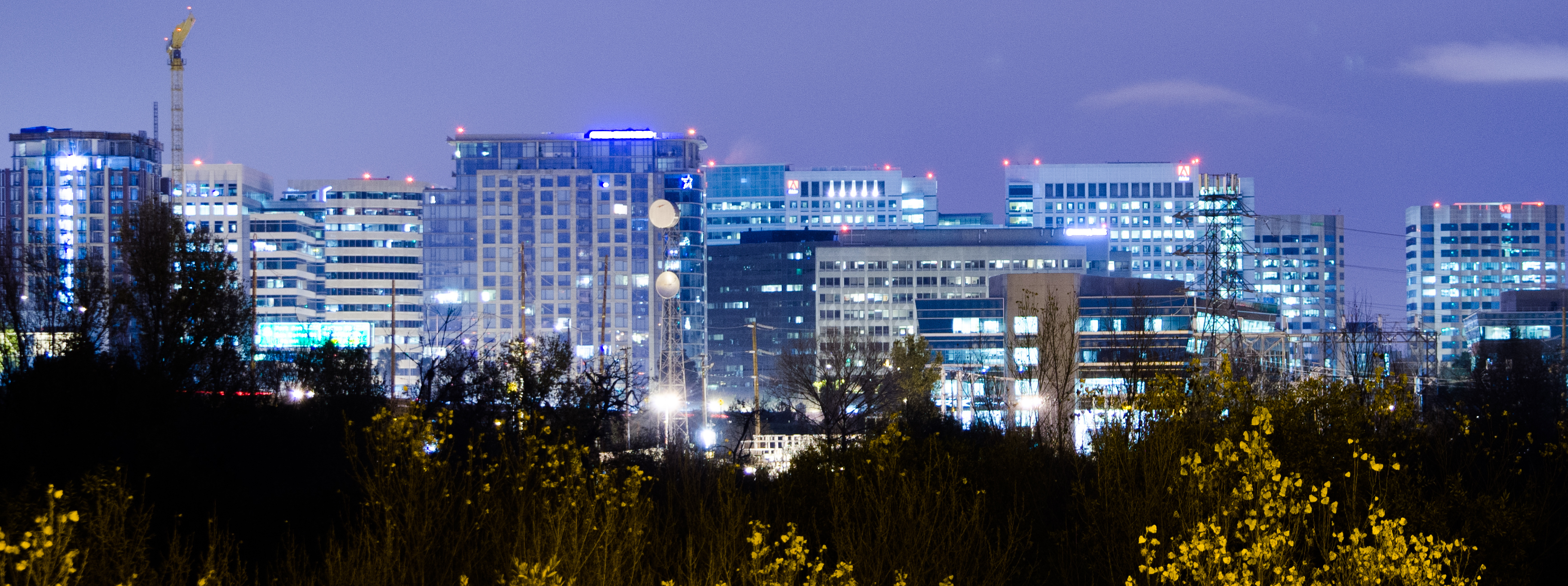
San Jose, the third most populous city in California

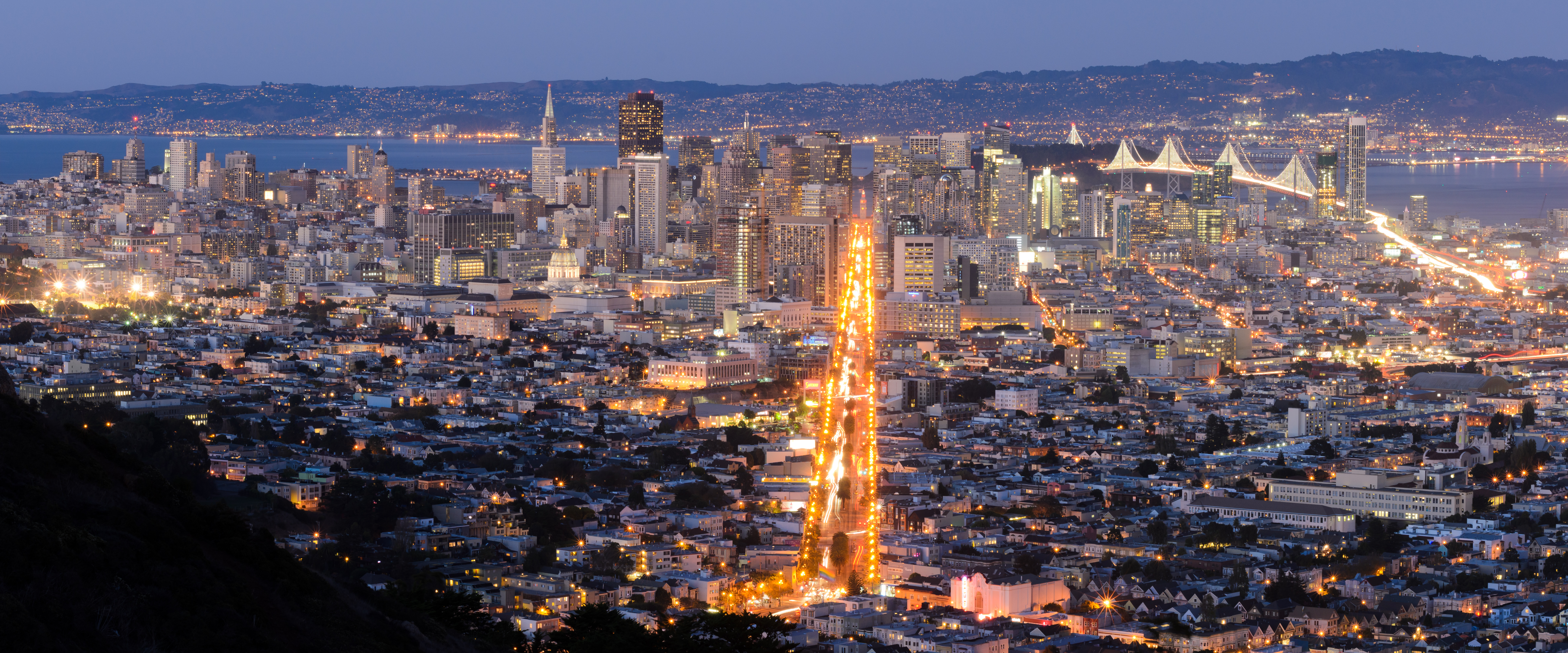
San Francisco, the fourth most populous city in California

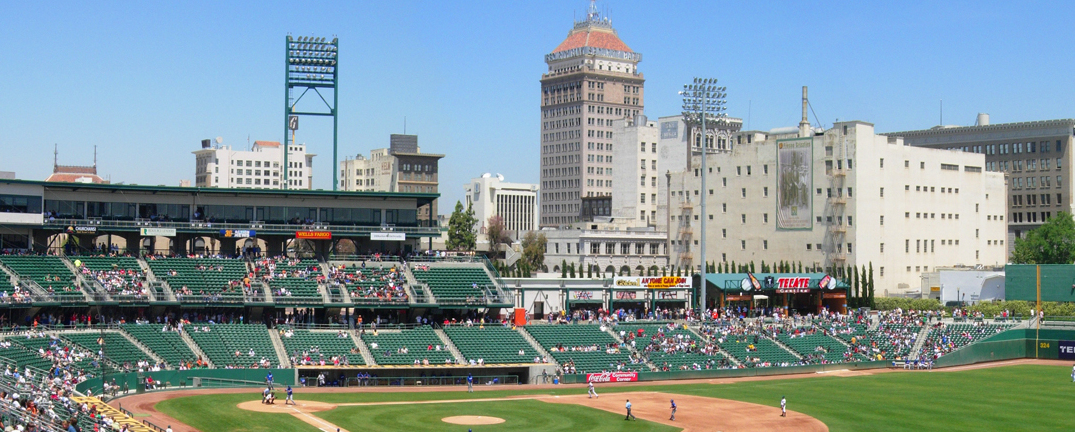
Fresno, the fifth most populous city in California

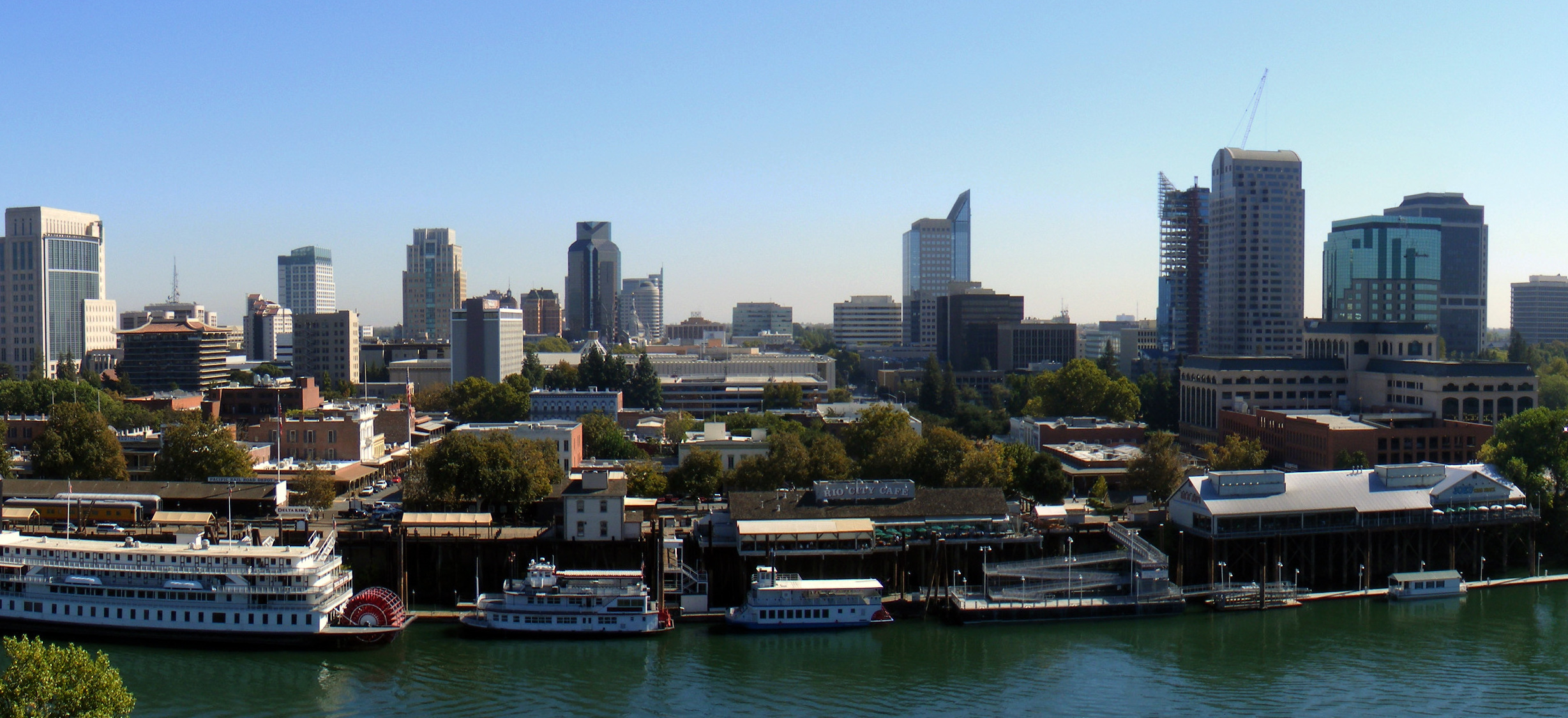
Sacramento, California's sixth most populous city and state capital

†	County seat
‡	State capital and county seat

Name	Type	County	Population (2020)	Population (2010)	Change	Land area	Population density	Incorporated
Adelanto	City	San Bernardino	38,046	31,765	+19.8%	52.87 sq mi (136.9 km^{2})	719.6/sq mi (277.8/km^{2})	December 22, 1970
Agoura Hills	City	Los Angeles	20,299	20,330	−0.2%	7.80 sq mi (20.2 km^{2})	2,602.4/sq mi (1,004.8/km^{2})	December 8, 1982
Alameda	City	Alameda	78,280	73,812	+6.1%	10.45 sq mi (27.1 km^{2})	7,490.9/sq mi (2,892.3/km^{2})	April 19, 1854
Albany	City	Alameda	20,271	18,539	+9.3%	1.79 sq mi (4.6 km^{2})	11,324.6/sq mi (4,372.4/km^{2})	September 22, 1908
Alhambra	City	Los Angeles	82,868	83,089	−0.3%	7.63 sq mi (19.8 km^{2})	10,860.8/sq mi (4,193.4/km^{2})	July 11, 1903
Aliso Viejo	City	Orange	52,176	47,823	+9.1%	6.93 sq mi (17.9 km^{2})	7,529.0/sq mi (2,907.0/km^{2})	July 1, 2001
Alturas†	City	Modoc	2,715	2,827	−4.0%	2.84 sq mi (7.4 km^{2})	956.0/sq mi (369.1/km^{2})	September 16, 1901
Amador City	City	Amador	200	185	+8.1%	0.31 sq mi (0.80 km^{2})	645.2/sq mi (249.1/km^{2})	June 2, 1915
American Canyon	City	Napa	21,837	19,454	+12.2%	6.09 sq mi (15.8 km^{2})	3,585.7/sq mi (1,384.5/km^{2})	January 1, 1992
Anaheim	City	Orange	346,824	336,265	+3.1%	50.27 sq mi (130.2 km^{2})	6,899.2/sq mi (2,663.8/km^{2})	March 18, 1876
Anderson	City	Shasta	11,323	9,932	+14.0%	7.03 sq mi (18.2 km^{2})	1,610.7/sq mi (621.9/km^{2})	January 16, 1956
Angels Camp	City	Calaveras	3,667	3,836	−4.4%	3.63 sq mi (9.4 km^{2})	1,010.2/sq mi (390.0/km^{2})	January 16, 1912
Antioch	City	Contra Costa	115,291	102,372	+12.6%	29.17 sq mi (75.5 km^{2})	3,952.4/sq mi (1,526.0/km^{2})	February 6, 1872
Apple Valley	Town	San Bernardino	75,791	69,135	+9.6%	77.01 sq mi (199.5 km^{2})	984.2/sq mi (380.0/km^{2})	November 28, 1988
Arcadia	City	Los Angeles	56,681	56,364	+0.6%	10.93 sq mi (28.3 km^{2})	5,185.8/sq mi (2,002.3/km^{2})	August 5, 1903
Arcata	City	Humboldt	18,857	17,231	+9.4%	9.42 sq mi (24.4 km^{2})	2,001.8/sq mi (772.9/km^{2})	February 2, 1858
Arroyo Grande	City	San Luis Obispo	18,441	17,252	+6.9%	5.94 sq mi (15.4 km^{2})	3,104.5/sq mi (1,198.7/km^{2})	July 10, 1911
Artesia	City	Los Angeles	16,395	16,522	−0.8%	1.62 sq mi (4.2 km^{2})	10,120.4/sq mi (3,907.5/km^{2})	May 29, 1959
Arvin	City	Kern	19,495	19,304	+1.0%	4.82 sq mi (12.5 km^{2})	4,044.6/sq mi (1,561.6/km^{2})	December 21, 1960
Atascadero	City	San Luis Obispo	29,773	28,310	+5.2%	26.07 sq mi (67.5 km^{2})	1,142.0/sq mi (440.9/km^{2})	July 2, 1979
Atherton	Town	San Mateo	7,188	6,914	+4.0%	5.02 sq mi (13.0 km^{2})	1,431.9/sq mi (552.8/km^{2})	September 12, 1923
Atwater	City	Merced	31,970	28,168	+13.5%	6.57 sq mi (17.0 km^{2})	4,866.1/sq mi (1,878.8/km^{2})	August 16, 1922
Auburn†	City	Placer	13,776	13,330	+3.3%	7.18 sq mi (18.6 km^{2})	1,918.7/sq mi (740.8/km^{2})	May 2, 1888
Avalon	City	Los Angeles	3,460	3,728	−7.2%	2.89 sq mi (7.5 km^{2})	1,197.2/sq mi (462.3/km^{2})	June 26, 1913
Avenal	City	Kings	13,696	15,505	−11.7%	19.48 sq mi (50.5 km^{2})	703.1/sq mi (271.5/km^{2})	September 11, 1979
Azusa	City	Los Angeles	50,000	46,361	+7.8%	9.66 sq mi (25.0 km^{2})	5,176.0/sq mi (1,998.5/km^{2})	December 29, 1898
Bakersfield†	City	Kern	403,455	347,483	+16.1%	149.78 sq mi (387.9 km^{2})	2,693.7/sq mi (1,040.0/km^{2})	January 11, 1898
Baldwin Park	City	Los Angeles	72,176	75,390	−4.3%	6.63 sq mi (17.2 km^{2})	10,886.3/sq mi (4,203.2/km^{2})	January 25, 1956
Banning	City	Riverside	29,505	29,603	−0.3%	23.24 sq mi (60.2 km^{2})	1,269.6/sq mi (490.2/km^{2})	February 6, 1913
Barstow	City	San Bernardino	25,415	22,639	+12.3%	41.30 sq mi (107.0 km^{2})	615.4/sq mi (237.6/km^{2})	September 30, 1947
Beaumont	City	Riverside	53,036	36,877	+43.8%	30.32 sq mi (78.5 km^{2})	1,749.2/sq mi (675.4/km^{2})	November 18, 1912
Bell	City	Los Angeles	33,559	35,477	−5.4%	2.51 sq mi (6.5 km^{2})	13,370.1/sq mi (5,162.2/km^{2})	November 7, 1927
Bell Gardens	City	Los Angeles	39,501	42,072	−6.1%	2.46 sq mi (6.4 km^{2})	16,057.3/sq mi (6,199.8/km^{2})	August 1, 1961
Bellflower	City	Los Angeles	79,190	76,616	+3.4%	6.12 sq mi (15.9 km^{2})	12,939.5/sq mi (4,996.0/km^{2})	September 3, 1957
Belmont	City	San Mateo	28,335	25,835	+9.7%	4.63 sq mi (12.0 km^{2})	6,119.9/sq mi (2,362.9/km^{2})	October 29, 1926
Belvedere	City	Marin	2,126	2,068	+2.8%	0.52 sq mi (1.3 km^{2})	4,088.5/sq mi (1,578.6/km^{2})	December 24, 1896
Benicia	City	Solano	27,131	26,997	+0.5%	12.81 sq mi (33.2 km^{2})	2,118.0/sq mi (817.7/km^{2})	March 27, 1850
Berkeley	City	Alameda	124,321	112,580	+10.4%	10.43 sq mi (27.0 km^{2})	11,919.6/sq mi (4,602.2/km^{2})	April 4, 1878
Beverly Hills	City	Los Angeles	32,701	34,109	−4.1%	5.71 sq mi (14.8 km^{2})	5,727.0/sq mi (2,211.2/km^{2})	January 28, 1914
Big Bear Lake	City	San Bernardino	5,046	5,019	+0.5%	6.24 sq mi (16.2 km^{2})	808.7/sq mi (312.2/km^{2})	November 28, 1980
Biggs	City	Butte	1,964	1,707	+15.1%	0.90 sq mi (2.3 km^{2})	2,182.2/sq mi (842.6/km^{2})	June 26, 1903
Bishop	City	Inyo	3,819	3,879	−1.5%	1.86 sq mi (4.8 km^{2})	2,053.2/sq mi (792.8/km^{2})	May 6, 1903
Blue Lake	City	Humboldt	1,208	1,253	−3.6%	0.59 sq mi (1.5 km^{2})	2,047.5/sq mi (790.5/km^{2})	April 23, 1910
Blythe	City	Riverside	18,317	20,817	−12.0%	26.58 sq mi (68.8 km^{2})	689.1/sq mi (266.1/km^{2})	July 21, 1916
Bradbury	City	Los Angeles	921	1,048	−12.1%	1.96 sq mi (5.1 km^{2})	469.9/sq mi (181.4/km^{2})	July 26, 1957
Brawley	City	Imperial	26,416	24,953	+5.9%	8.12 sq mi (21.0 km^{2})	3,253.2/sq mi (1,256.1/km^{2})	April 6, 1908
Brea	City	Orange	47,325	39,282	+20.5%	12.17 sq mi (31.5 km^{2})	3,888.7/sq mi (1,501.4/km^{2})	February 23, 1917
Brentwood	City	Contra Costa	64,292	51,481	+24.9%	14.87 sq mi (38.5 km^{2})	4,323.6/sq mi (1,669.4/km^{2})	January 21, 1948
Brisbane	City	San Mateo	4,851	4,282	+13.3%	2.99 sq mi (7.7 km^{2})	1,622.4/sq mi (626.4/km^{2})	November 27, 1961
Buellton	City	Santa Barbara	5,161	4,828	+6.9%	1.58 sq mi (4.1 km^{2})	3,266.5/sq mi (1,261.2/km^{2})	February 1, 1992
Buena Park	City	Orange	84,034	80,530	+4.4%	10.53 sq mi (27.3 km^{2})	7,980.4/sq mi (3,081.3/km^{2})	January 27, 1953
Burbank	City	Los Angeles	107,337	103,340	+3.9%	17.32 sq mi (44.9 km^{2})	6,197.3/sq mi (2,392.8/km^{2})	July 8, 1911
Burlingame	City	San Mateo	31,386	28,806	+9.0%	4.39 sq mi (11.4 km^{2})	7,149.4/sq mi (2,760.4/km^{2})	June 6, 1908
Calabasas	City	Los Angeles	23,241	23,058	+0.8%	13.71 sq mi (35.5 km^{2})	1,695.2/sq mi (654.5/km^{2})	April 5, 1991
Calexico	City	Imperial	38,633	38,572	+0.2%	8.62 sq mi (22.3 km^{2})	4,481.8/sq mi (1,730.4/km^{2})	April 16, 1908
California City	City	Kern	14,973	14,120	+6.0%	203.61 sq mi (527.3 km^{2})	73.5/sq mi (28.4/km^{2})	December 10, 1965
Calimesa	City	Riverside	10,026	7,879	+27.2%	14.86 sq mi (38.5 km^{2})	674.7/sq mi (260.5/km^{2})	December 1, 1990
Calipatria	City	Imperial	6,515	7,705	−15.4%	3.70 sq mi (9.6 km^{2})	1,760.8/sq mi (679.9/km^{2})	February 28, 1919
Calistoga	City	Napa	5,228	5,155	+1.4%	2.58 sq mi (6.7 km^{2})	2,026.4/sq mi (782.4/km^{2})	January 6, 1886
Camarillo	City	Ventura	70,741	65,201	+8.5%	19.69 sq mi (51.0 km^{2})	3,592.7/sq mi (1,387.2/km^{2})	March 28, 1964
Campbell	City	Santa Clara	43,959	39,349	+11.7%	6.08 sq mi (15.7 km^{2})	7,230.1/sq mi (2,791.6/km^{2})	March 28, 1952
Canyon Lake	City	Riverside	11,082	10,561	+4.9%	3.92 sq mi (10.2 km^{2})	2,827.0/sq mi (1,091.5/km^{2})	December 1, 1990
Capitola	City	Santa Cruz	9,938	9,918	+0.2%	1.59 sq mi (4.1 km^{2})	6,250.3/sq mi (2,413.3/km^{2})	January 11, 1949
Carlsbad	City	San Diego	114,746	105,328	+8.9%	37.77 sq mi (97.8 km^{2})	3,038.0/sq mi (1,173.0/km^{2})	July 16, 1952
Carmel-by-the-Sea	City	Monterey	3,220	3,722	−13.5%	1.06 sq mi (2.7 km^{2})	3,037.7/sq mi (1,172.9/km^{2})	October 31, 1916
Carpinteria	City	Santa Barbara	13,264	13,040	+1.7%	2.59 sq mi (6.7 km^{2})	5,121.2/sq mi (1,977.3/km^{2})	September 28, 1965
Carson	City	Los Angeles	95,558	91,714	+4.2%	18.73 sq mi (48.5 km^{2})	5,101.9/sq mi (1,969.8/km^{2})	February 20, 1968
Cathedral City	City	Riverside	51,493	51,200	+0.6%	22.49 sq mi (58.2 km^{2})	2,289.6/sq mi (884.0/km^{2})	November 16, 1981
Ceres	City	Stanislaus	49,302	45,417	+8.6%	9.50 sq mi (24.6 km^{2})	5,189.7/sq mi (2,003.7/km^{2})	February 25, 1918
Cerritos	City	Los Angeles	49,578	49,041	+1.1%	8.73 sq mi (22.6 km^{2})	5,679.0/sq mi (2,192.7/km^{2})	April 24, 1956
Chico	City	Butte	101,475	86,187	+17.7%	34.14 sq mi (88.4 km^{2})	2,972.3/sq mi (1,147.6/km^{2})	January 8, 1872
Chino	City	San Bernardino	91,403	77,983	+17.2%	29.61 sq mi (76.7 km^{2})	3,086.9/sq mi (1,191.9/km^{2})	February 28, 1910
Chino Hills	City	San Bernardino	78,411	74,799	+4.8%	44.65 sq mi (115.6 km^{2})	1,756.1/sq mi (678.0/km^{2})	December 1, 1991
Chowchilla	City	Madera	19,039	18,720	+1.7%	11.09 sq mi (28.7 km^{2})	1,716.8/sq mi (662.8/km^{2})	February 7, 1923
Chula Vista	City	San Diego	275,487	243,916	+12.9%	49.64 sq mi (128.6 km^{2})	5,549.7/sq mi (2,142.8/km^{2})	November 28, 1911
Citrus Heights	City	Sacramento	87,583	83,301	+5.1%	14.22 sq mi (36.8 km^{2})	6,159.1/sq mi (2,378.1/km^{2})	January 1, 1997
Claremont	City	Los Angeles	37,266	34,926	+6.7%	13.34 sq mi (34.6 km^{2})	2,793.6/sq mi (1,078.6/km^{2})	October 3, 1907
Clayton	City	Contra Costa	11,070	10,897	+1.6%	3.84 sq mi (9.9 km^{2})	2,882.8/sq mi (1,113.1/km^{2})	March 18, 1964
Clearlake	City	Lake	16,685	15,250	+9.4%	10.13 sq mi (26.2 km^{2})	1,647.1/sq mi (635.9/km^{2})	November 14, 1980
Cloverdale	City	Sonoma	8,996	8,618	+4.4%	3.14 sq mi (8.1 km^{2})	2,865.0/sq mi (1,106.2/km^{2})	February 28, 1872
Clovis	City	Fresno	120,124	95,631	+25.6%	25.42 sq mi (65.8 km^{2})	4,725.6/sq mi (1,824.6/km^{2})	February 27, 1912
Coachella	City	Riverside	41,941	40,704	+3.0%	30.08 sq mi (77.9 km^{2})	1,394.3/sq mi (538.3/km^{2})	December 13, 1946
Coalinga	City	Fresno	17,590	13,380	+31.5%	6.85 sq mi (17.7 km^{2})	2,567.9/sq mi (991.5/km^{2})	April 3, 1906
Colfax	City	Placer	1,995	1,963	+1.6%	1.41 sq mi (3.7 km^{2})	1,414.9/sq mi (546.3/km^{2})	February 23, 1910
Colma	Town	San Mateo	1,507	1,792	−15.9%	1.89 sq mi (4.9 km^{2})	797.4/sq mi (307.9/km^{2})	August 5, 1924
Colton	City	San Bernardino	53,909	52,154	+3.4%	15.55 sq mi (40.3 km^{2})	3,466.8/sq mi (1,338.5/km^{2})	July 11, 1887
Colusa†	City	Colusa	6,411	5,971	+7.4%	3.42 sq mi (8.9 km^{2})	1,874.6/sq mi (723.8/km^{2})	June 16, 1868
Commerce	City	Los Angeles	12,378	12,823	−3.5%	6.53 sq mi (16.9 km^{2})	1,895.6/sq mi (731.9/km^{2})	January 28, 1960
Compton	City	Los Angeles	95,740	96,455	−0.7%	10.03 sq mi (26.0 km^{2})	9,545.4/sq mi (3,685.5/km^{2})	May 11, 1888
Concord	City	Contra Costa	125,410	122,067	+2.7%	30.55 sq mi (79.1 km^{2})	4,105.1/sq mi (1,585.0/km^{2})	February 9, 1905
Corcoran	City	Kings	22,339	24,813	−10.0%	7.46 sq mi (19.3 km^{2})	2,994.5/sq mi (1,156.2/km^{2})	August 11, 1914
Corning	City	Tehama	8,244	7,663	+7.6%	3.55 sq mi (9.2 km^{2})	2,322.3/sq mi (896.6/km^{2})	August 6, 1907
Corona	City	Riverside	157,136	152,374	+3.1%	39.94 sq mi (103.4 km^{2})	3,934.3/sq mi (1,519.0/km^{2})	July 13, 1896
Coronado	City	San Diego	20,192	18,912	+6.8%	7.81 sq mi (20.2 km^{2})	2,585.4/sq mi (998.2/km^{2})	December 11, 1890
Corte Madera	Town	Marin	10,222	9,253	+10.5%	3.16 sq mi (8.2 km^{2})	3,234.8/sq mi (1,249.0/km^{2})	June 10, 1916
Costa Mesa	City	Orange	111,918	109,960	+1.8%	15.81 sq mi (40.9 km^{2})	7,078.9/sq mi (2,733.2/km^{2})	June 29, 1953
Cotati	City	Sonoma	7,584	7,265	+4.4%	1.87 sq mi (4.8 km^{2})	4,055.6/sq mi (1,565.9/km^{2})	July 16, 1963
Covina	City	Los Angeles	51,268	47,796	+7.3%	7.04 sq mi (18.2 km^{2})	7,282.4/sq mi (2,811.7/km^{2})	August 14, 1901
Crescent City†	City	Del Norte	6,673	7,643	−12.7%	1.96 sq mi (5.1 km^{2})	3,404.6/sq mi (1,314.5/km^{2})	April 13, 1854
Cudahy	City	Los Angeles	22,811	23,805	−4.2%	1.18 sq mi (3.1 km^{2})	19,331.4/sq mi (7,463.9/km^{2})	November 10, 1960
Culver City	City	Los Angeles	40,779	38,883	+4.9%	5.11 sq mi (13.2 km^{2})	7,980.2/sq mi (3,081.2/km^{2})	September 7, 1917
Cupertino	City	Santa Clara	60,381	58,302	+3.6%	11.33 sq mi (29.3 km^{2})	5,329.3/sq mi (2,057.7/km^{2})	October 10, 1955
Cypress	City	Orange	50,151	47,802	+4.9%	6.61 sq mi (17.1 km^{2})	7,587.1/sq mi (2,929.4/km^{2})	July 24, 1956
Daly City	City	San Mateo	104,901	101,123	+3.7%	7.64 sq mi (19.8 km^{2})	13,730.5/sq mi (5,301.4/km^{2})	March 22, 1911
Dana Point	City	Orange	33,107	33,351	−0.7%	6.49 sq mi (16.8 km^{2})	5,101.2/sq mi (1,969.6/km^{2})	January 1, 1989
Danville	Town	Contra Costa	43,582	42,039	+3.7%	18.08 sq mi (46.8 km^{2})	2,410.5/sq mi (930.7/km^{2})	July 1, 1982
Davis	City	Yolo	66,850	65,622	+1.9%	9.97 sq mi (25.8 km^{2})	6,705.1/sq mi (2,588.9/km^{2})	March 28, 1917
Del Mar	City	San Diego	3,954	4,161	−5.0%	1.72 sq mi (4.5 km^{2})	2,298.8/sq mi (887.6/km^{2})	July 15, 1959
Del Rey Oaks	City	Monterey	1,592	1,624	−2.0%	1.05 sq mi (2.7 km^{2})	1,516.2/sq mi (585.4/km^{2})	September 3, 1953
Delano	City	Kern	51,428	53,041	−3.0%	14.72 sq mi (38.1 km^{2})	3,493.8/sq mi (1,348.9/km^{2})	April 13, 1915
Desert Hot Springs	City	Riverside	32,512	25,938	+25.3%	30.27 sq mi (78.4 km^{2})	1,074.1/sq mi (414.7/km^{2})	September 25, 1963
Diamond Bar	City	Los Angeles	55,072	55,544	−0.8%	14.87 sq mi (38.5 km^{2})	3,703.6/sq mi (1,430.0/km^{2})	April 18, 1989
Dinuba	City	Tulare	24,563	21,453	+14.5%	6.51 sq mi (16.9 km^{2})	3,773.1/sq mi (1,456.8/km^{2})	January 6, 1906
Dixon	City	Solano	18,988	18,351	+3.5%	7.10 sq mi (18.4 km^{2})	2,674.4/sq mi (1,032.6/km^{2})	March 30, 1878
Dorris	City	Siskiyou	860	939	−8.4%	0.70 sq mi (1.8 km^{2})	1,228.6/sq mi (474.4/km^{2})	December 23, 1908
Dos Palos	City	Merced	5,798	4,950	+17.1%	1.35 sq mi (3.5 km^{2})	4,294.8/sq mi (1,658.2/km^{2})	May 24, 1935
Downey	City	Los Angeles	114,355	111,772	+2.3%	12.41 sq mi (32.1 km^{2})	9,214.7/sq mi (3,557.8/km^{2})	December 17, 1956
Duarte	City	Los Angeles	21,727	21,321	+1.9%	6.71 sq mi (17.4 km^{2})	3,238.0/sq mi (1,250.2/km^{2})	August 22, 1957
Dublin	City	Alameda	72,589	46,036	+57.7%	15.23 sq mi (39.4 km^{2})	4,766.2/sq mi (1,840.2/km^{2})	February 1, 1982
Dunsmuir	City	Siskiyou	1,707	1,650	+3.5%	1.60 sq mi (4.1 km^{2})	1,066.9/sq mi (411.9/km^{2})	August 7, 1909
East Palo Alto	City	San Mateo	30,034	28,155	+6.7%	2.53 sq mi (6.6 km^{2})	11,871.1/sq mi (4,583.5/km^{2})	July 1, 1983
Eastvale	City	Riverside	69,757	53,670	+30.0%	12.67 sq mi (32.8 km^{2})	5,505.7/sq mi (2,125.8/km^{2})	October 1, 2010
El Cajon	City	San Diego	106,215	99,478	+6.8%	14.51 sq mi (37.6 km^{2})	7,320.1/sq mi (2,826.3/km^{2})	November 12, 1912
El Centro†	City	Imperial	44,322	42,598	+4.0%	11.84 sq mi (30.7 km^{2})	3,743.4/sq mi (1,445.3/km^{2})	April 16, 1908
El Cerrito	City	Contra Costa	25,962	23,549	+10.2%	3.67 sq mi (9.5 km^{2})	7,074.1/sq mi (2,731.3/km^{2})	August 23, 1917
El Monte	City	Los Angeles	109,450	113,475	−3.5%	9.56 sq mi (24.8 km^{2})	11,448.7/sq mi (4,420.4/km^{2})	November 18, 1912
El Segundo	City	Los Angeles	17,272	16,654	+3.7%	5.46 sq mi (14.1 km^{2})	3,163.4/sq mi (1,221.4/km^{2})	January 18, 1917
Elk Grove	City	Sacramento	176,124	153,015	+15.1%	41.99 sq mi (108.8 km^{2})	4,194.4/sq mi (1,619.5/km^{2})	July 1, 2000
Emeryville	City	Alameda	12,905	10,080	+28.0%	1.27 sq mi (3.3 km^{2})	10,161.4/sq mi (3,923.3/km^{2})	December 8, 1896
Encinitas	City	San Diego	62,007	59,518	+4.2%	19.06 sq mi (49.4 km^{2})	3,253.3/sq mi (1,256.1/km^{2})	October 1, 1986
Escalon	City	San Joaquin	7,472	7,132	+4.8%	2.28 sq mi (5.9 km^{2})	3,277.2/sq mi (1,265.3/km^{2})	March 12, 1957
Escondido	City	San Diego	151,038	143,911	+5.0%	37.35 sq mi (96.7 km^{2})	4,043.9/sq mi (1,561.3/km^{2})	October 8, 1888
Etna	City	Siskiyou	678	737	−8.0%	0.76 sq mi (2.0 km^{2})	892.1/sq mi (344.4/km^{2})	March 13, 1878
Eureka†	City	Humboldt	26,512	27,191	−2.5%	9.54 sq mi (24.7 km^{2})	2,779.0/sq mi (1,073.0/km^{2})	April 18, 1856
Exeter	City	Tulare	10,321	10,334	−0.1%	2.46 sq mi (6.4 km^{2})	4,195.5/sq mi (1,619.9/km^{2})	March 2, 1911
Fairfax	Town	Marin	7,605	7,441	+2.2%	2.23 sq mi (5.8 km^{2})	3,410.3/sq mi (1,316.7/km^{2})	March 2, 1931
Fairfield†	City	Solano	119,881	105,321	+13.8%	41.59 sq mi (107.7 km^{2})	2,882.4/sq mi (1,112.9/km^{2})	December 12, 1903
Farmersville	City	Tulare	10,397	10,588	−1.8%	2.20 sq mi (5.7 km^{2})	4,725.9/sq mi (1,824.7/km^{2})	October 5, 1960
Ferndale	City	Humboldt	1,398	1,371	+2.0%	1.20 sq mi (3.1 km^{2})	1,165.0/sq mi (449.8/km^{2})	August 28, 1893
Fillmore	City	Ventura	16,419	15,002	+9.4%	3.30 sq mi (8.5 km^{2})	4,975.5/sq mi (1,921.0/km^{2})	July 10, 1914
Firebaugh	City	Fresno	8,096	7,549	+7.2%	3.52 sq mi (9.1 km^{2})	2,300.0/sq mi (888.0/km^{2})	September 17, 1914
Folsom	City	Sacramento	80,454	72,203	+11.4%	27.88 sq mi (72.2 km^{2})	2,885.7/sq mi (1,114.2/km^{2})	April 20, 1946
Fontana	City	San Bernardino	208,393	196,069	+6.3%	43.07 sq mi (111.6 km^{2})	4,838.5/sq mi (1,868.1/km^{2})	June 25, 1952
Fort Bragg	City	Mendocino	6,983	7,273	−4.0%	2.90 sq mi (7.5 km^{2})	2,407.9/sq mi (929.7/km^{2})	August 5, 1889
Fort Jones	Town	Siskiyou	695	839	−17.2%	0.60 sq mi (1.6 km^{2})	1,158.3/sq mi (447.2/km^{2})	March 16, 1872
Fortuna	City	Humboldt	12,516	11,926	+4.9%	5.25 sq mi (13.6 km^{2})	2,384.0/sq mi (920.5/km^{2})	January 20, 1906
Foster City	City	San Mateo	33,805	30,567	+10.6%	3.79 sq mi (9.8 km^{2})	8,919.5/sq mi (3,443.8/km^{2})	April 27, 1971
Fountain Valley	City	Orange	57,047	55,313	+3.1%	9.07 sq mi (23.5 km^{2})	6,289.6/sq mi (2,428.4/km^{2})	June 13, 1957
Fowler	City	Fresno	6,700	5,570	+20.3%	2.53 sq mi (6.6 km^{2})	2,648.2/sq mi (1,022.5/km^{2})	June 15, 1908
Fremont	City	Alameda	230,504	214,089	+7.7%	78.31 sq mi (202.8 km^{2})	2,943.5/sq mi (1,136.5/km^{2})	January 23, 1956
Fresno†	City	Fresno	542,107	494,665	+9.6%	115.18 sq mi (298.3 km^{2})	4,706.6/sq mi (1,817.2/km^{2})	October 12, 1885
Fullerton	City	Orange	143,617	135,161	+6.3%	22.42 sq mi (58.1 km^{2})	6,405.8/sq mi (2,473.3/km^{2})	February 15, 1904
Galt	City	Sacramento	25,383	23,647	+7.3%	7.15 sq mi (18.5 km^{2})	3,550.1/sq mi (1,370.7/km^{2})	August 16, 1946
Garden Grove	City	Orange	171,949	170,883	+0.6%	17.96 sq mi (46.5 km^{2})	9,574.0/sq mi (3,696.5/km^{2})	June 18, 1956
Gardena	City	Los Angeles	61,027	58,829	+3.7%	5.83 sq mi (15.1 km^{2})	10,467.8/sq mi (4,041.6/km^{2})	September 11, 1930
Gilroy	City	Santa Clara	59,520	48,821	+21.9%	16.54 sq mi (42.8 km^{2})	3,598.5/sq mi (1,389.4/km^{2})	March 12, 1870
Glendale	City	Los Angeles	196,543	191,719	+2.5%	30.48 sq mi (78.9 km^{2})	6,448.3/sq mi (2,489.7/km^{2})	February 15, 1906
Glendora	City	Los Angeles	52,558	50,073	+5.0%	19.51 sq mi (50.5 km^{2})	2,693.9/sq mi (1,040.1/km^{2})	November 13, 1911
Goleta	City	Santa Barbara	32,690	29,888	+9.4%	7.85 sq mi (20.3 km^{2})	4,164.3/sq mi (1,607.9/km^{2})	February 1, 2002
Gonzales	City	Monterey	8,647	8,187	+5.6%	1.91 sq mi (4.9 km^{2})	4,527.2/sq mi (1,748.0/km^{2})	January 14, 1947
Grand Terrace	City	San Bernardino	13,150	12,040	+9.2%	3.50 sq mi (9.1 km^{2})	3,757.1/sq mi (1,450.6/km^{2})	November 30, 1978
Grass Valley	City	Nevada	14,016	12,860	+9.0%	5.25 sq mi (13.6 km^{2})	2,669.7/sq mi (1,030.8/km^{2})	March 13, 1893
Greenfield	City	Monterey	18,937	16,330	+16.0%	2.91 sq mi (7.5 km^{2})	6,507.6/sq mi (2,512.6/km^{2})	January 7, 1947
Gridley	City	Butte	7,421	6,584	+12.7%	2.09 sq mi (5.4 km^{2})	3,550.7/sq mi (1,370.9/km^{2})	November 23, 1905
Grover Beach	City	San Luis Obispo	12,701	13,156	−3.5%	2.31 sq mi (6.0 km^{2})	5,498.3/sq mi (2,122.9/km^{2})	December 21, 1959
Guadalupe	City	Santa Barbara	8,057	7,080	+13.8%	1.31 sq mi (3.4 km^{2})	6,150.4/sq mi (2,374.7/km^{2})	August 3, 1946
Gustine	City	Merced	6,110	5,520	+10.7%	1.55 sq mi (4.0 km^{2})	3,941.9/sq mi (1,522.0/km^{2})	November 11, 1915
Half Moon Bay	City	San Mateo	11,795	11,324	+4.2%	6.24 sq mi (16.2 km^{2})	1,890.2/sq mi (729.8/km^{2})	July 15, 1959
Hanford†	City	Kings	57,990	53,967	+7.5%	17.40 sq mi (45.1 km^{2})	3,332.8/sq mi (1,286.8/km^{2})	August 12, 1891
Hawaiian Gardens	City	Los Angeles	14,149	14,254	−0.7%	0.95 sq mi (2.5 km^{2})	14,893.7/sq mi (5,750.5/km^{2})	April 9, 1964
Hawthorne	City	Los Angeles	88,083	84,293	+4.5%	6.09 sq mi (15.8 km^{2})	14,463.5/sq mi (5,584.4/km^{2})	July 12, 1922
Hayward	City	Alameda	162,954	144,186	+13.0%	45.82 sq mi (118.7 km^{2})	3,556.4/sq mi (1,373.1/km^{2})	March 11, 1876
Healdsburg	City	Sonoma	11,340	11,254	+0.8%	4.42 sq mi (11.4 km^{2})	2,565.6/sq mi (990.6/km^{2})	February 20, 1867
Hemet	City	Riverside	89,833	78,657	+14.2%	29.28 sq mi (75.8 km^{2})	3,068.1/sq mi (1,184.6/km^{2})	January 20, 1910
Hercules	City	Contra Costa	26,016	24,060	+8.1%	6.41 sq mi (16.6 km^{2})	4,058.7/sq mi (1,567.1/km^{2})	December 15, 1900
Hermosa Beach	City	Los Angeles	19,728	19,506	+1.1%	1.43 sq mi (3.7 km^{2})	13,795.8/sq mi (5,326.6/km^{2})	January 14, 1907
Hesperia	City	San Bernardino	99,818	90,173	+10.7%	72.68 sq mi (188.2 km^{2})	1,373.4/sq mi (530.3/km^{2})	July 1, 1988
Hidden Hills	City	Los Angeles	1,725	1,856	−7.1%	1.69 sq mi (4.4 km^{2})	1,020.7/sq mi (394.1/km^{2})	January 19, 1961
Highland	City	San Bernardino	56,999	53,104	+7.3%	18.57 sq mi (48.1 km^{2})	3,069.4/sq mi (1,185.1/km^{2})	November 24, 1987
Hillsborough	Town	San Mateo	11,387	10,825	+5.2%	6.17 sq mi (16.0 km^{2})	1,845.5/sq mi (712.6/km^{2})	May 5, 1910
Hollister†	City	San Benito	41,678	34,928	+19.3%	7.96 sq mi (20.6 km^{2})	5,235.9/sq mi (2,021.6/km^{2})	March 26, 1872
Holtville	City	Imperial	5,605	5,939	−5.6%	1.15 sq mi (3.0 km^{2})	4,873.9/sq mi (1,881.8/km^{2})	July 1, 1908
Hughson	City	Stanislaus	7,481	6,640	+12.7%	1.91 sq mi (4.9 km^{2})	3,916.8/sq mi (1,512.3/km^{2})	December 9, 1972
Huntington Beach	City	Orange	198,711	189,992	+4.6%	27.00 sq mi (69.9 km^{2})	7,359.7/sq mi (2,841.6/km^{2})	February 17, 1909
Huntington Park	City	Los Angeles	54,883	58,114	−5.6%	3.01 sq mi (7.8 km^{2})	18,233.6/sq mi (7,040.0/km^{2})	September 1, 1906
Huron	City	Fresno	6,206	6,754	−8.1%	1.60 sq mi (4.1 km^{2})	3,878.8/sq mi (1,497.6/km^{2})	May 3, 1951
Imperial	City	Imperial	20,263	14,758	+37.3%	6.29 sq mi (16.3 km^{2})	3,221.5/sq mi (1,243.8/km^{2})	July 12, 1904
Imperial Beach	City	San Diego	26,137	26,324	−0.7%	4.29 sq mi (11.1 km^{2})	6,092.5/sq mi (2,352.3/km^{2})	July 18, 1956
Indian Wells	City	Riverside	4,757	4,958	−4.1%	14.32 sq mi (37.1 km^{2})	332.2/sq mi (128.3/km^{2})	July 14, 1967
Indio	City	Riverside	89,137	76,036	+17.2%	33.23 sq mi (86.1 km^{2})	2,682.4/sq mi (1,035.7/km^{2})	May 16, 1930
City of Industry	City	Los Angeles	264	219	+20.5%	11.78 sq mi (30.5 km^{2})	22.4/sq mi (8.7/km^{2})	June 18, 1957
Inglewood	City	Los Angeles	107,762	109,673	−1.7%	9.07 sq mi (23.5 km^{2})	11,881.1/sq mi (4,587.3/km^{2})	February 7, 1908
Ione	City	Amador	5,141	7,918	−35.1%	4.58 sq mi (11.9 km^{2})	1,122.5/sq mi (433.4/km^{2})	March 23, 1953
Irvine	City	Orange	307,670	212,375	+44.9%	65.61 sq mi (169.9 km^{2})	4,689.4/sq mi (1,810.6/km^{2})	December 28, 1971
Irwindale	City	Los Angeles	1,472	1,422	+3.5%	8.83 sq mi (22.9 km^{2})	166.7/sq mi (64.4/km^{2})	August 6, 1957
Isleton	City	Sacramento	794	804	−1.2%	0.44 sq mi (1.1 km^{2})	1,804.5/sq mi (696.7/km^{2})	May 14, 1923
Jackson†	City	Amador	5,019	4,651	+7.9%	3.58 sq mi (9.3 km^{2})	1,402.0/sq mi (541.3/km^{2})	December 5, 1905
Jurupa Valley	City	Riverside	105,053	95,004	+10.6%	42.94 sq mi (111.2 km^{2})	2,446.5/sq mi (944.6/km^{2})	July 1, 2011
Kerman	City	Fresno	16,016	13,544	+18.3%	3.27 sq mi (8.5 km^{2})	4,897.9/sq mi (1,891.1/km^{2})	July 2, 1946
King City	City	Monterey	13,332	12,874	+3.6%	3.80 sq mi (9.8 km^{2})	3,508.4/sq mi (1,354.6/km^{2})	February 9, 1911
Kingsburg	City	Fresno	12,380	11,382	+8.8%	3.72 sq mi (9.6 km^{2})	3,328.0/sq mi (1,284.9/km^{2})	May 29, 1908
La Cañada Flintridge	City	Los Angeles	20,573	20,246	+1.6%	8.63 sq mi (22.4 km^{2})	2,383.9/sq mi (920.4/km^{2})	November 30, 1976
La Habra	City	Orange	63,097	60,239	+4.7%	7.56 sq mi (19.6 km^{2})	8,346.2/sq mi (3,222.5/km^{2})	January 20, 1925
La Habra Heights	City	Los Angeles	5,682	5,325	+6.7%	6.16 sq mi (16.0 km^{2})	922.4/sq mi (356.1/km^{2})	December 4, 1978
La Mesa	City	San Diego	61,121	57,065	+7.1%	9.09 sq mi (23.5 km^{2})	6,724.0/sq mi (2,596.1/km^{2})	February 16, 1912
La Mirada	City	Los Angeles	48,008	48,527	−1.1%	7.82 sq mi (20.3 km^{2})	6,139.1/sq mi (2,370.3/km^{2})	March 23, 1960
La Palma	City	Orange	15,581	15,568	+0.1%	1.78 sq mi (4.6 km^{2})	8,753.4/sq mi (3,379.7/km^{2})	October 26, 1955
La Puente	City	Los Angeles	38,062	39,816	−4.4%	3.48 sq mi (9.0 km^{2})	10,937.4/sq mi (4,222.9/km^{2})	August 1, 1956
La Quinta	City	Riverside	37,558	37,467	+0.2%	35.26 sq mi (91.3 km^{2})	1,065.2/sq mi (411.3/km^{2})	May 1, 1982
La Verne	City	Los Angeles	31,334	31,063	+0.9%	8.42 sq mi (21.8 km^{2})	3,721.4/sq mi (1,436.8/km^{2})	August 20, 1906
Lafayette	City	Contra Costa	25,391	23,893	+6.3%	15.02 sq mi (38.9 km^{2})	1,690.5/sq mi (652.7/km^{2})	July 29, 1968
Laguna Beach	City	Orange	23,032	22,723	+1.4%	8.89 sq mi (23.0 km^{2})	2,590.8/sq mi (1,000.3/km^{2})	June 29, 1927
Laguna Hills	City	Orange	31,374	30,344	+3.4%	6.55 sq mi (17.0 km^{2})	4,789.9/sq mi (1,849.4/km^{2})	December 20, 1991
Laguna Niguel	City	Orange	64,355	62,979	+2.2%	14.74 sq mi (38.2 km^{2})	4,366.0/sq mi (1,685.7/km^{2})	December 1, 1989
Laguna Woods	City	Orange	17,644	16,192	+9.0%	3.34 sq mi (8.7 km^{2})	5,282.6/sq mi (2,039.6/km^{2})	March 24, 1999
Lake Elsinore	City	Riverside	70,265	51,821	+35.6%	38.24 sq mi (99.0 km^{2})	1,837.5/sq mi (709.5/km^{2})	April 9, 1888
Lake Forest	City	Orange	85,858	77,264	+11.1%	16.71 sq mi (43.3 km^{2})	5,138.1/sq mi (1,983.8/km^{2})	December 20, 1991
Lakeport†	City	Lake	5,026	4,753	+5.7%	3.06 sq mi (7.9 km^{2})	1,642.5/sq mi (634.2/km^{2})	April 30, 1888
Lakewood	City	Los Angeles	82,496	80,048	+3.1%	9.40 sq mi (24.3 km^{2})	8,776.2/sq mi (3,388.5/km^{2})	April 16, 1954
Lancaster	City	Los Angeles	173,516	156,633	+10.8%	94.27 sq mi (244.2 km^{2})	1,840.6/sq mi (710.7/km^{2})	November 22, 1977
Larkspur	City	Marin	13,064	11,926	+9.5%	3.00 sq mi (7.8 km^{2})	4,354.7/sq mi (1,681.3/km^{2})	March 1, 1908
Lathrop	City	San Joaquin	28,701	18,023	+59.2%	19.83 sq mi (51.4 km^{2})	1,447.4/sq mi (558.8/km^{2})	July 1, 1989
Lawndale	City	Los Angeles	31,807	32,769	−2.9%	1.97 sq mi (5.1 km^{2})	16,145.7/sq mi (6,233.9/km^{2})	December 28, 1959
Lemon Grove	City	San Diego	27,627	25,320	+9.1%	3.88 sq mi (10.0 km^{2})	7,120.4/sq mi (2,749.2/km^{2})	July 1, 1977
Lemoore	City	Kings	27,038	24,531	+10.2%	8.81 sq mi (22.8 km^{2})	3,069.0/sq mi (1,185.0/km^{2})	July 4, 1900
Lincoln	City	Placer	49,757	42,819	+16.2%	24.17 sq mi (62.6 km^{2})	2,058.6/sq mi (794.8/km^{2})	August 7, 1890
Lindsay	City	Tulare	12,659	11,768	+7.6%	2.72 sq mi (7.0 km^{2})	4,654.0/sq mi (1,796.9/km^{2})	February 28, 1910
Live Oak	City	Sutter	9,106	8,392	+8.5%	3.12 sq mi (8.1 km^{2})	2,918.6/sq mi (1,126.9/km^{2})	January 22, 1947
Livermore	City	Alameda	87,955	80,968	+8.6%	26.45 sq mi (68.5 km^{2})	3,325.3/sq mi (1,283.9/km^{2})	April 1, 1876
Livingston	City	Merced	14,172	13,058	+8.5%	3.68 sq mi (9.5 km^{2})	3,851.1/sq mi (1,486.9/km^{2})	September 11, 1922
Lodi	City	San Joaquin	66,348	62,134	+6.8%	13.64 sq mi (35.3 km^{2})	4,864.2/sq mi (1,878.1/km^{2})	December 6, 1906
Loma Linda	City	San Bernardino	24,791	23,261	+6.6%	7.64 sq mi (19.8 km^{2})	3,244.9/sq mi (1,252.9/km^{2})	September 29, 1970
Lomita	City	Los Angeles	20,921	20,256	+3.3%	1.91 sq mi (4.9 km^{2})	10,953.4/sq mi (4,229.1/km^{2})	June 30, 1964
Lompoc	City	Santa Barbara	44,444	42,434	+4.7%	11.62 sq mi (30.1 km^{2})	3,824.8/sq mi (1,476.8/km^{2})	August 13, 1888
Long Beach	City	Los Angeles	466,742	462,257	+1.0%	50.71 sq mi (131.3 km^{2})	9,204.1/sq mi (3,553.7/km^{2})	December 13, 1897
Loomis	Town	Placer	6,836	6,430	+6.3%	7.27 sq mi (18.8 km^{2})	940.3/sq mi (363.1/km^{2})	December 17, 1984
Los Alamitos	City	Orange	11,780	11,449	+2.9%	4.01 sq mi (10.4 km^{2})	2,937.7/sq mi (1,134.2/km^{2})	March 1, 1960
Los Altos	City	Santa Clara	31,625	28,976	+9.1%	6.54 sq mi (16.9 km^{2})	4,835.6/sq mi (1,867.0/km^{2})	December 1, 1952
Los Altos Hills	Town	Santa Clara	8,489	7,922	+7.2%	9.03 sq mi (23.4 km^{2})	940.1/sq mi (363.0/km^{2})	January 27, 1956
Los Angeles†	City	Los Angeles	3,898,747	3,792,621	+2.8%	469.49 sq mi (1,216.0 km^{2})	8,304.2/sq mi (3,206.3/km^{2})	April 4, 1850
Los Banos	City	Merced	45,532	35,972	+26.6%	9.99 sq mi (25.9 km^{2})	4,557.8/sq mi (1,759.8/km^{2})	May 8, 1907
Los Gatos	Town	Santa Clara	33,529	29,413	+14.0%	11.55 sq mi (29.9 km^{2})	2,902.9/sq mi (1,120.8/km^{2})	August 10, 1887
Loyalton	City	Sierra	740	769	−3.8%	0.36 sq mi (0.93 km^{2})	2,055.6/sq mi (793.7/km^{2})	July 21, 1901
Lynwood	City	Los Angeles	67,265	69,772	−3.6%	4.84 sq mi (12.5 km^{2})	13,897.7/sq mi (5,365.9/km^{2})	July 21, 1921
Madera†	City	Madera	66,224	61,416	+7.8%	16.48 sq mi (42.7 km^{2})	4,018.4/sq mi (1,551.5/km^{2})	March 27, 1907
Malibu	City	Los Angeles	10,654	12,645	−15.7%	19.85 sq mi (51.4 km^{2})	536.7/sq mi (207.2/km^{2})	March 28, 1991
Mammoth Lakes	Town	Mono	7,191	8,234	−12.7%	24.87 sq mi (64.4 km^{2})	289.1/sq mi (111.6/km^{2})	August 20, 1984
Manhattan Beach	City	Los Angeles	35,506	35,135	+1.1%	3.93 sq mi (10.2 km^{2})	9,034.6/sq mi (3,488.3/km^{2})	December 12, 1912
Manteca	City	San Joaquin	83,498	67,096	+24.4%	21.39 sq mi (55.4 km^{2})	3,903.6/sq mi (1,507.2/km^{2})	June 5, 1918
Maricopa	City	Kern	1,026	1,154	−11.1%	1.57 sq mi (4.1 km^{2})	653.5/sq mi (252.3/km^{2})	July 25, 1911
Marina	City	Monterey	22,359	19,718	+13.4%	8.91 sq mi (23.1 km^{2})	2,509.4/sq mi (968.9/km^{2})	November 13, 1975
Martinez†	City	Contra Costa	37,287	35,824	+4.1%	12.63 sq mi (32.7 km^{2})	2,952.3/sq mi (1,139.9/km^{2})	April 1, 1876
Marysville†	City	Yuba	12,844	12,072	+6.4%	3.46 sq mi (9.0 km^{2})	3,712.1/sq mi (1,433.3/km^{2})	February 5, 1851
Maywood	City	Los Angeles	25,138	27,395	−8.2%	1.17 sq mi (3.0 km^{2})	21,485.5/sq mi (8,295.6/km^{2})	September 2, 1924
McFarland	City	Kern	14,161	12,707	+11.4%	2.68 sq mi (6.9 km^{2})	5,284.0/sq mi (2,040.1/km^{2})	July 18, 1957
Mendota	City	Fresno	12,595	11,014	+14.4%	3.39 sq mi (8.8 km^{2})	3,715.3/sq mi (1,434.5/km^{2})	June 17, 1942
Menifee	City	Riverside	102,527	77,519	+32.3%	46.48 sq mi (120.4 km^{2})	2,205.8/sq mi (851.7/km^{2})	October 1, 2008
Menlo Park	City	San Mateo	33,780	32,026	+5.5%	9.99 sq mi (25.9 km^{2})	3,381.4/sq mi (1,305.6/km^{2})	November 23, 1927
Merced†	City	Merced	86,333	78,958	+9.3%	23.25 sq mi (60.2 km^{2})	3,713.2/sq mi (1,433.7/km^{2})	April 1, 1889
Mill Valley	City	Marin	14,231	13,903	+2.4%	4.78 sq mi (12.4 km^{2})	2,977.2/sq mi (1,149.5/km^{2})	September 1, 1900
Millbrae	City	San Mateo	23,216	21,532	+7.8%	3.27 sq mi (8.5 km^{2})	7,099.7/sq mi (2,741.2/km^{2})	January 14, 1948
Milpitas	City	Santa Clara	80,273	66,790	+20.2%	13.48 sq mi (34.9 km^{2})	5,955.0/sq mi (2,299.2/km^{2})	January 26, 1954
Mission Viejo	City	Orange	93,653	93,305	+0.4%	17.66 sq mi (45.7 km^{2})	5,303.1/sq mi (2,047.5/km^{2})	March 31, 1988
Modesto†	City	Stanislaus	218,464	201,165	+8.6%	43.05 sq mi (111.5 km^{2})	5,074.7/sq mi (1,959.3/km^{2})	August 6, 1884
Monrovia	City	Los Angeles	37,931	36,590	+3.7%	13.63 sq mi (35.3 km^{2})	2,782.9/sq mi (1,074.5/km^{2})	December 15, 1887
Montague	City	Siskiyou	1,226	1,443	−15.0%	1.78 sq mi (4.6 km^{2})	688.8/sq mi (265.9/km^{2})	January 28, 1909
Montclair	City	San Bernardino	37,865	36,664	+3.3%	5.53 sq mi (14.3 km^{2})	6,847.2/sq mi (2,643.7/km^{2})	April 25, 1956
Monte Sereno	City	Santa Clara	3,479	3,341	+4.1%	1.63 sq mi (4.2 km^{2})	2,134.4/sq mi (824.1/km^{2})	May 14, 1957
Montebello	City	Los Angeles	62,640	62,500	+0.2%	8.33 sq mi (21.6 km^{2})	7,519.8/sq mi (2,903.4/km^{2})	October 16, 1920
Monterey	City	Monterey	30,218	27,810	+8.7%	8.65 sq mi (22.4 km^{2})	3,493.4/sq mi (1,348.8/km^{2})	June 14, 1890
Monterey Park	City	Los Angeles	61,096	60,269	+1.4%	7.67 sq mi (19.9 km^{2})	7,965.6/sq mi (3,075.5/km^{2})	May 29, 1916
Moorpark	City	Ventura	36,284	34,421	+5.4%	12.28 sq mi (31.8 km^{2})	2,954.7/sq mi (1,140.8/km^{2})	July 1, 1983
Moraga	Town	Contra Costa	16,870	16,016	+5.3%	9.46 sq mi (24.5 km^{2})	1,783.3/sq mi (688.5/km^{2})	November 13, 1974
Moreno Valley	City	Riverside	208,634	193,365	+7.9%	51.33 sq mi (132.9 km^{2})	4,064.6/sq mi (1,569.3/km^{2})	December 3, 1984
Morgan Hill	City	Santa Clara	45,483	37,882	+20.1%	12.94 sq mi (33.5 km^{2})	3,514.9/sq mi (1,357.1/km^{2})	November 10, 1906
Morro Bay	City	San Luis Obispo	10,757	10,234	+5.1%	5.33 sq mi (13.8 km^{2})	2,018.2/sq mi (779.2/km^{2})	July 17, 1964
Mount Shasta	City	Siskiyou	3,223	3,394	−5.0%	3.77 sq mi (9.8 km^{2})	854.9/sq mi (330.1/km^{2})	May 31, 1905
Mountain House	City	San Joaquin	24,499	9,675	+153.2%	4.558 sq mi (11.81 km^{2})	5,374.9/sq mi (2,075.3/km^{2})	July 1, 2024
Mountain View	City	Santa Clara	82,376	74,066	+11.2%	11.96 sq mi (31.0 km^{2})	6,887.6/sq mi (2,659.3/km^{2})	November 7, 1902
Murrieta	City	Riverside	110,949	103,466	+7.2%	33.61 sq mi (87.0 km^{2})	3,301.1/sq mi (1,274.6/km^{2})	July 1, 1991
Napa†	City	Napa	79,246	76,915	+3.0%	18.05 sq mi (46.7 km^{2})	4,390.4/sq mi (1,695.1/km^{2})	March 23, 1872
National City	City	San Diego	56,173	58,582	−4.1%	7.30 sq mi (18.9 km^{2})	7,694.9/sq mi (2,971.0/km^{2})	September 17, 1887
Needles	City	San Bernardino	4,931	4,844	+1.8%	30.58 sq mi (79.2 km^{2})	161.2/sq mi (62.3/km^{2})	October 30, 1913
Nevada City†	City	Nevada	3,152	3,068	+2.7%	2.19 sq mi (5.7 km^{2})	1,439.3/sq mi (555.7/km^{2})	April 19, 1856
Newark	City	Alameda	47,529	42,573	+11.6%	13.92 sq mi (36.1 km^{2})	3,414.4/sq mi (1,318.3/km^{2})	September 22, 1955
Newman	City	Stanislaus	12,351	10,224	+20.8%	2.06 sq mi (5.3 km^{2})	5,995.6/sq mi (2,314.9/km^{2})	June 10, 1908
Newport Beach	City	Orange	85,239	85,186	+0.1%	23.79 sq mi (61.6 km^{2})	3,583.0/sq mi (1,383.4/km^{2})	September 1, 1906
Norco	City	Riverside	26,316	27,063	−2.8%	13.86 sq mi (35.9 km^{2})	1,898.7/sq mi (733.1/km^{2})	December 28, 1964
Norwalk	City	Los Angeles	102,773	105,549	−2.6%	9.71 sq mi (25.1 km^{2})	10,584.2/sq mi (4,086.6/km^{2})	August 26, 1957
Novato	City	Marin	53,225	51,904	+2.5%	27.48 sq mi (71.2 km^{2})	1,936.9/sq mi (747.8/km^{2})	January 20, 1960
Oakdale	City	Stanislaus	23,181	20,675	+12.1%	6.23 sq mi (16.1 km^{2})	3,720.9/sq mi (1,436.6/km^{2})	November 24, 1906
Oakland†	City	Alameda	440,646	390,724	+12.8%	55.93 sq mi (144.9 km^{2})	7,878.5/sq mi (3,041.9/km^{2})	May 4, 1852
Oakley	City	Contra Costa	43,357	35,432	+22.4%	15.87 sq mi (41.1 km^{2})	2,732.0/sq mi (1,054.8/km^{2})	July 1, 1999
Oceanside	City	San Diego	174,068	167,086	+4.2%	41.27 sq mi (106.9 km^{2})	4,217.8/sq mi (1,628.5/km^{2})	July 3, 1888
Ojai	City	Ventura	7,637	7,461	+2.4%	4.36 sq mi (11.3 km^{2})	1,751.6/sq mi (676.3/km^{2})	August 5, 1921
Ontario	City	San Bernardino	175,265	163,924	+6.9%	49.97 sq mi (129.4 km^{2})	3,507.4/sq mi (1,354.2/km^{2})	December 10, 1891
Orange	City	Orange	139,911	134,616	+3.9%	25.67 sq mi (66.5 km^{2})	5,450.4/sq mi (2,104.4/km^{2})	April 6, 1888
Orange Cove	City	Fresno	9,649	9,078	+6.3%	1.79 sq mi (4.6 km^{2})	5,390.5/sq mi (2,081.3/km^{2})	January 20, 1948
Orinda	City	Contra Costa	19,514	17,643	+10.6%	12.85 sq mi (33.3 km^{2})	1,518.6/sq mi (586.3/km^{2})	July 1, 1985
Orland	City	Glenn	8,298	7,291	+13.8%	2.99 sq mi (7.7 km^{2})	2,775.3/sq mi (1,071.5/km^{2})	November 11, 1909
Oroville†	City	Butte	20,042	15,546	+28.9%	13.83 sq mi (35.8 km^{2})	1,449.2/sq mi (559.5/km^{2})	January 3, 1906
Oxnard	City	Ventura	202,063	197,899	+2.1%	26.53 sq mi (68.7 km^{2})	7,616.4/sq mi (2,940.7/km^{2})	June 30, 1903
Pacific Grove	City	Monterey	15,090	15,041	+0.3%	2.87 sq mi (7.4 km^{2})	5,257.8/sq mi (2,030.1/km^{2})	July 5, 1889
Pacifica	City	San Mateo	38,640	37,234	+3.8%	12.58 sq mi (32.6 km^{2})	3,071.5/sq mi (1,185.9/km^{2})	November 22, 1957
Palm Desert	City	Riverside	51,163	48,445	+5.6%	26.81 sq mi (69.4 km^{2})	1,908.4/sq mi (736.8/km^{2})	November 26, 1973
Palm Springs	City	Riverside	44,575	44,552	+0.1%	94.55 sq mi (244.9 km^{2})	471.4/sq mi (182.0/km^{2})	April 20, 1938
Palmdale	City	Los Angeles	169,450	152,750	+10.9%	106.06 sq mi (274.7 km^{2})	1,597.7/sq mi (616.9/km^{2})	August 24, 1962
Palo Alto	City	Santa Clara	68,572	64,403	+6.5%	24.10 sq mi (62.4 km^{2})	2,845.3/sq mi (1,098.6/km^{2})	April 23, 1894
Palos Verdes Estates	City	Los Angeles	13,347	13,438	−0.7%	4.78 sq mi (12.4 km^{2})	2,792.3/sq mi (1,078.1/km^{2})	December 20, 1939
Paradise	Town	Butte	4,764	26,218	−81.8%	18.32 sq mi (47.4 km^{2})	260.0/sq mi (100.4/km^{2})	November 27, 1979
Paramount	City	Los Angeles	53,733	54,098	−0.7%	4.73 sq mi (12.3 km^{2})	11,360.0/sq mi (4,386.1/km^{2})	January 30, 1957
Parlier	City	Fresno	14,576	14,494	+0.6%	2.41 sq mi (6.2 km^{2})	6,048.1/sq mi (2,335.2/km^{2})	November 15, 1921
Pasadena	City	Los Angeles	138,699	137,122	+1.2%	22.96 sq mi (59.5 km^{2})	6,040.9/sq mi (2,332.4/km^{2})	June 19, 1886
Paso Robles	City	San Luis Obispo	31,490	29,793	+5.7%	19.65 sq mi (50.9 km^{2})	1,602.5/sq mi (618.7/km^{2})	March 11, 1889
Patterson	City	Stanislaus	23,781	20,413	+16.5%	7.79 sq mi (20.2 km^{2})	3,052.8/sq mi (1,178.7/km^{2})	December 22, 1919
Perris	City	Riverside	78,700	68,386	+15.1%	31.53 sq mi (81.7 km^{2})	2,496.0/sq mi (963.7/km^{2})	May 26, 1911
Petaluma	City	Sonoma	59,776	57,941	+3.2%	14.42 sq mi (37.3 km^{2})	4,145.4/sq mi (1,600.5/km^{2})	April 12, 1858
Pico Rivera	City	Los Angeles	62,088	62,942	−1.4%	8.32 sq mi (21.5 km^{2})	7,462.5/sq mi (2,881.3/km^{2})	January 29, 1958
Piedmont	City	Alameda	11,270	10,667	+5.7%	1.70 sq mi (4.4 km^{2})	6,629.4/sq mi (2,559.6/km^{2})	January 31, 1907
Pinole	City	Contra Costa	19,022	18,390	+3.4%	5.10 sq mi (13.2 km^{2})	3,729.8/sq mi (1,440.1/km^{2})	June 25, 1903
Pismo Beach	City	San Luis Obispo	8,072	7,655	+5.4%	3.50 sq mi (9.1 km^{2})	2,306.3/sq mi (890.5/km^{2})	April 25, 1946
Pittsburg	City	Contra Costa	76,416	63,264	+20.8%	17.68 sq mi (45.8 km^{2})	4,322.2/sq mi (1,668.8/km^{2})	June 25, 1903
Placentia	City	Orange	51,824	50,533	+2.6%	6.61 sq mi (17.1 km^{2})	7,840.2/sq mi (3,027.1/km^{2})	December 2, 1926
Placerville†	City	El Dorado	10,747	10,389	+3.4%	5.84 sq mi (15.1 km^{2})	1,840.2/sq mi (710.5/km^{2})	May 13, 1854
Pleasant Hill	City	Contra Costa	34,613	33,152	+4.4%	7.08 sq mi (18.3 km^{2})	4,888.8/sq mi (1,887.6/km^{2})	November 14, 1961
Pleasanton	City	Alameda	79,871	70,285	+13.6%	24.14 sq mi (62.5 km^{2})	3,308.7/sq mi (1,277.5/km^{2})	June 18, 1894
Plymouth	City	Amador	1,078	1,005	+7.3%	2.65 sq mi (6.9 km^{2})	406.8/sq mi (157.1/km^{2})	February 8, 1917
Point Arena	City	Mendocino	460	449	+2.4%	1.37 sq mi (3.5 km^{2})	335.8/sq mi (129.6/km^{2})	July 11, 1908
Pomona	City	Los Angeles	151,713	149,058	+1.8%	22.99 sq mi (59.5 km^{2})	6,599.1/sq mi (2,547.9/km^{2})	January 6, 1888
Port Hueneme	City	Ventura	21,954	21,723	+1.1%	4.42 sq mi (11.4 km^{2})	4,967.0/sq mi (1,917.8/km^{2})	March 24, 1948
Porterville	City	Tulare	62,623	54,165	+15.6%	18.65 sq mi (48.3 km^{2})	3,357.8/sq mi (1,296.5/km^{2})	May 7, 1902
Portola	City	Plumas	2,100	2,104	−0.2%	5.41 sq mi (14.0 km^{2})	388.2/sq mi (149.9/km^{2})	May 16, 1946
Portola Valley	Town	San Mateo	4,456	4,353	+2.4%	9.08 sq mi (23.5 km^{2})	490.7/sq mi (189.5/km^{2})	July 14, 1964
Poway	City	San Diego	48,841	47,811	+2.2%	39.08 sq mi (101.2 km^{2})	1,249.8/sq mi (482.5/km^{2})	December 1, 1980
Rancho Cordova	City	Sacramento	79,332	64,776	+22.5%	34.57 sq mi (89.5 km^{2})	2,294.8/sq mi (886.0/km^{2})	July 1, 2003
Rancho Cucamonga	City	San Bernardino	174,453	165,269	+5.6%	40.11 sq mi (103.9 km^{2})	4,349.4/sq mi (1,679.3/km^{2})	November 30, 1977
Rancho Mirage	City	Riverside	16,999	17,218	−1.3%	25.35 sq mi (65.7 km^{2})	670.6/sq mi (258.9/km^{2})	August 3, 1973
Rancho Palos Verdes	City	Los Angeles	42,287	41,643	+1.5%	13.47 sq mi (34.9 km^{2})	3,139.3/sq mi (1,212.1/km^{2})	September 7, 1973
Rancho Santa Margarita	City	Orange	47,949	47,853	+0.2%	12.90 sq mi (33.4 km^{2})	3,717.0/sq mi (1,435.1/km^{2})	January 1, 2000
Red Bluff†	City	Tehama	14,710	14,076	+4.5%	7.56 sq mi (19.6 km^{2})	1,945.8/sq mi (751.3/km^{2})	March 31, 1876
Redding†	City	Shasta	93,611	89,861	+4.2%	59.65 sq mi (154.5 km^{2})	1,569.3/sq mi (605.9/km^{2})	October 4, 1887
Redlands	City	San Bernardino	73,168	68,747	+6.4%	35.99 sq mi (93.2 km^{2})	2,033.0/sq mi (784.9/km^{2})	December 3, 1888
Redondo Beach	City	Los Angeles	71,576	66,747	+7.2%	6.21 sq mi (16.1 km^{2})	11,525.9/sq mi (4,450.2/km^{2})	April 29, 1892
Redwood City†	City	San Mateo	84,292	76,815	+9.7%	19.34 sq mi (50.1 km^{2})	4,358.4/sq mi (1,682.8/km^{2})	May 11, 1867
Reedley	City	Fresno	25,227	24,194	+4.3%	5.51 sq mi (14.3 km^{2})	4,578.4/sq mi (1,767.7/km^{2})	February 18, 1913
Rialto	City	San Bernardino	104,026	99,171	+4.9%	24.09 sq mi (62.4 km^{2})	4,318.2/sq mi (1,667.3/km^{2})	November 17, 1911
Richmond	City	Contra Costa	116,448	103,701	+12.3%	30.05 sq mi (77.8 km^{2})	3,875.1/sq mi (1,496.2/km^{2})	August 7, 1905
Ridgecrest	City	Kern	27,959	27,616	+1.2%	20.86 sq mi (54.0 km^{2})	1,340.3/sq mi (517.5/km^{2})	November 29, 1963
Rio Dell	City	Humboldt	3,379	3,368	+0.3%	2.28 sq mi (5.9 km^{2})	1,482.0/sq mi (572.2/km^{2})	February 23, 1965
Rio Vista	City	Solano	10,005	7,360	+35.9%	6.60 sq mi (17.1 km^{2})	1,515.9/sq mi (585.3/km^{2})	January 6, 1894
Ripon	City	San Joaquin	16,013	14,297	+12.0%	5.33 sq mi (13.8 km^{2})	3,004.3/sq mi (1,160.0/km^{2})	November 27, 1945
Riverbank	City	Stanislaus	24,865	22,678	+9.6%	4.71 sq mi (12.2 km^{2})	5,279.2/sq mi (2,038.3/km^{2})	August 23, 1922
Riverside†	City	Riverside	314,998	303,871	+3.7%	81.23 sq mi (210.4 km^{2})	3,877.9/sq mi (1,497.2/km^{2})	October 11, 1883
Rocklin	City	Placer	71,601	56,974	+25.7%	19.81 sq mi (51.3 km^{2})	3,614.4/sq mi (1,395.5/km^{2})	February 24, 1893
Rohnert Park	City	Sonoma	44,390	40,971	+8.3%	7.29 sq mi (18.9 km^{2})	6,089.2/sq mi (2,351.0/km^{2})	August 28, 1962
Rolling Hills	City	Los Angeles	1,739	1,860	−6.5%	2.99 sq mi (7.7 km^{2})	581.6/sq mi (224.6/km^{2})	January 24, 1957
Rolling Hills Estates	City	Los Angeles	8,280	8,067	+2.6%	3.58 sq mi (9.3 km^{2})	2,312.8/sq mi (893.0/km^{2})	September 18, 1957
Rosemead	City	Los Angeles	51,185	53,764	−4.8%	5.16 sq mi (13.4 km^{2})	9,919.6/sq mi (3,830.0/km^{2})	August 4, 1959
Roseville	City	Placer	147,773	118,788	+24.4%	44.08 sq mi (114.2 km^{2})	3,352.4/sq mi (1,294.4/km^{2})	April 10, 1909
Ross	Town	Marin	2,338	2,415	−3.2%	1.56 sq mi (4.0 km^{2})	1,498.7/sq mi (578.7/km^{2})	August 21, 1908
Sacramento‡	City	Sacramento	524,943	466,488	+12.5%	98.61 sq mi (255.4 km^{2})	5,323.4/sq mi (2,055.4/km^{2})	February 27, 1850
St. Helena	City	Napa	5,430	5,814	−6.6%	4.96 sq mi (12.8 km^{2})	1,094.8/sq mi (422.7/km^{2})	March 24, 1876
Salinas†	City	Monterey	163,542	150,441	+8.7%	23.52 sq mi (60.9 km^{2})	6,953.3/sq mi (2,684.7/km^{2})	March 4, 1874
San Anselmo	Town	Marin	12,830	12,336	+4.0%	2.68 sq mi (6.9 km^{2})	4,787.3/sq mi (1,848.4/km^{2})	April 9, 1907
San Bernardino†	City	San Bernardino	222,101	209,924	+5.8%	62.13 sq mi (160.9 km^{2})	3,574.8/sq mi (1,380.2/km^{2})	August 10, 1869
San Bruno	City	San Mateo	43,908	41,114	+6.8%	5.49 sq mi (14.2 km^{2})	7,997.8/sq mi (3,088.0/km^{2})	December 23, 1914
San Carlos	City	San Mateo	30,722	28,406	+8.2%	5.41 sq mi (14.0 km^{2})	5,678.7/sq mi (2,192.6/km^{2})	July 8, 1925
San Clemente	City	Orange	64,293	63,522	+1.2%	18.36 sq mi (47.6 km^{2})	3,501.8/sq mi (1,352.1/km^{2})	February 28, 1928
San Diego†	City	San Diego	1,386,932	1,307,402	+6.1%	325.88 sq mi (844.0 km^{2})	4,256.0/sq mi (1,643.2/km^{2})	March 27, 1850
San Dimas	City	Los Angeles	34,924	33,371	+4.7%	15.03 sq mi (38.9 km^{2})	2,323.6/sq mi (897.2/km^{2})	August 4, 1960
San Fernando	City	Los Angeles	23,946	23,645	+1.3%	2.37 sq mi (6.1 km^{2})	10,103.8/sq mi (3,901.1/km^{2})	August 31, 1911
San Francisco†	City and county	San Francisco	873,965	805,235	+8.5%	46.91 sq mi (121.5 km^{2})	18,630.7/sq mi (7,193.3/km^{2})	April 15, 1850
San Gabriel	City	Los Angeles	39,568	39,718	−0.4%	4.14 sq mi (10.7 km^{2})	9,557.5/sq mi (3,690.2/km^{2})	April 24, 1913
San Jacinto	City	Riverside	53,898	44,199	+21.9%	25.96 sq mi (67.2 km^{2})	2,076.2/sq mi (801.6/km^{2})	April 20, 1888
San Joaquin	City	Fresno	3,701	4,001	−7.5%	1.20 sq mi (3.1 km^{2})	3,084.2/sq mi (1,190.8/km^{2})	February 14, 1920
San Jose†	City	Santa Clara	1,013,240	945,942	+7.1%	178.26 sq mi (461.7 km^{2})	5,684.1/sq mi (2,194.6/km^{2})	March 27, 1850
San Juan Bautista	City	San Benito	2,089	1,862	+12.2%	0.79 sq mi (2.0 km^{2})	2,644.3/sq mi (1,021.0/km^{2})	May 4, 1896
San Juan Capistrano	City	Orange	35,196	34,593	+1.7%	14.43 sq mi (37.4 km^{2})	2,439.1/sq mi (941.7/km^{2})	April 19, 1961
San Leandro	City	Alameda	91,008	84,950	+7.1%	13.32 sq mi (34.5 km^{2})	6,832.4/sq mi (2,638.0/km^{2})	March 21, 1872
San Luis Obispo†	City	San Luis Obispo	47,063	45,119	+4.3%	13.31 sq mi (34.5 km^{2})	3,535.9/sq mi (1,365.2/km^{2})	February 16, 1856
San Marcos	City	San Diego	94,833	83,781	+13.2%	24.36 sq mi (63.1 km^{2})	3,893.0/sq mi (1,503.1/km^{2})	January 28, 1963
San Marino	City	Los Angeles	12,513	13,147	−4.8%	3.77 sq mi (9.8 km^{2})	3,319.1/sq mi (1,281.5/km^{2})	April 25, 1913
San Mateo	City	San Mateo	105,661	97,207	+8.7%	12.13 sq mi (31.4 km^{2})	8,702.5/sq mi (3,360.0/km^{2})	September 4, 1894
San Pablo	City	Contra Costa	32,127	29,139	+10.3%	2.62 sq mi (6.8 km^{2})	12,262.2/sq mi (4,734.5/km^{2})	April 27, 1948
San Rafael†	City	Marin	61,271	57,713	+6.2%	16.59 sq mi (43.0 km^{2})	3,693.2/sq mi (1,426.0/km^{2})	February 18, 1874
San Ramon	City	Contra Costa	84,605	72,148	+17.3%	18.69 sq mi (48.4 km^{2})	4,526.8/sq mi (1,747.8/km^{2})	July 1, 1983
Sand City	City	Monterey	325	334	−2.7%	0.55 sq mi (1.4 km^{2})	590.9/sq mi (228.2/km^{2})	May 31, 1960
Sanger	City	Fresno	26,617	24,270	+9.7%	5.77 sq mi (14.9 km^{2})	4,613.0/sq mi (1,781.1/km^{2})	May 9, 1911
Santa Ana†	City	Orange	310,227	324,528	−4.4%	27.34 sq mi (70.8 km^{2})	11,347.0/sq mi (4,381.1/km^{2})	June 1, 1886
Santa Barbara†	City	Santa Barbara	88,665	88,410	+0.3%	19.51 sq mi (50.5 km^{2})	4,544.6/sq mi (1,754.7/km^{2})	April 9, 1850
Santa Clara	City	Santa Clara	127,647	116,468	+9.6%	18.28 sq mi (47.3 km^{2})	6,982.9/sq mi (2,696.1/km^{2})	July 5, 1852
Santa Clarita	City	Los Angeles	228,673	176,320	+29.7%	70.75 sq mi (183.2 km^{2})	3,232.1/sq mi (1,247.9/km^{2})	December 15, 1987
Santa Cruz†	City	Santa Cruz	62,956	59,946	+5.0%	12.74 sq mi (33.0 km^{2})	4,941.6/sq mi (1,908.0/km^{2})	March 31, 1866
Santa Fe Springs	City	Los Angeles	19,219	16,223	+18.5%	8.86 sq mi (22.9 km^{2})	2,169.2/sq mi (837.5/km^{2})	May 15, 1957
Santa Maria	City	Santa Barbara	109,707	99,553	+10.2%	22.81 sq mi (59.1 km^{2})	4,809.6/sq mi (1,857.0/km^{2})	September 12, 1905
Santa Monica	City	Los Angeles	93,076	89,736	+3.7%	8.41 sq mi (21.8 km^{2})	11,067.3/sq mi (4,273.1/km^{2})	November 30, 1886
Santa Paula	City	Ventura	30,657	29,321	+4.6%	5.53 sq mi (14.3 km^{2})	5,543.8/sq mi (2,140.5/km^{2})	April 22, 1902
Santa Rosa†	City	Sonoma	178,127	167,815	+6.1%	42.53 sq mi (110.2 km^{2})	4,188.3/sq mi (1,617.1/km^{2})	March 26, 1868
Santee	City	San Diego	60,037	53,413	+12.4%	16.54 sq mi (42.8 km^{2})	3,629.8/sq mi (1,401.5/km^{2})	December 1, 1980
Saratoga	City	Santa Clara	31,051	29,926	+3.8%	12.78 sq mi (33.1 km^{2})	2,429.7/sq mi (938.1/km^{2})	October 22, 1956
Sausalito	City	Marin	7,269	7,061	+2.9%	1.76 sq mi (4.6 km^{2})	4,130.1/sq mi (1,594.6/km^{2})	September 4, 1893
Scotts Valley	City	Santa Cruz	12,224	11,580	+5.6%	4.62 sq mi (12.0 km^{2})	2,645.9/sq mi (1,021.6/km^{2})	August 2, 1966
Seal Beach	City	Orange	25,242	24,168	+4.4%	11.27 sq mi (29.2 km^{2})	2,239.8/sq mi (864.8/km^{2})	October 27, 1915
Seaside	City	Monterey	32,366	33,025	−2.0%	8.92 sq mi (23.1 km^{2})	3,628.5/sq mi (1,401.0/km^{2})	October 13, 1954
Sebastopol	City	Sonoma	7,521	7,379	+1.9%	1.88 sq mi (4.9 km^{2})	4,000.5/sq mi (1,544.6/km^{2})	June 13, 1902
Selma	City	Fresno	24,674	23,219	+6.3%	5.81 sq mi (15.0 km^{2})	4,246.8/sq mi (1,639.7/km^{2})	March 15, 1893
Shafter	City	Kern	19,953	16,988	+17.5%	38.70 sq mi (100.2 km^{2})	515.6/sq mi (199.1/km^{2})	January 20, 1938
Shasta Lake	City	Shasta	10,371	10,164	+2.0%	10.92 sq mi (28.3 km^{2})	949.7/sq mi (366.7/km^{2})	July 2, 1993
Sierra Madre	City	Los Angeles	11,268	10,917	+3.2%	2.95 sq mi (7.6 km^{2})	3,819.7/sq mi (1,474.8/km^{2})	February 2, 1907
Signal Hill	City	Los Angeles	11,848	11,016	+7.6%	2.19 sq mi (5.7 km^{2})	5,410.0/sq mi (2,088.8/km^{2})	April 22, 1924
Simi Valley	City	Ventura	126,356	124,237	+1.7%	41.55 sq mi (107.6 km^{2})	3,041.1/sq mi (1,174.2/km^{2})	October 10, 1969
Solana Beach	City	San Diego	12,941	12,867	+0.6%	3.41 sq mi (8.8 km^{2})	3,795.0/sq mi (1,465.3/km^{2})	July 1, 1986
Soledad	City	Monterey	24,925	25,738	−3.2%	4.46 sq mi (11.6 km^{2})	5,588.6/sq mi (2,157.8/km^{2})	March 9, 1921
Solvang	City	Santa Barbara	6,126	5,245	+16.8%	2.43 sq mi (6.3 km^{2})	2,521.0/sq mi (973.4/km^{2})	May 1, 1985
Sonoma	City	Sonoma	10,739	10,648	+0.9%	2.74 sq mi (7.1 km^{2})	3,919.3/sq mi (1,513.3/km^{2})	September 3, 1883
Sonora†	City	Tuolumne	5,003	4,903	+2.0%	3.16 sq mi (8.2 km^{2})	1,583.2/sq mi (611.3/km^{2})	May 1, 1851
South El Monte	City	Los Angeles	19,567	20,116	−2.7%	2.84 sq mi (7.4 km^{2})	6,889.8/sq mi (2,660.2/km^{2})	July 30, 1958
South Gate	City	Los Angeles	92,726	94,396	−1.8%	7.24 sq mi (18.8 km^{2})	12,807.5/sq mi (4,945.0/km^{2})	January 20, 1923
South Lake Tahoe	City	El Dorado	21,330	21,403	−0.3%	10.19 sq mi (26.4 km^{2})	2,093.2/sq mi (808.2/km^{2})	November 30, 1965
South Pasadena	City	Los Angeles	26,943	25,619	+5.2%	3.41 sq mi (8.8 km^{2})	7,901.2/sq mi (3,050.7/km^{2})	March 2, 1888
South San Francisco	City	San Mateo	66,105	63,632	+3.9%	9.20 sq mi (23.8 km^{2})	7,185.3/sq mi (2,774.3/km^{2})	September 19, 1908
Stanton	City	Orange	37,962	38,186	−0.6%	3.10 sq mi (8.0 km^{2})	12,245.8/sq mi (4,728.1/km^{2})	June 4, 1956
Stockton†	City	San Joaquin	320,804	291,707	+10.0%	62.21 sq mi (161.1 km^{2})	5,156.8/sq mi (1,991.0/km^{2})	July 23, 1850
Suisun City	City	Solano	29,518	28,111	+5.0%	4.01 sq mi (10.4 km^{2})	7,361.1/sq mi (2,842.1/km^{2})	October 9, 1868
Sunnyvale	City	Santa Clara	155,805	140,081	+11.2%	22.06 sq mi (57.1 km^{2})	7,062.8/sq mi (2,727.0/km^{2})	December 24, 1912
Susanville†	City	Lassen	16,728	17,947	−6.8%	7.92 sq mi (20.5 km^{2})	2,112.1/sq mi (815.5/km^{2})	August 24, 1900
Sutter Creek	City	Amador	2,646	2,501	+5.8%	2.70 sq mi (7.0 km^{2})	980.0/sq mi (378.4/km^{2})	February 11, 1913
Taft	City	Kern	8,546	9,327	−8.4%	15.27 sq mi (39.5 km^{2})	559.7/sq mi (216.1/km^{2})	November 7, 1910
Tehachapi	City	Kern	12,939	14,414	−10.2%	10.26 sq mi (26.6 km^{2})	1,261.1/sq mi (486.9/km^{2})	August 13, 1909
Tehama	City	Tehama	435	418	+4.1%	0.79 sq mi (2.0 km^{2})	550.6/sq mi (212.6/km^{2})	July 5, 1906
Temecula	City	Riverside	110,003	100,097	+9.9%	37.27 sq mi (96.5 km^{2})	2,951.5/sq mi (1,139.6/km^{2})	December 1, 1989
Temple City	City	Los Angeles	36,494	35,558	+2.6%	4.00 sq mi (10.4 km^{2})	9,123.5/sq mi (3,522.6/km^{2})	May 25, 1960
Thousand Oaks	City	Ventura	126,966	126,683	+0.2%	55.26 sq mi (143.1 km^{2})	2,297.6/sq mi (887.1/km^{2})	October 7, 1964
Tiburon	Town	Marin	9,146	8,962	+2.1%	4.48 sq mi (11.6 km^{2})	2,041.5/sq mi (788.2/km^{2})	June 23, 1964
Torrance	City	Los Angeles	147,067	145,538	+1.1%	20.52 sq mi (53.1 km^{2})	7,167.0/sq mi (2,767.2/km^{2})	May 21, 1921
Tracy	City	San Joaquin	93,000	82,922	+12.2%	25.89 sq mi (67.1 km^{2})	3,592.1/sq mi (1,386.9/km^{2})	July 22, 1910
Trinidad	City	Humboldt	307	367	−16.3%	0.49 sq mi (1.3 km^{2})	626.5/sq mi (241.9/km^{2})	November 7, 1870
Truckee	Town	Nevada	16,729	16,180	+3.4%	32.33 sq mi (83.7 km^{2})	517.4/sq mi (199.8/km^{2})	March 23, 1993
Tulare	City	Tulare	68,875	59,278	+16.2%	20.39 sq mi (52.8 km^{2})	3,377.9/sq mi (1,304.2/km^{2})	April 5, 1888
Tulelake	City	Siskiyou	902	1,010	−10.7%	0.41 sq mi (1.1 km^{2})	2,200.0/sq mi (849.4/km^{2})	March 1, 1937
Turlock	City	Stanislaus	72,740	68,549	+6.1%	16.91 sq mi (43.8 km^{2})	4,301.6/sq mi (1,660.9/km^{2})	February 15, 1908
Tustin	City	Orange	80,276	75,540	+6.3%	11.16 sq mi (28.9 km^{2})	7,193.2/sq mi (2,777.3/km^{2})	September 21, 1927
Twentynine Palms	City	San Bernardino	28,065	25,048	+12.0%	58.75 sq mi (152.2 km^{2})	477.7/sq mi (184.4/km^{2})	November 23, 1987
Ukiah†	City	Mendocino	16,607	16,075	+3.3%	4.78 sq mi (12.4 km^{2})	3,474.3/sq mi (1,341.4/km^{2})	March 8, 1876
Union City	City	Alameda	70,143	69,516	+0.9%	19.18 sq mi (49.7 km^{2})	3,657.1/sq mi (1,412.0/km^{2})	January 26, 1959
Upland	City	San Bernardino	79,040	73,732	+7.2%	15.58 sq mi (40.4 km^{2})	5,073.2/sq mi (1,958.8/km^{2})	May 15, 1906
Vacaville	City	Solano	102,386	92,428	+10.8%	29.87 sq mi (77.4 km^{2})	3,427.7/sq mi (1,323.5/km^{2})	August 9, 1892
Vallejo	City	Solano	126,090	115,942	+8.8%	30.42 sq mi (78.8 km^{2})	4,145.0/sq mi (1,600.4/km^{2})	March 30, 1868
Ventura†	City	Ventura	110,763	106,433	+4.1%	21.89 sq mi (56.7 km^{2})	5,060.0/sq mi (1,953.7/km^{2})	April 2, 1866
Vernon	City	Los Angeles	222	112	+98.2%	4.98 sq mi (12.9 km^{2})	44.6/sq mi (17.2/km^{2})	September 22, 1905
Victorville	City	San Bernardino	134,810	115,903	+16.3%	73.71 sq mi (190.9 km^{2})	1,828.9/sq mi (706.2/km^{2})	September 21, 1962
Villa Park	City	Orange	5,843	5,812	+0.5%	2.08 sq mi (5.4 km^{2})	2,809.1/sq mi (1,084.6/km^{2})	January 11, 1962
Visalia†	City	Tulare	141,384	124,442	+13.6%	37.94 sq mi (98.3 km^{2})	3,726.5/sq mi (1,438.8/km^{2})	February 27, 1874
Vista	City	San Diego	98,381	93,834	+4.8%	18.75 sq mi (48.6 km^{2})	5,247.0/sq mi (2,025.9/km^{2})	January 28, 1963
Walnut	City	Los Angeles	28,430	29,172	−2.5%	8.99 sq mi (23.3 km^{2})	3,162.4/sq mi (1,221.0/km^{2})	January 19, 1959
Walnut Creek	City	Contra Costa	70,127	64,173	+9.3%	19.76 sq mi (51.2 km^{2})	3,548.9/sq mi (1,370.3/km^{2})	October 21, 1914
Wasco	City	Kern	27,047	25,545	+5.9%	9.39 sq mi (24.3 km^{2})	2,880.4/sq mi (1,112.1/km^{2})	December 22, 1945
Waterford	City	Stanislaus	9,120	8,456	+7.9%	2.36 sq mi (6.1 km^{2})	3,864.4/sq mi (1,492.1/km^{2})	November 7, 1969
Watsonville	City	Santa Cruz	52,590	51,199	+2.7%	6.71 sq mi (17.4 km^{2})	7,837.6/sq mi (3,026.1/km^{2})	March 30, 1868
Weed	City	Siskiyou	2,862	2,967	−3.5%	4.82 sq mi (12.5 km^{2})	593.8/sq mi (229.3/km^{2})	January 25, 1961
West Covina	City	Los Angeles	109,501	106,098	+3.2%	16.04 sq mi (41.5 km^{2})	6,826.7/sq mi (2,635.8/km^{2})	February 17, 1923
West Hollywood	City	Los Angeles	35,757	34,399	+3.9%	1.89 sq mi (4.9 km^{2})	18,919.0/sq mi (7,304.7/km^{2})	November 29, 1984
West Sacramento	City	Yolo	53,915	48,744	+10.6%	21.47 sq mi (55.6 km^{2})	2,511.2/sq mi (969.6/km^{2})	January 1, 1987
Westlake Village	City	Los Angeles	8,029	8,270	−2.9%	5.19 sq mi (13.4 km^{2})	1,547.0/sq mi (597.3/km^{2})	December 11, 1981
Westminster	City	Orange	90,911	89,701	+1.3%	10.04 sq mi (26.0 km^{2})	9,054.9/sq mi (3,496.1/km^{2})	March 27, 1957
Westmorland	City	Imperial	2,014	2,225	−9.5%	0.59 sq mi (1.5 km^{2})	3,413.6/sq mi (1,318.0/km^{2})	June 30, 1934
Wheatland	City	Yuba	3,712	3,456	+7.4%	8.12 sq mi (21.0 km^{2})	457.1/sq mi (176.5/km^{2})	April 23, 1874
Whittier	City	Los Angeles	87,306	85,331	+2.3%	14.65 sq mi (37.9 km^{2})	5,959.5/sq mi (2,301.0/km^{2})	February 25, 1898
Wildomar	City	Riverside	36,875	32,176	+14.6%	23.70 sq mi (61.4 km^{2})	1,555.9/sq mi (600.7/km^{2})	July 1, 2008
Williams	City	Colusa	5,538	5,123	+8.1%	4.95 sq mi (12.8 km^{2})	1,118.8/sq mi (432.0/km^{2})	May 17, 1920
Willits	City	Mendocino	4,988	4,888	+2.0%	2.82 sq mi (7.3 km^{2})	1,768.8/sq mi (682.9/km^{2})	November 19, 1888
Willows†	City	Glenn	6,293	6,166	+2.1%	2.84 sq mi (7.4 km^{2})	2,215.8/sq mi (855.5/km^{2})	January 16, 1886
Windsor	Town	Sonoma	26,344	26,801	−1.7%	7.44 sq mi (19.3 km^{2})	3,540.9/sq mi (1,367.1/km^{2})	July 1, 1992
Winters	City	Yolo	7,115	6,624	+7.4%	2.94 sq mi (7.6 km^{2})	2,420.1/sq mi (934.4/km^{2})	February 9, 1898
Woodlake	City	Tulare	7,419	7,279	+1.9%	2.61 sq mi (6.8 km^{2})	2,842.5/sq mi (1,097.5/km^{2})	September 23, 1941
Woodland†	City	Yolo	61,032	55,468	+10.0%	15.32 sq mi (39.7 km^{2})	3,983.8/sq mi (1,538.2/km^{2})	February 22, 1871
Woodside	Town	San Mateo	5,309	5,287	+0.4%	11.47 sq mi (29.7 km^{2})	462.9/sq mi (178.7/km^{2})	November 16, 1956
Yorba Linda	City	Orange	68,336	64,234	+6.4%	19.95 sq mi (51.7 km^{2})	3,425.4/sq mi (1,322.5/km^{2})	November 2, 1967
Yountville	Town	Napa	3,436	2,933	+17.1%	1.49 sq mi (3.9 km^{2})	2,306.0/sq mi (890.4/km^{2})	February 4, 1965
Yreka†	City	Siskiyou	7,807	7,765	+0.5%	9.99 sq mi (25.9 km^{2})	781.5/sq mi (301.7/km^{2})	April 21, 1857
Yuba City†	City	Sutter	70,117	64,925	+8.0%	14.98 sq mi (38.8 km^{2})	4,680.7/sq mi (1,807.2/km^{2})	January 23, 1908
Yucaipa	City	San Bernardino	54,542	51,367	+6.2%	28.27 sq mi (73.2 km^{2})	1,929.3/sq mi (744.9/km^{2})	November 27, 1989
Yucca Valley	Town	San Bernardino	21,738	20,700	+5.0%	39.83 sq mi (103.2 km^{2})	545.8/sq mi (210.7/km^{2})	November 27, 1991

== See also ==
- List of cities in Los Angeles County, California
- List of cities and towns in the San Francisco Bay Area
- List of places in California
- List of counties in California
- List of largest cities in California by population
