= Imperial Hotel (California) =

Bed and breakfast in California

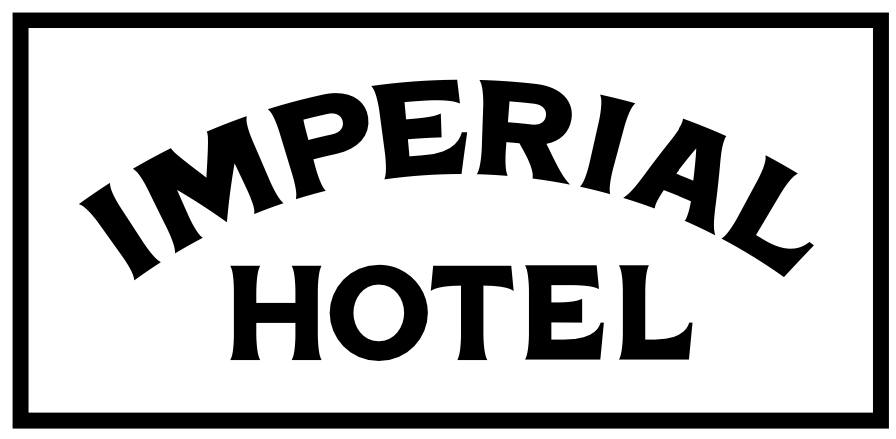
- Logo

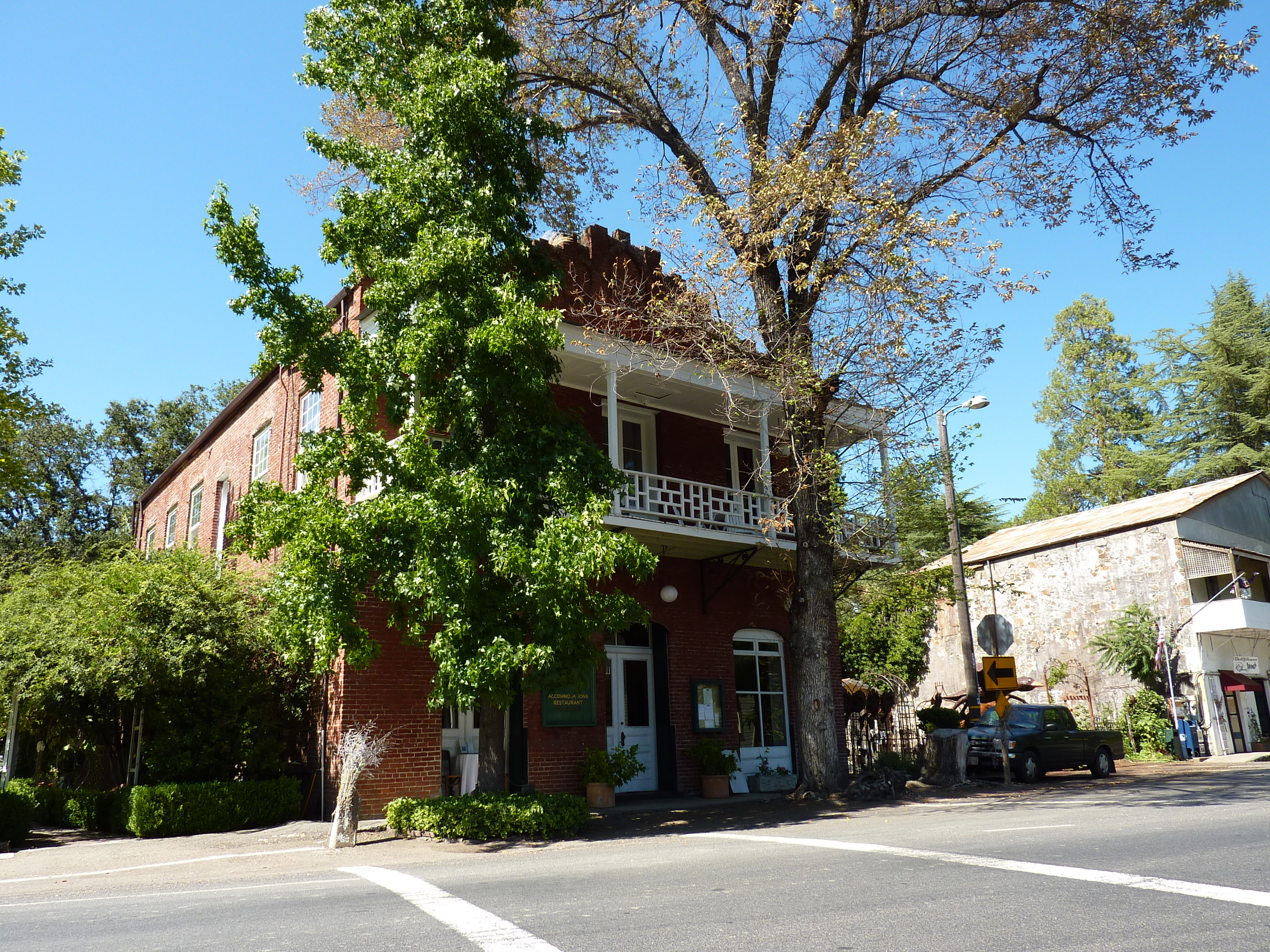
- Interactive map of the Imperial Hotel area

General information
- Location: Amador City, California, United States, 14202 Old Hwy 49
- Coordinates: 38°25′9.71″N 120°49′29.23″W
- Opening: 1879
- Owner: McCamant Family

Technical details
- Floor count: 2

Other information
- Number of rooms: 6
- Number of suites: 3
- Number of restaurants: 1

Website
- Official website

The Imperial Hotel & Restaurant is a bed and breakfast located in Amador City, California in the United States.

== History ==
The Imperial Hotel was founded in 1879 by the Sanguinetti family. It was first a store, before B. Sanguinetti made it into a hotel. It was originally named the Italian Hotel, and was later renamed to the Ben White Hotel. Its main clientele was people visiting as part of the California Gold Rush, specifically wealthy miners. The building had two stories, with the hotel upstairs and the restaurant and bar on the ground floor. Eventually, an extension was built for more hotel rooms in the back. The building fell into disuse by 1927. It was sold and renovated in 1968.

The building was bought by Dale Martin and Bruce Sherrill in 1988, who made it into a bed and breakfast. In 2006, the Imperial was bought by the McCamant family, who own and operate the Imperial Hotel as a bed and breakfast today.

== Facilities ==
The hotel is two stories and is made out of stone and brick. The walls "are twelve bricks thick at its base and four bricks thick at the roof." The layout remains the same as it did historically: guest rooms are upstairs and on the ground floor is the restaurant and bar. The area that served as guest rooms in the back on the ground floor now serves as a patio for dining. The restaurant specializes in California cuisine made from local and sustainable farmers and producers. It sits 55 people. The bar is called the Oasis. Guests can stay at the main building, or at a property on another part of town in an area called God's Hill. That property was owned by the former foreman of Keystone Mine. The God's Hill house has larger rooms than the original inn. There is a library on site offering guests books and magazines. The hotel is primarily decorated in Victorian era antiques. A bridge replacement project completed in 2014 has beautified and revitalized the center of the city, providing patio dining at the Imperial Hotel.
