= Amador City, California =

City in California, United States

- City
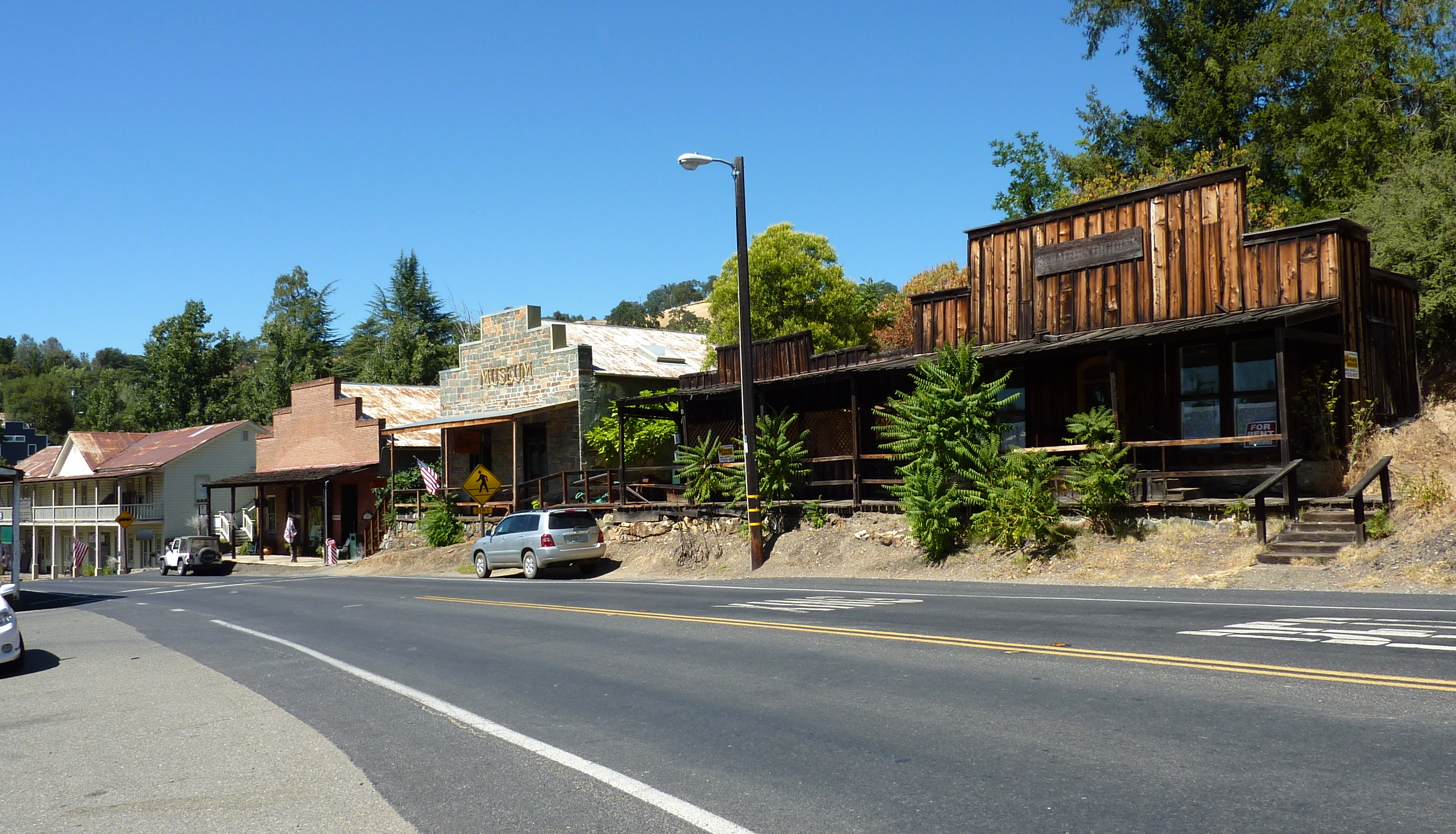
- Historic buildings in Amador City

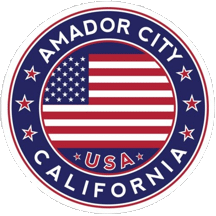
- Seal
- Nickname: The gold country's hidden nugget
- Motto: "Essence of the California Gold & Wine Country"
- Interactive map of Amador City, California
- Location in California Amador City, California (the United States)
- Coordinates: 38°25′10″N 120°49′27″W
- Country: United States
- State: California
- County: Amador
- Incorporated: June 2, 1915

Government
  - Mayor: Sandra Staples
  - State Senate: Marie Alvarado-Gil (R)
  - State Assembly: Heather Hadwick (R)
  - U. S. Congress: Tom McClintock (R)

Area
  - Total: 0.31 sq mi (0.80 km^{2})
  - Land: 0.31 sq mi (0.80 km^{2})
  - Water: 0 sq mi (0.00 km^{2}) 0%
- Elevation: 920 ft (280 m)

Population (2020)
  - Total: 200
  - Density: 646.1/sq mi (249.46/km^{2})
- Time zone: UTC-8 (PST)
  - Summer (DST): UTC-7 (PDT)
- ZIP code: 95601
- Area code: 209
- FIPS code: 06-01514
- GNIS feature IDs: 1657922, 2409693
- Website: amador-city.com

Amador City (formerly Amadore's Creek or South Amador) is a city in Amador County, California, United States. The population was 200 as of the 2020 census, up from 185 in 2010, making it the least populous city in California. Amador City is noted for being the smallest city in the state by area, covering just 0.3 square miles in total. The current mayor is Sandra Staples.

== Geography ==
Only two miles (3.2 km) from Sutter Creek on Old Highway 49, Amador City is the state's smallest incorporated city by area. According to the United States Census Bureau, the city has a total area of 0.3 square miles (0.78 km^{2}), all land, making it the smallest city in California by size.

== History ==
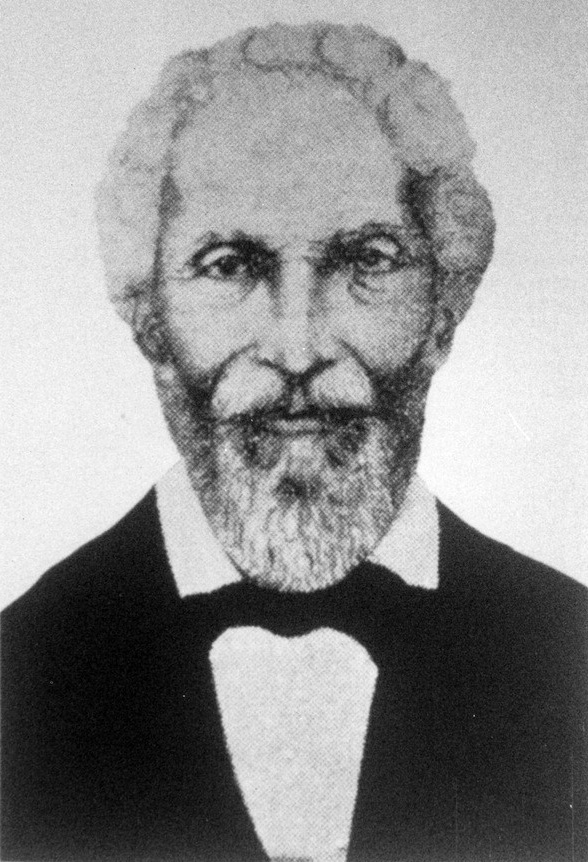
Amador City is named after José María Amador, a Californio miner who found gold in the area in 1848.

Amador City was originally settled in 1849 at what is now Turner Road and Amador Creek (an old wagon road between Drytown and Sutter Creek) by several groups of gold panners who were drawn to the area. One of these was the Sunol Group, which included José María Amador. He panned the creek, but his primary success was in providing supplies that he brought from his rancheria in the San Ramon area. The creek, city and county eventually carried the name "Amador", the city taking its name from the county.

Early in 1851, gold quartz veins were discovered along the same creek, further west. Arrastras were brought to the area to crush the quartz. Soon, stamp mills were brought in to process the hard quartz that the gold veins were embedded in. By September, two stamp mills were erected along Amador Creek. These mills were so remarkable that they drew the attention of Eadweard Muybridge. He photographed the area, and 3D images taken in 1851 were made of the stamp mills.

Amador City was incorporated as a city on June 2, 1915.

== Demographics ==
Historical population
Census	Pop.	Note	%±
1880	824		—
1890	984		19.4%
1920	377		—
1930	171		−54.6%
1940	249		45.6%
1950	151		−39.4%
1960	202		33.8%
1970	156		−22.8%
1980	136		−12.8%
1990	196		44.1%
2000	196		0.0%
2010	185		−5.6%
2020	200		8.1%
U.S. Decennial Census

=== 2020 census ===
As of the 2020 census, Amador City had a population of 200. The population density was 645.2 inhabitants per square mile (249.1/km^{2}). The median age was 46.5 years. 15.5% of residents were under the age of 18, 6.0% were aged 18 to 24, 28.0% were aged 25 to 44, 21.5% were aged 45 to 64, and 29.0% of residents were 65 years of age or older. For every 100 females there were 92.3 males, and for every 100 females age 18 and over there were 92.0 males age 18 and over.

76.5% of residents lived in urban areas, while 23.5% lived in rural areas.

There were 95 households in Amador City, of which 29.5% had children under the age of 18 living in them. Of all households, 38.9% were married-couple households, 8.4% were cohabiting couple households, 20.0% were households with a male householder and no spouse or partner present, and 32.6% were households with a female householder and no spouse or partner present. About 29.4% of all households were made up of individuals and 12.6% had someone living alone who was 65 years of age or older. The average household size was 2.11. There were 61 families (64.2% of all households).

There were 119 housing units at an average density of 383.9 units per square mile (148.2 units/km^{2}), of which 95 (79.8%) were occupied. Of these, 54.7% were owner-occupied and 45.3% were occupied by renters. The homeowner vacancy rate was 7.1% and the rental vacancy rate was 10.4%.

Racial composition as of the 2020 census
Race	Number	Percent
White	162	81.0%
Black or African American	1	0.5%
American Indian and Alaska Native	4	2.0%
Asian	1	0.5%
Native Hawaiian and Other Pacific Islander	0	0.0%
Some other race	6	3.0%
Two or more races	26	13.0%
Hispanic or Latino (of any race)	21	10.5%

== Government and politics ==
In the California State Legislature, Amador City is in the 4th senatorial district, represented by Republican Marie Alvarado-Gil, and in the 1st Assembly district, represented by Republican Heather Hadwick.

In the United States House of Representatives, Amador City is in California's 5th congressional district, represented by Republican Tom McClintock.

== Education ==
Amador City is within the sole school district in Amador County: Amador County Unified School District.

There are currently no schools within Amador City's boundaries. The city is served by Amador High School, Ione Junior High and Sutter Creek Elementary.

== Points of interest ==
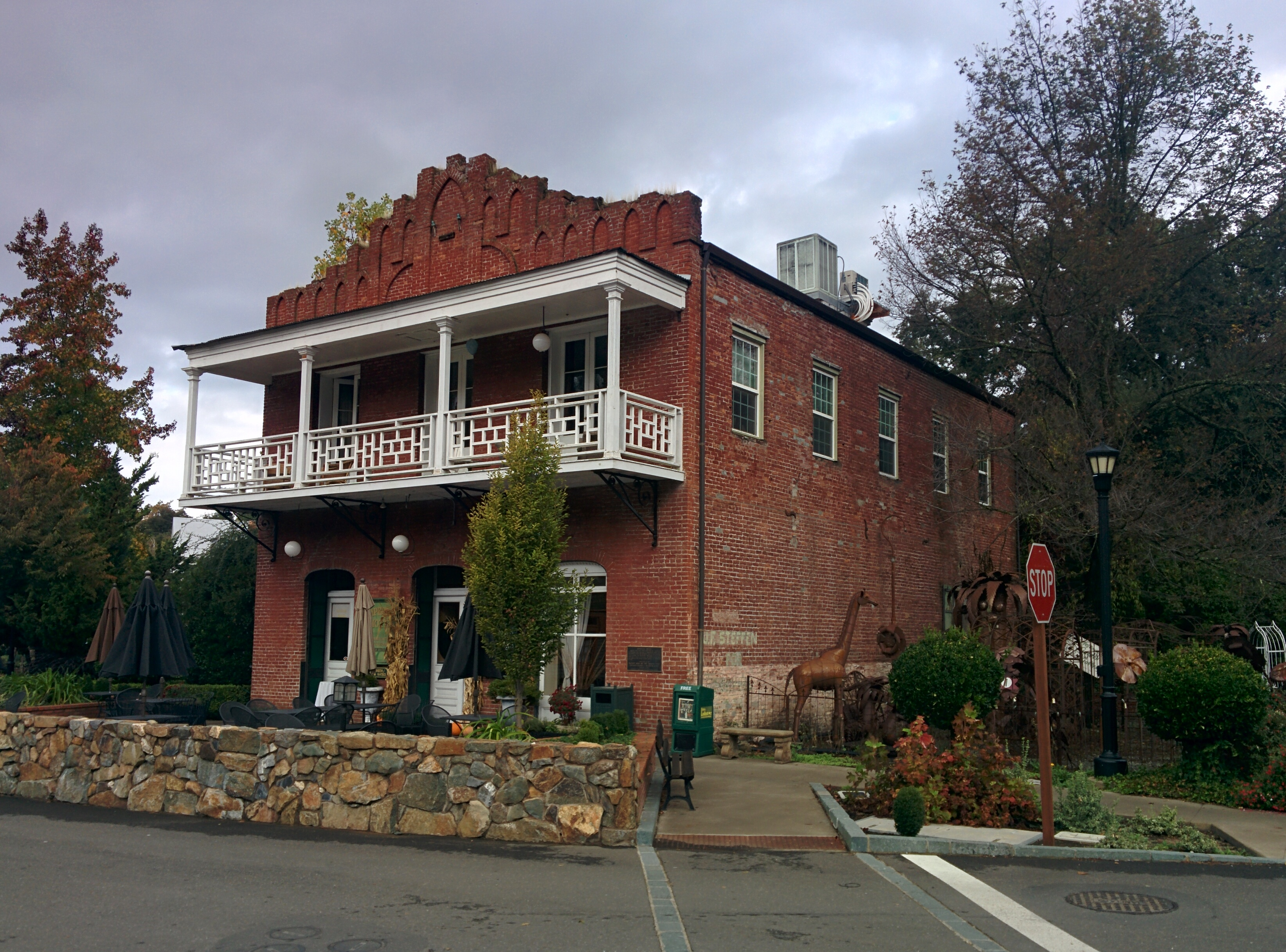
The Imperial Hotel

On Main Street is the old Imperial Hotel, an example of historic Californian brickwork.

A bridge replacement project completed in 2014 has beautified and revitalized the center of the city, providing patio dining at the Imperial Hotel, new public restrooms and improved access to the businesses in the area.

- Little Amador Railroad — Remnants remain of an incredibly detailed G-scale model train set in a garden that featured miniature mines and mills and turn-of-the-century full-size mining equipment. It is currently unused.
- Amador City Cemetery — located behind the Imperial Hotel. Visitors can take a self-guided tour of the 1.25-acre (5,100 m^{2}) cemetery that dates back to the beginning of the town.
- Amador Whitney Museum — Located in one of the oldest commercial buildings in town, dating back 1860, the museum collects and displays items related to history and culture of the Mother Lode region. The museum is named after Whitney, an antique dealer who bequeathed the building to the city of Amador to be used as a museum.
