= Imperial =

Imperial is that which relates to an empire, emperor/empress, or imperialism.

Imperial or The Imperial may also refer to:

== Places ==
=== United States ===
- Imperial, California
- Imperial, Missouri
- Imperial, Nebraska
- Imperial, Pennsylvania
- Imperial, Texas
- Imperial, West Virginia
- Imperial, Virginia
- Imperial County, California
- Imperial Valley, California
- Imperial Beach, California

=== Elsewhere ===
- Imperial (Madrid), an administrative neighborhood in Spain
- Imperial, Saskatchewan, a town in Canada

=== Buildings ===
- Imperial Apartments, a building in Brooklyn, New York
- Imperial City, Huế, a palace in Huế, Vietnam
- Imperial Palace (disambiguation)
- Imperial Towers, a group of lighthouses on Lake Huron, Canada
- The Imperial (Mumbai), a skyscraper apartment complex in India
- Imperial War Museum, a British military museum and organisation based in London, UK
- * Imperial War Museum Duxford, an aviation museum in Cambridgeshire, UK
- * Imperial War Museum North, a military museum in Manchester, UK

== Animals and plants ==
- Cheritra or imperial, a genus of butterfly

== Architecture, design, and fashion ==
- Imperial, a luggage case for the top of a coach
- Imperial, the top, roof or second-storey compartment of a coach or carriage, especially a stagecoach
- Imperial, a style of moustache
- Imperial staircase, a style of staircase

== Arts, entertainment, and media ==
=== Fictional entities ===
- Imperial, a megacorporation in Mutant Chronicles
- Imperial, several entities in the Galactic Empire (Star Wars)
- Imperial (Elder Scrolls), a fictional race in The Elder Scrolls series of video games

=== Games ===
- Imperial (board game), a German-style board game by Mac Gerdts

=== Literature ===
- Imperial (Vollmann book), a 2009 book by William T. Vollmann
- Imperial (comics), a story arc from New X-Men
- Imperial (2025 comic book), a Marvel comics series

=== Music ===
==== Groups and labels ====
- Imperial Records, an American record company
- Little Anthony and the Imperials, an American doo-wop vocal group
- The Imperials, a vocal group
- Imperial (band), an American metalcore band

==== Albums ====
- Imperial (Denzel Curry album), 2016
- Imperial (In Fear and Faith album), 2010
- Imperial, by Robin Guthrie, 2003
- The Imperial (The Delines album), 2019
- The Imperial (Flipmode Squad album), 1998
- Imperial, by Soen, 2021

==== Songs ====
- "Imperial", a song by Allegaeon from the 2025 album The Ossuary Lens
- "Imperial", a song by HammerFall from the 2005 album Chapter V: Unbent, Unbowed, Unbroken
- "Imperial", a song by Momus from his 2016 album Scobberlotchers
- "Imperial", a song by Rah Digga from the 2000 album Dirty Harriet
- "Imperial", a song by Strapping Young Lad from the 2005 album Alien

== Television stations ==
- TV Imperial, a television station in Boa Vista, Roraima, Brazil
- Imperial TV, a television station in Imperatriz, Maranhão, Brazil

== Brands and enterprises ==
=== Beverages and foods ===
- Imperial (beer), a Costa Rican brand of beer
- Mint imperial, a type of candy

=== Hotels ===
- Hotel Imperial, a hotel in Vienna, Austria
- Imperial Hotel (disambiguation)
- The Imperial, New Delhi, a hotel in India

=== Transportation ===
- Chrysler Imperial, a car built from 1926 to 1954 and from 1990 to 1993
- Imperial (automobile), a marque used by Chrysler 1955–1983
- Imperial (British automobile), three separate British makes of car
- Imperial (SP train), a night train of the Rock Island Rail Road and the Southern Pacific
- Imperial Limited, a night train of the Canadian Pacific Railway
- Imperial Air Cargo, a South African cargo airline
- Imperial Airlines, a United States commuter airline
- Imperial Airport, an airport in Saskatchewan, Canada
- Imperial Automobile Company, an American automaker 1908–1916

=== Other brands and enterprises ===
- Imperial (bank), a Russian commercial bank in the 1990s
- Imperial Bank Limited, a commercial bank in Kenya
- Imperial Oil, a Canadian company
- Imperial Productions, a London theatre company
- Imperial Theater (disambiguation)
- Imperial Tobacco, a British multinational company
- Imperial Typewriter Company, a British manufacturer

== Organizations ==
=== Education ===
- Imperial College London, an English university
- Imperial Academy (Ethiopia), the national academy of Ethiopia
- Imperial Valley College, an American community college in Imperial County, California

=== Government and politics ===
- Indian Civil Service, the administrative services in the Government of India during the British colonial era, also called the Imperial Civil Service

=== Sports ===
- Imperial Esports, a Brazilian esports organization
- Imperials Football Club, a defunct Australian rules football club
- Imperial Futebol Clube, a Brazilian football (soccer) club

== People ==
- Athena Imperial (born 1987), Filipina news reporter, communication researcher and beauty queen
- Barbie Imperial (born 1998), Filipina actress and model
- Carlos Eduardo Imperial (1935–1992), Brazilian actor, filmmaker, presenter, songwriter and music producer
- Carlos R. Imperial (1930–2010), Filipino politician
- Dino Imperial (born 1988), Filipino actor, club MC, model and radio disk jockey
- Francisco Imperial, 15th-century Genoese poet in Seville
- Meg Imperial (born 1993), Filipina actress

== Standards and types ==
- Imperial, a traditional paper size, 22 x 30 inches
- Imperial, a wine bottle nomenclature for a one-gallon bottle size
- Imperial purple, a reddish-purple natural dye
- Imperial units, a measurement system used in the UK and Commonwealth of Nations
- Imperial units, erroneous term used to refer to United States customary units
- Imperial, a golden coin of the Russian Empire worth 10 rubles before 1897 and 15 rubles after 1897

== See also ==
- Imperial Court (disambiguation)
- Imperial River (disambiguation)
- Imperial Seal (disambiguation)
- Imperial University (disambiguation)
