= Diocese of Budapest and Hungary =

Diocese of the Patriarchate of Moscow and All Rus'

- Budapesti-Magyar Egyházmegye
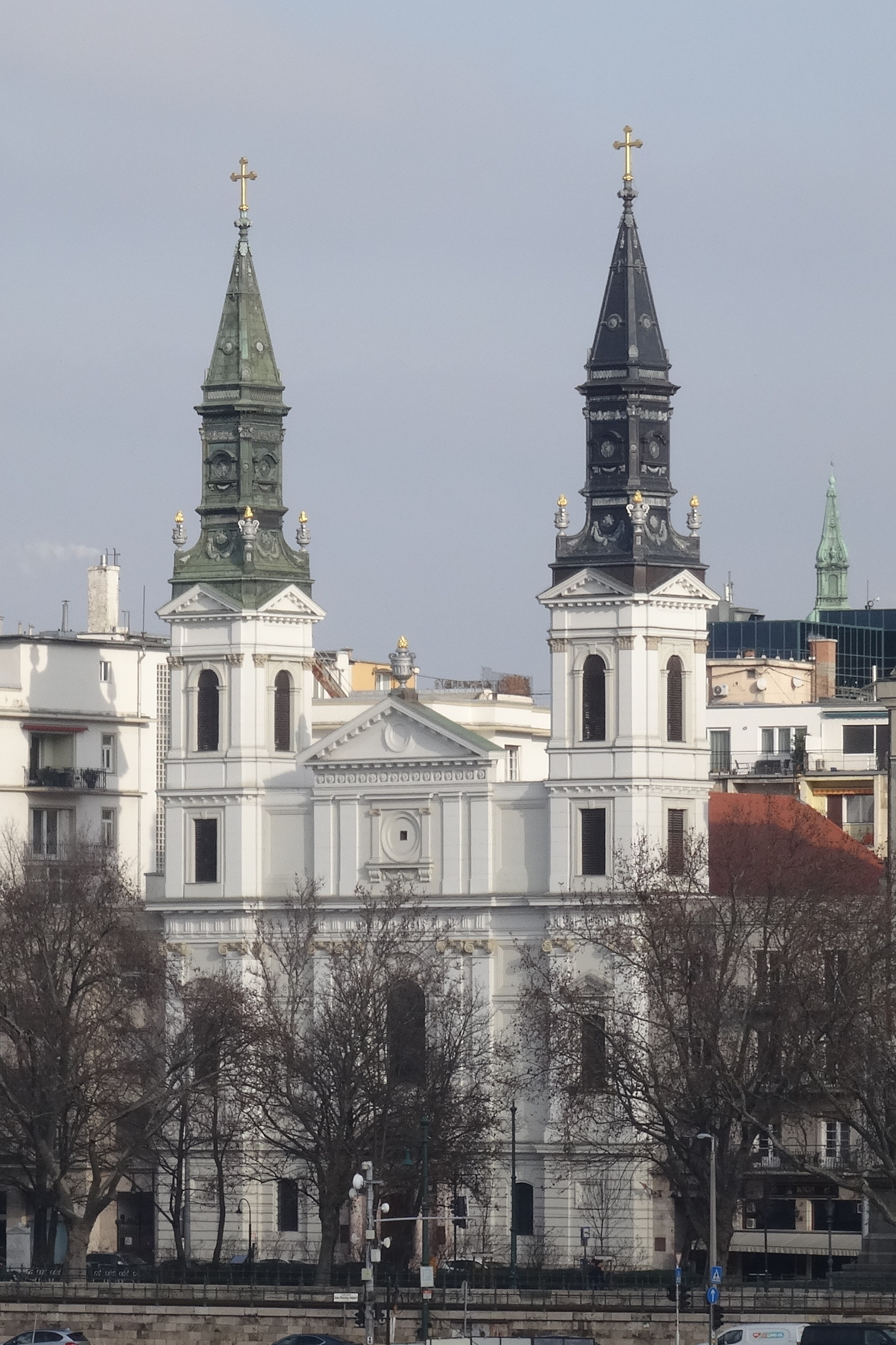
- Bishop: Mark Golovkov (locum tenens)
- Language: Church Slavonic, Hungarian
- Headquarters: Budapest
- Territory: Hungary
- Origin: April 19, 2000
- Parishes: 11
- Clergy: 14 priests + 3 deacons
- Official website: https://magyarortodox.hu

The Diocese of Budapest and Hungary (Russian: Будапештская и Венгерская епархия, Hungarian: Budapesti-Magyar Egyházmegye, also: Hungarian Orthodox Diocese, Hungarian: Magyar Orthodox Egyházmegye, or Hungarian Diocese, Hungarian: Magyar Egyházmegye) is diocese of the Russian Orthodox Church, unites parishes in Hungary.

== History ==
=== Early history ===
A Russian Orthodox church was built on the territory of Hungary in the 18th century in Tokaj, where the Russian Cossack garrison was located. On the lands leased by the Russian monarchs, the Cossacks harvested and processed grapes, which were then transported to St. Petersburg. The local church has been preserved to this day.

Another Russian church, dedicated to Martyr Alexandra, appeared in 1803 in the Budapest suburb of Üröm, on the site of the death of Grand Duchess Alexandra Pavlovna, daughter of the Emperor Paul I of Russia.

Later, the Ofen Ecclesiastical Mission was established, which operated under the diplomatic mission and registered Orthodox people living in these places. The Ofen Ecclesiastical Mission was a place of spiritual care and consolation for Russian people who found themselves in Hungary. Russian diplomats, members of the royal family, representatives of Russian culture, and politicians have repeatedly visited the church at the mission. The Ofen Mission had a good library, highly artistic expensive church utensils, the church was distinguished by the splendor of its decoration, and its staff, consisting of a priest, a deacon and four singers, allowed to lead a liturgical life and pastoral care of Eastern Orthodox believers at a decent level. Grave Russian Orthodox cemetery in Hungary with graves of clerics and choristers of the court church existed at the chapel. The mission ceased to exist after the outbreak of the First World War and the revolution in Russia.

During interwar period, refugees from former Russian Empire settled in Budapest and created two Russian parishes: one had a house church and was under the jurisdiction of the Archdiocese of Russian Orthodox Churches in Western Europe, the other did not have a permanent church and was subordinate to the Synod of Bishops of the ROCOR. These parishes ceased to exist during the Second World War.

Russian parishes came under the jurisdiction of the Moscow Patriarchate in 1945 after the war. At same time, Patriarch Alexius I of Moscow and All Russia began receiving appeals from Hungarian Orthodox parishes, which were under the jurisdiction of the Patriarchate of Karlovci before the First World War, and who sought to use the Hungarian language.

=== Hungarian Deanery ===
On November 11, 1949, by the decision of the Holy Synod of the ROC, "Hungarian Orthodox parishes that have not been under anyone's jurisdiction to date or have lost Russian jurisdiction during the war are united into the "Provisional Administration of Hungarian Orthodox Parishes"", the superior of which was appointed with the name "Dean" (administrator) Archpriest John Kopolovich; at the same time, the Hungarian Provisional Administration included: the parish of St. John Chrysostom in Budapest, the parish of the Assumption of the Mother of God in Budapest, the church in the name of the Great Martyr Queen Alexandra in Üröm, the parish in Nyíregyháza, the parish in Sarkadkeresztúr, the parish in Szentes, the parish in Szeged with the church in the name of the Great Martyr St. George the Victorious, the Russian Orthodox Church in the name of St. Sergius of Radonezh in Budapest. The spiritual care of the parishes of the Hungarian Deanery was entrusted to the DECR Chairman.

On November 15, 1949, Patriarch Alexius I approved the Regulation (Charter) on the management of parishes that are part of the Hungarian Deanery, as well as a power of attorney to resolve and implement issues of his current life. The regulation noted that the Moscow Patriarchate accepts into its jurisdiction only those parishes that ask for it, are not subordinate to the archpastoral authority of another jurisdiction and are outside canonical care; Orthodox Hungarians were granted "the right to perform all services and demands in the Hungarian language." Church of the Assumption of the Blessed Virgin Mary in Budapest became a cathedral.

From August 10 to 31, 1951, courses were organized for Hungarian clergy and clergy in order to expand their theological knowledge and strengthen their liturgical skills. New churches and parishes were opened, and the material life of parishes and clergy was improved. In 1953, two more parishes were accepted into the Hungarian Deanery and one more in 1956.

In 1952, the monthly magazine in Hungarian "Egyházi Króniká" ("Church Chronicle") was founded.

In 1954, the Holy Synod granted the request of Archpriest John Kopolovich to dismiss him from the post of dean-administrator and appointed to this position Archpriest of St. Nicholas Church in Budapest Feríz Berki, who carried this obedience until the transformation of the deanery into a diocese.

In 1987, the Hungarian Orthodox Museum was opened in a church building in the town of Miskolc.

On March 21, 1996, by the decision of the Holy Synod of the ROC, the Hungarian Deanery was removed from the direct subordination of the DECR, and its management was entrusted to Archbishop Theophan (Galinsky) of Berlin and Germany.

In 1999, the former priest of the Hungarian deanery, Christopher Khorevtos, banned from serving by Archbishop Theophan for major financial fraud and then sentenced by a secular court to imprisonment for six years, rejected three churches of the deanery (St. Nicholas Church in Szentes, St. George Church in Karcag and Trinity Church in Kecskemét) in favor of the Hungarian Exarchate of the Ecumenical Patriarchate of Constantinople, in the jurisdiction of which was accepted by himself. These actions took place with the knowledge and with the active participation of Metropolitan Michael (Staikos) of Austria, the governor of the Hungarian Exarchate.

On December 29, 1999, by the decision of the Holy Synod, the archpastoral care of the parishes of the Hungarian Deanery was entrusted to Bishop Paul (Ponomaryov), appointed to the Diocese of Vienna and Austria.

=== The Diocese of Budapest and Hungary ===
On April 19, 2000, by the decision of the Holy Synod of the ROC, the parishes of the Hungarian deanery were transformed into an independent diocese, with Archbishop Paul (Ponomaryov) received the title of "Vienna and Budapest". The number of parishioners of the Russian Orthodox Church in Hungary in 2001 amounted to 3502.

Not satisfied with the seizure of three churches, Metropolitan Michael (Staikos) of Austria tried to alienate the Assumption Cathedral in Budapest from the diocese.

On March 28, 2002, Bishop Paul signed a decree on the creation of a new parish, which became known as the Russian parish in the name of the Holy Trinity. Divine services of the new parish were celebrated and are held in the Cathedral of the Assumption of the Blessed Virgin Mary on Petőfi Square, 2, in Church Slavonic and according to the Julian Calendar

On May 7, 2003, Archbishop Paul (Ponomaryov) was transferred to the Diocese of Ryazan, and Bishop Hilarion (Alfeyev) of Vienna and Austria who also was appointed locum tenens of the Diocese of Budapest.

On September 9, 2003, the first issue of the electronic bulletin "Hungarian Orthodoxy" (Magyar ortodoxia) was published in Hungarian, prepared by the press service of the Hungarian Diocese. The purpose of the newsletter was to provide timely notification to the Hungarian media about events in the diocese, as well as to send out other useful information.

On May 18, 2004, at a meeting of the Budapest Metropolitan Court in the case of ownership of the Dormition Cathedral, the claim of the Hungarian Exarchate of the Ecumenical Patriarchate of Constantinople was rejected - the plaintiff failed to prove his right to file a claim. The trials initiated by the Hungarian Exarchate of the Patriarchate of Constantinople, widely covered by the secular media, caused serious damage to the cause of inter-Orthodox unity and the prestige of the Eastern Orthodox Church in Hungary.

On November 8, 2012, in Budapest, Deputy Prime Minister of Hungary, Zsolt Semjén, and the locum tenens of the Hungarian Diocese, Archbishop Mark (Golovkov) of Yegoryevsk, signed agreements between the Hungarian state and the Hungarian Diocese of the Russian Orthodox Church. The agreement defines the forms of cooperation in all spheres of public life.

On February 1, 2017, Hungarian prime minister Viktor Orbán signed a government decree on the allocation of a state subsidy for the restoration of the Assumption Cathedral in Budapest, the Church of the Holy Trinity in Miskolc, the church of St. Nicholas of Myra in Tokaj, as well as the construction of a new Orthodox church in Hévíz.

== Ruling hierarchs ==
- Paul Ponomaryov (April 19, 2000 — May 7, 2003)
- Hilarion Alfeyev, acting (May 7, 2003 — March 31, 2009)
- Mark Golovkov, acting (March 31, 2009 — October 22, 2015)
- Tikhon Zaitsev, acting (October 22, 2015 — December 28, 2017)
- Anthony Sevryuk (December 28, 2017 — May 30, 2019)
- John Roshchin (May 30 — August 30, 2019)
- Mark Golovkov (August 30, 2019 — June 7, 2022)
- Hilarion Alfeyev (June 7, 2022 — July 25, 2024)
- Nestor Sirotenko, acting (July 25 - December 27, 2024)
- Mark Golovkov (Since December 27, 2024)

== Parishes ==
- Cathedral of the Assumption of the Blessed Virgin Mary - Hungarian Assumption parish, Budapest
- Cathedral of the Assumption of the Blessed Virgin Mary - Russian Holy Trinity parish, Budapest
- Church of St Sergius of Radonezh, Budapest
- Church of the Holy Trinity, Miskolc
- Church of the Holy Trinity, Debrecen
- Church of Great Martyr George the Victorious, Szeged
- Church of Great Martyr George the Victorious, Nyíregyháza
- Church of the Martyr Alexandra of Rome, Üröm
- Church of st Nicholas the Wonderworker, Gyöngyös
- Church of st Nicholas the Wonderworker, Tokaj
- Parish of the Our Lady the “Life-Giving Spring", Hévíz
