= Church of Saint Nicholas, Tokaj =

Church of Saint Nicholas
- Szent Miklós-templom (Hungarian)

- Location within Hungary
- Location: Tokaj
- Country: Hungary
- Denomination: Russian Orthodox
- Website: tokaj.magyarortodox.com

Architecture
- Style: Baroque
- Years built: 1790

Administration
- Diocese: Hungarian Orthodox Diocese

The Church of Saint Nicholas (Hungarian: Szent Miklós-templom; Russian: Храм Святителя Николая) is a Russian Orthodox church in the town of Tokaj, Hungary. It is one of the oldest Orthodox churches in Hungary

== Description ==
The church stands in the center of the town. A square tower rises in the middle of the façade, beneath which is the square entrance; between the entrance and the tower, a large triangle is visible. The building has a single nave. The sanctuary is located at the eastern end and is slightly wider than the nave.

== History ==
It's parish was established at the beginning of the 18th century thanks to the famous Russian Tokaj Wine Purchasing Commission (Tokaji Borvásárló Bizottság), which operated in the town and procured Tokaji wines for the imperial court in Saint Petersburg. At that time, there was a large community of Orthodox believers living in the town and originally, they had a wooden church. In 1790, they built the Baroque church dedicated to Saint Nicholas.

By the 19th century, the parish had begun to depopulate increasingly, as merchants’ rights were severely restricted. The last Orthodox priest in Tokaj died in 1848, from that point on, the church belonged to the Orthodox parish in Miskolc. In the 1940s, the church was completely emptied, and its furnishings were moved to Nyíregyháza.

In 2017, the Hungarian government allocated significant funding for the renovation of Russian Ortohodox churches in Hungary. As part of this initiative, this church was also renovated. In 2018, the Hungarian government officially transferred ownership of the church to the Russian Orthodox Church. On August 22, 2026, it was reconsecrated.

== See also ==
- Russian Orthodox Church
- Hungarian Orthodox Diocese
- Tokaj
