= Imperial Hotel =

Imperial Hotel or Hotel Imperial may refer to:

== Hotels ==
=== Australia ===
- Imperial Hotel, Ravenswood, Queensland
- Imperial Hotel, York, Western Australia

=== Austria ===
- Hotel Imperial, Vienna

=== India ===
- The Imperial, New Delhi

=== Ireland ===
- Imperial Hotel, Dublin, destroyed during the 1916 Easter Rising

=== Japan ===
- Imperial Hotel (company), operator of a chain of hotels
  - Imperial Hotel, Tokyo

=== New Zealand ===
- Imperial Hotel, Auckland

=== Uganda ===
- Imperial Hotels Group, a hotel conglomerate

=== United Kingdom ===
- Imperial Hotel, Barrow-in-Furness, England
- Imperial Hotel, Blackpool, England
- Imperial Hotel, London, England

=== United States ===
- Imperial Hotel (Atlanta)
- Imperial Hotel (Thomasville, Georgia), historic building
- Imperial Hotel (California)
- Rockaway Beach Hotel (also called the Hotel Imperial), Rockaway Park, Queens, New York
- Imperial Hotel (Portland, Oregon)
- New Imperial Hotel (formerly the Imperial Hotel), Portland, Oregon
- Imperial Hotel (Greenville, South Carolina)

== Entertainment ==
- "Imperial Hotel" (song), from the 1986 album Rock a Little by Stevie Nicks
- Hotel Imperial (1927 film)
- Hotel Imperial (1939 film)
