= List of populated places in Hungary (Ü–Ű) =

This is a list of cities, towns and villages of Hungary

KEY: T = Town ; V = Village

Name	Rank	County	District	Population	Post code
Üllés	V	Csongrád	Mórahalmi	3,213	6794
Üllő	V	Pest	Gyáli	10,016	2225
Üröm	V	Pest	Pilisvörösvári	4,904	2096

== Notes ==
- Cities marked with * have several different post codes, the one here is only the most general one.
