= Imperial River =

Imperial River may refer to one of the following rivers:

In South America:

- Imperial River (Chile)

In the United States:

- Imperial River (Florida)

== See also ==
- Imperial (disambiguation)
