= Royal seal (disambiguation) =

A royal seal is a seal used by a monarch.

Royal seal may also refer to:

- Great Seal of the Realm, United Kingdom
- Great Seal of Scotland
- Great Seal of Northern Ireland
- Great Seal of Canada

== See also ==
- Great Seal, a seal used by a head of state
- Imperial Seal (disambiguation)
