= Imperial Productions =

London theatre company

Imperial Productions (known until 2007 as Imperial Opera) is a theatre company based in London, England. It was founded in 1979 by members of the Operatic Society of Imperial College Union, from which it remains completely independent.

The company specialises in giving exposure to rare and unusual works of opera and musical theatre. Recent productions have included Moby Dick! the musical, Moll Flanders the musical, Elegies for Angels, Punks and Raging Queens, Something's Afoot and Sweeney Todd, the Demon Barber of Fleet Street.

In 2008 they presented the world premiere of the new musical The Last Maharajah, and in 2009 the European premiere of the cult Off-Off-Broadway show SILENCE! The Musical.

They usually present shows in fringe theatres and other small venues in and around Central London, including The Barons Court Theatre, The Cockpit Theatre and Hoxton Hall. They also tour a production to Budleigh Salterton, Devon every December.
