= Imperial Hotel (Greenville, South Carolina) =

- U.S. National Register of Historic Places
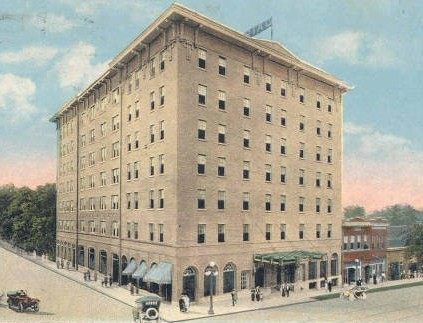
- Imperial Hotel, 1917 postcard

- Location within South Carolina Location within the United States
- Location: 201 W. Washington St., Greenville, South Carolina
- Coordinates: 34°51′5″N 82°24′7″W
- Area: 0.6 acres (0.24 ha)
- Built: 1911-1912
- Built by: Cunningham, F.H. & J.G.; Jordan, W.M.
- Architectural style: Chicago, The Commercial Style
- MPS: Greenville MRA
- NRHP reference No.: 85002167
- Added to NRHP: September 12, 1985

Imperial Hotel, currently known as Greenville Summit, is a historic hotel building located at Greenville, South Carolina. It was built in 1911–1912, and is a seven-story, U-shaped skyscraper with a buff-colored brick veneer over a steel frame. It was originally a 90-room hotel, and expanded by 1930 to 250 rooms. The hotel closed in the early 1970s, but this establishment is still used as a nursing home for low income and disabled people 55 and over. An adjacent parking garage was demolished in the 1980s.

It was added to the National Register of Historic Places in 1982.

New owners of the building plan extensive building renovations in 2019 and expansion in 2024.
