= Imperial Seal =

Imperial Seal refers to the seal used by East Asian imperial families to endorse imperial edicts.

- Heirloom Seal of the Realm, the official seal of the Chinese Empire
- Imperial Seal of Manchukuo, the official seal of the Manchukuo during World War II
- Imperial Seal of the Mongols, the official seal of various Mongol-led regimes
- Imperial Seal of Japan, one of the official seal of Japan
- Imperial Seal of Korea, the official seal of the short-lived Korean Empire
- Seals of the Nguyễn dynasty, the official seals of the last Vietnamese dynasty

== See also ==
- Seal (East Asia)
- Royal seal (disambiguation)
