= Tokaj =

- Town
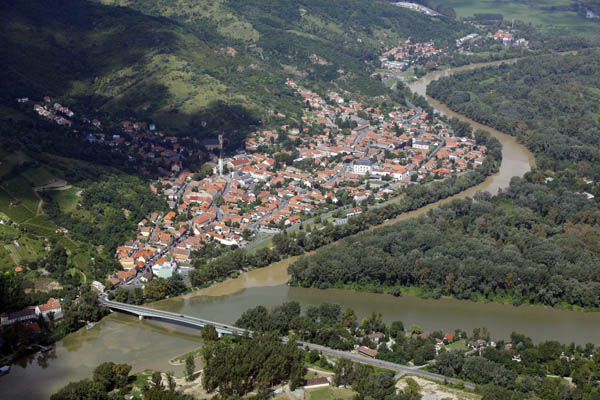

- Flag Coat of arms

- Location within Hungary
- Coordinates: 48.121443°N 21.412468°E
- Country: Hungary
- County: Borsod-Abaúj-Zemplén
- District: Tokaj

Government
  - Mayor: György Posta

Area
  - Total: 28.2 km^{2} (10.9 sq mi)

Population (2025)
  - Total: 3 649
  - Density: 0.11/km^{2} (0.28/sq mi)
- Demonym: Tokaji

Population by ethnicity (2022)
  - Hungarians: 93,1%
  - Germans: 0,5%
  - Greeks: 0,2%
  - Ukrainians: 0.2%
  - Gypsies: 0.2%
  - Croats: 0.1%
  - Rusyns: 0.1%
  - Slovaks: 0.1%
  - Other: 3,2%
  - Unreported: 6,7%

Population by religion (2022)
  - Roman Catholics: 24,1%
  - Calvinists: 19,9%
  - Greek Catholics: 8,2%
  - Other Christians: 1,0%
  - Lutherans: 0.6%
  - Other Catholics: 0,4%
  - Orthodox: 0,1%
  - Israelites: 0,1%
  - Non religious: 8,5%
  - Unreported: 37,0%
- Time zone: UTC+1 (CET)
  - Summer (DST): UTC+2 (CEST)
- Postal code: 3910
- Area code: (+36) 47
- Website: www.tokaj.hu

Tokaj (Hungarian pronunciation: [ˈtokɒj]; Latin: Tokaeum) is a historical town in Borsod-Abaúj-Zemplén County, Hungary. It is the centre of the Tokaj wine region where Tokaji wine is produced.

== Geography ==
It is located in Northern Hungary, about 54 kilometers east of Miskolc, at the confluence of the Tisza and Bodrog rivers, at the foot of Kopasz Hill.

The main road connecting it to the surrounding area is Main Road 38, which provides access from both Szerencs and Nyíregyháza. It is connected to Bodrogkeresztúr by Road 3838, to Taktabáj by Road 3619, and to the other smaller settlements of the Taktaköz region by Road 3621.

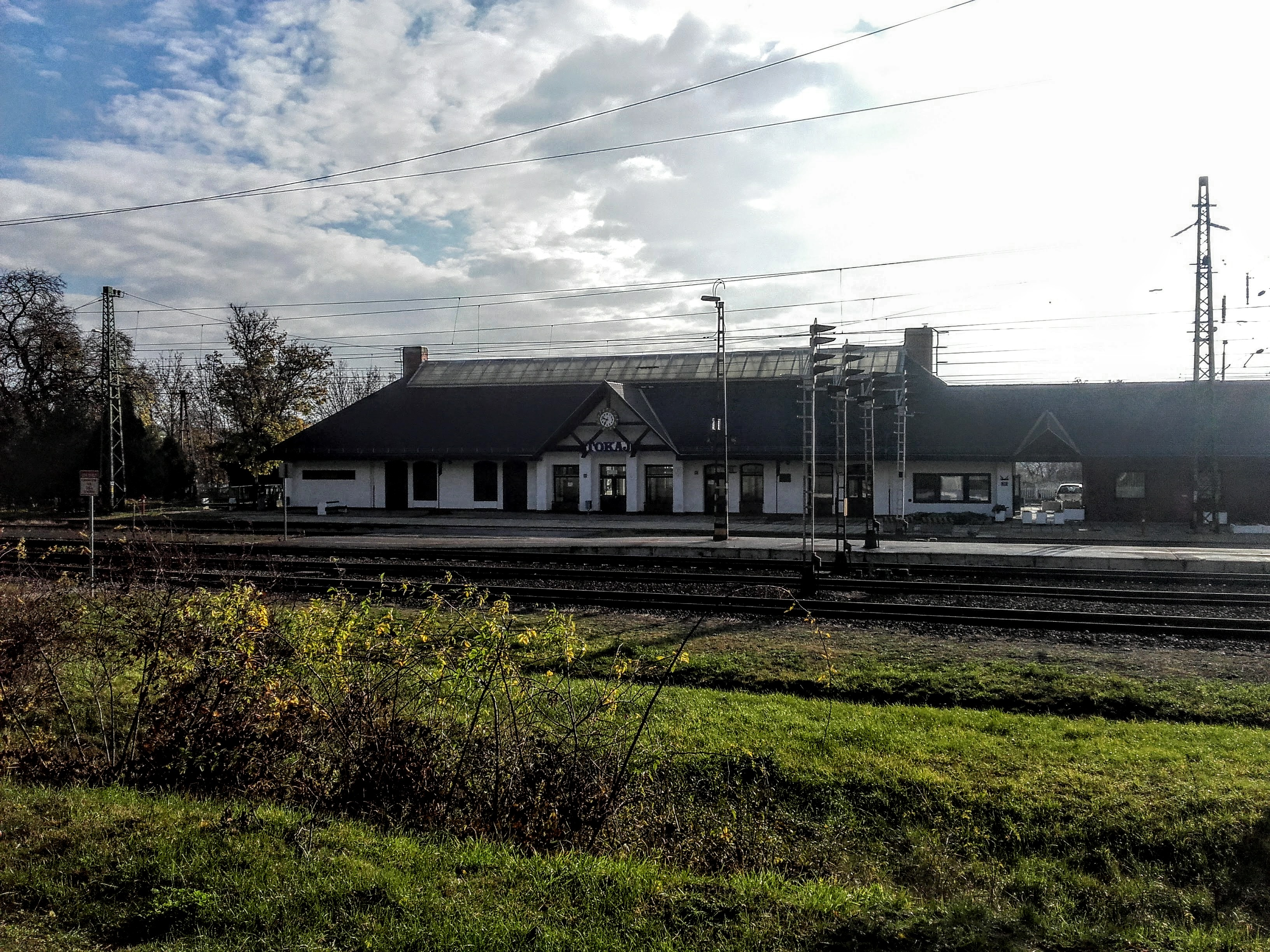
Tokaj train station

It is served by the Mezőzombor–Nyíregyháza railway line, which has one stop here. The Tokaj train station is located on the western edge of the town, and is accessible by road via Secondary Road 36 308.

The regional bus service provider operating in the town is MÁV Passenger Transport, which runs routes to Szerencs, Sárospatak, and Nyíregyháza, among other destinations.

Every weekend during the summer, MÁV operates buses called Tokajbusz around the tourist attractions of the Tokaj wine region.

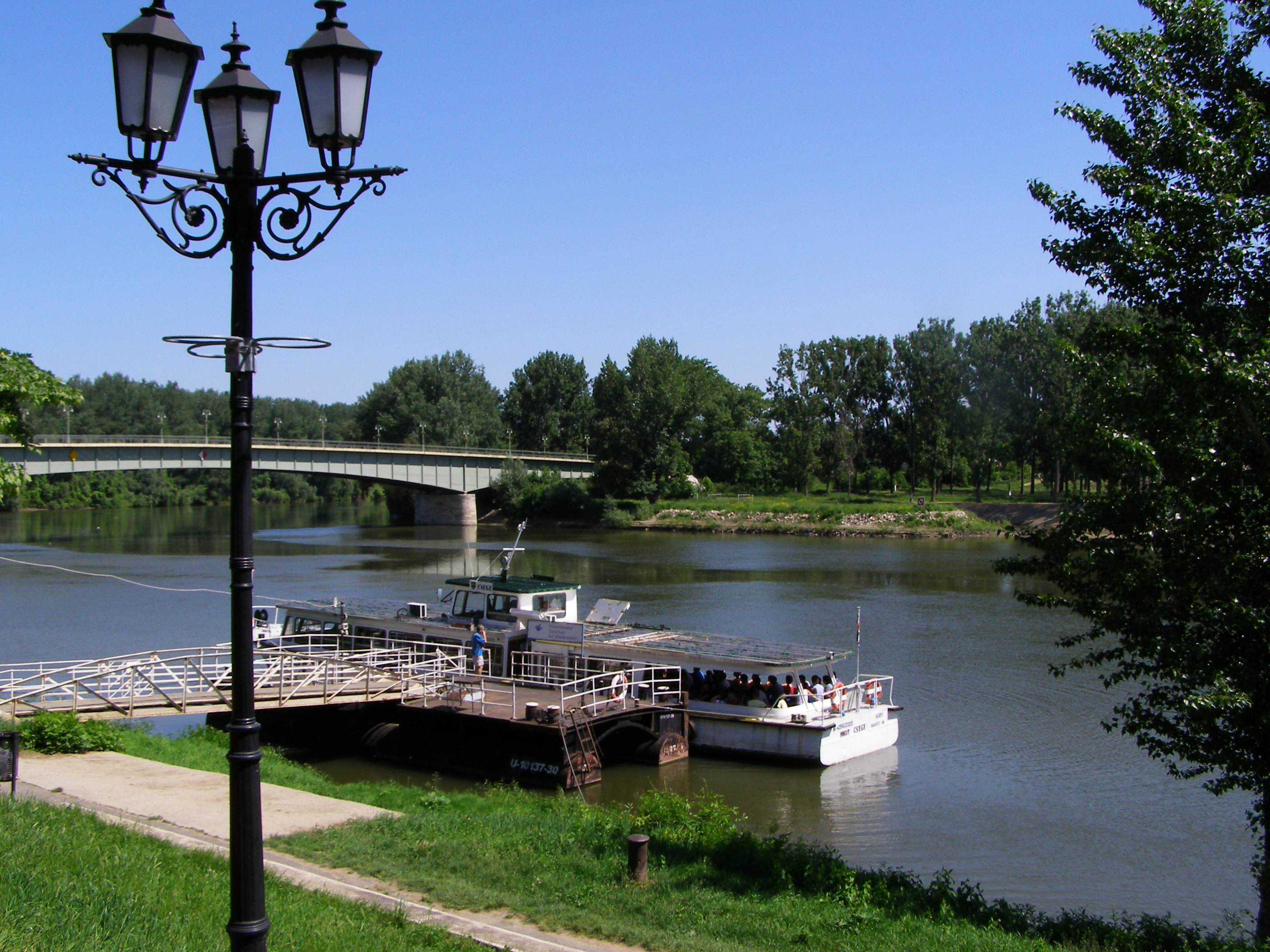
Port of Tokaj

Water transportation also plays a role in accessing the town; many Tisza river tour routes begin or end in Tokaj, or include a stop there.

== History ==
The wine-growing area was first mentioned by the name Tokaj in 1067. The town itself was first mentioned in documents in 1353. Its first castle was a motte, which was destroyed during the Mongol invasion of Hungary. By the 14th century, the town already had a stone castle, belonging to the Diósgyőr estate.

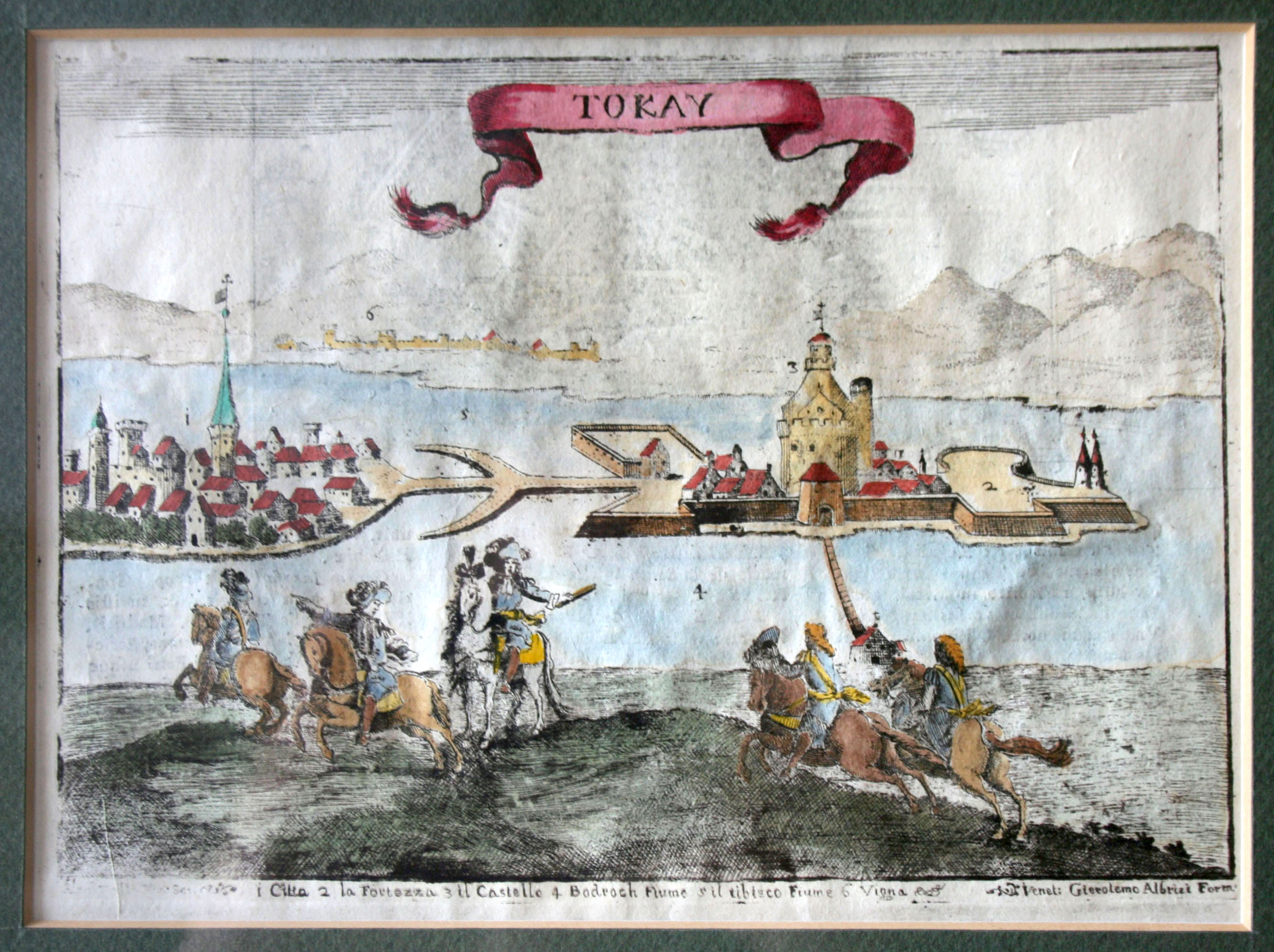
Tokaj Castle around 1664

After 1450, Tokaj was the property of the Hunyadi family, so after Matthias Hunyadi became king, the town became a royal estate. In 1526, after the Ottomans captured Pétervárad (modern day Petrovaradin, Serbia) against the combined forces of Croats, Serbs and Hungarian Cistercians from Pétervarad and its surroundings relocated to Tokaj and greatly improved wine making in the area. In 1705, Francis II Rákóczi ordered the castle to be destroyed.

After the Austro-Hungarian Compromise of 1867, the town prospered, but when the World Wars came, it suffered greatly, losing its importance and town status. Even its role in wine trade was taken over by Sátoraljaújhely.

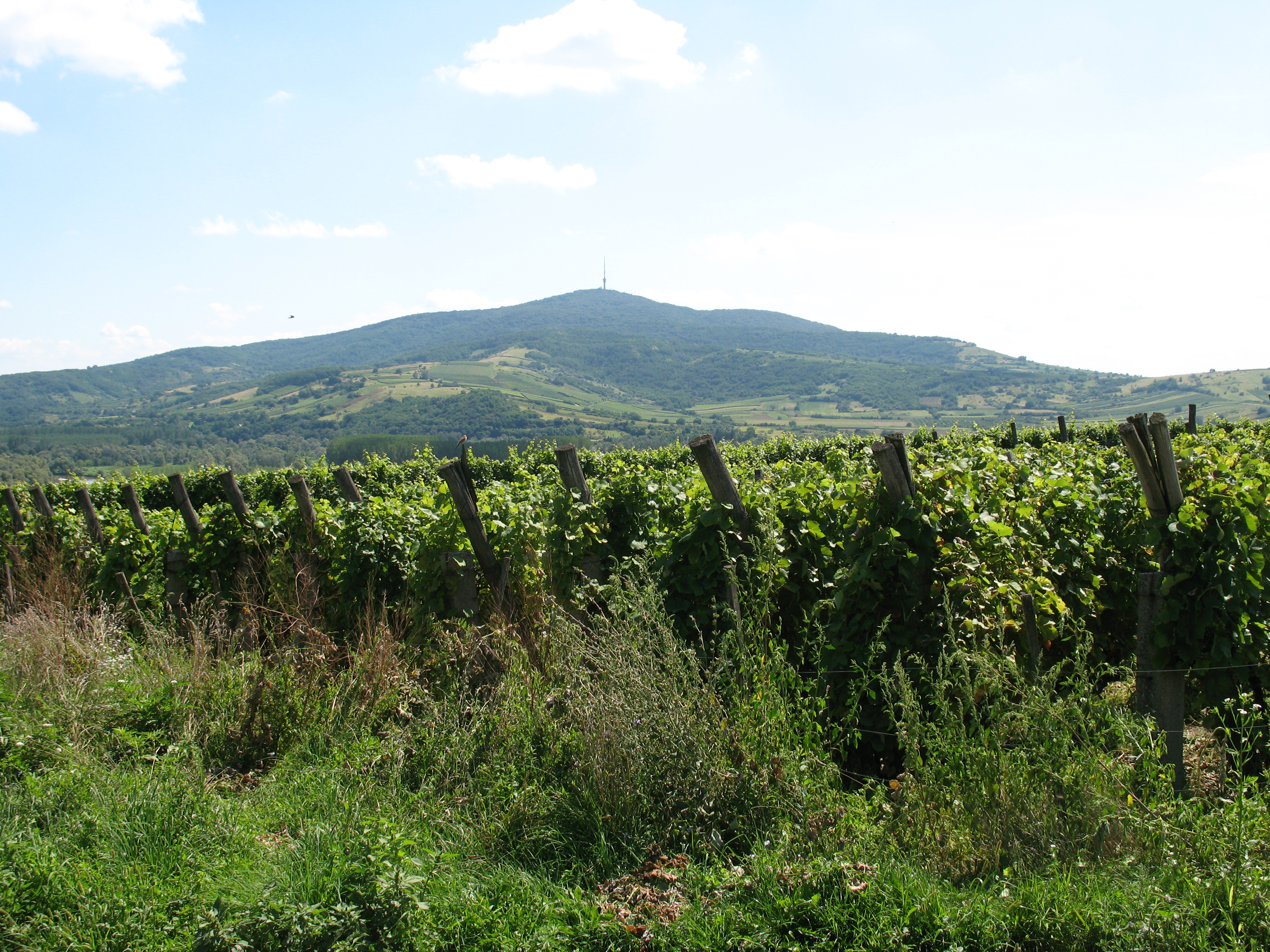
Vineyards in Tokaj

Tokaj was granted town status again in 1986 and it again started to prosper. Now, the town is a popular tourist attraction.

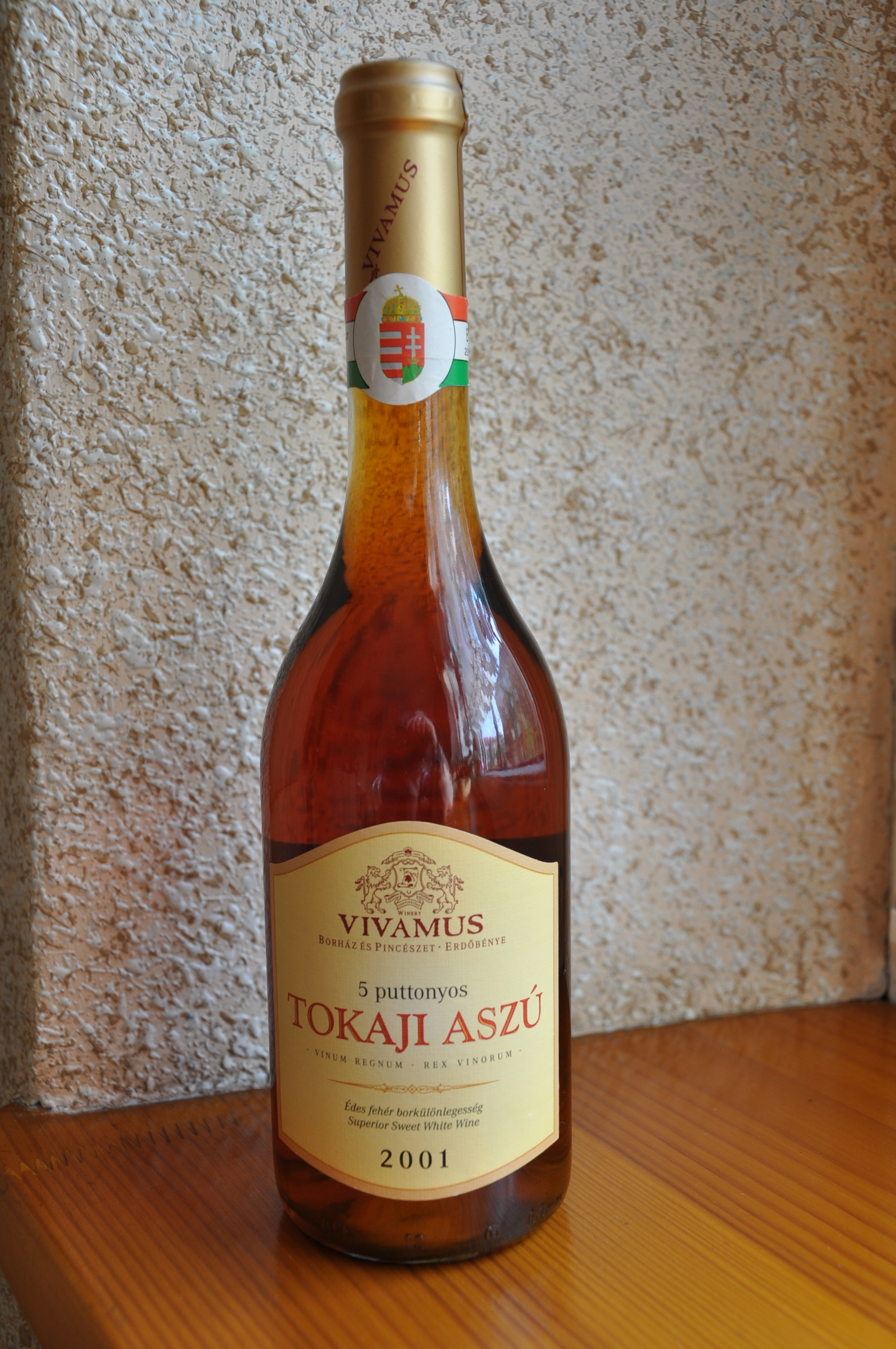
A bottle of Tokaji Aszú

== Tokaj wine region ==
Tokaj wine region (Tokaji borrégió) is a historical wine region located in northeastern Hungary and southeastern Slovakia. It is one of the seven larger wine regions of Hungary. Hegyalja means "foothills" in Hungarian, and this was the original name of the region.

The region consists of 28 villages and 11,149 hectares of classified vineyards, of which an estimated 5,500 are currently planted. Tokaj has been declared a World Heritage Site in 2002 under the name Tokaj Wine Region Historic Cultural Landscape. However, its fame long predated this distinction because it is the origin of Tokaji aszú wine, the world's oldest botrytized wine.

== Twin towns ==
Tokaj is twinned with:

- Binyamina-Giv'at Ada, Israel
- Cormons, Italy
- Dej, Romania
- Iwonicz-Zdrój, Poland
- Oestrich-Winkel, Germany
- Rust, Austria
- Sonoma, United States
- Supetar, Croatia

== Main sights ==
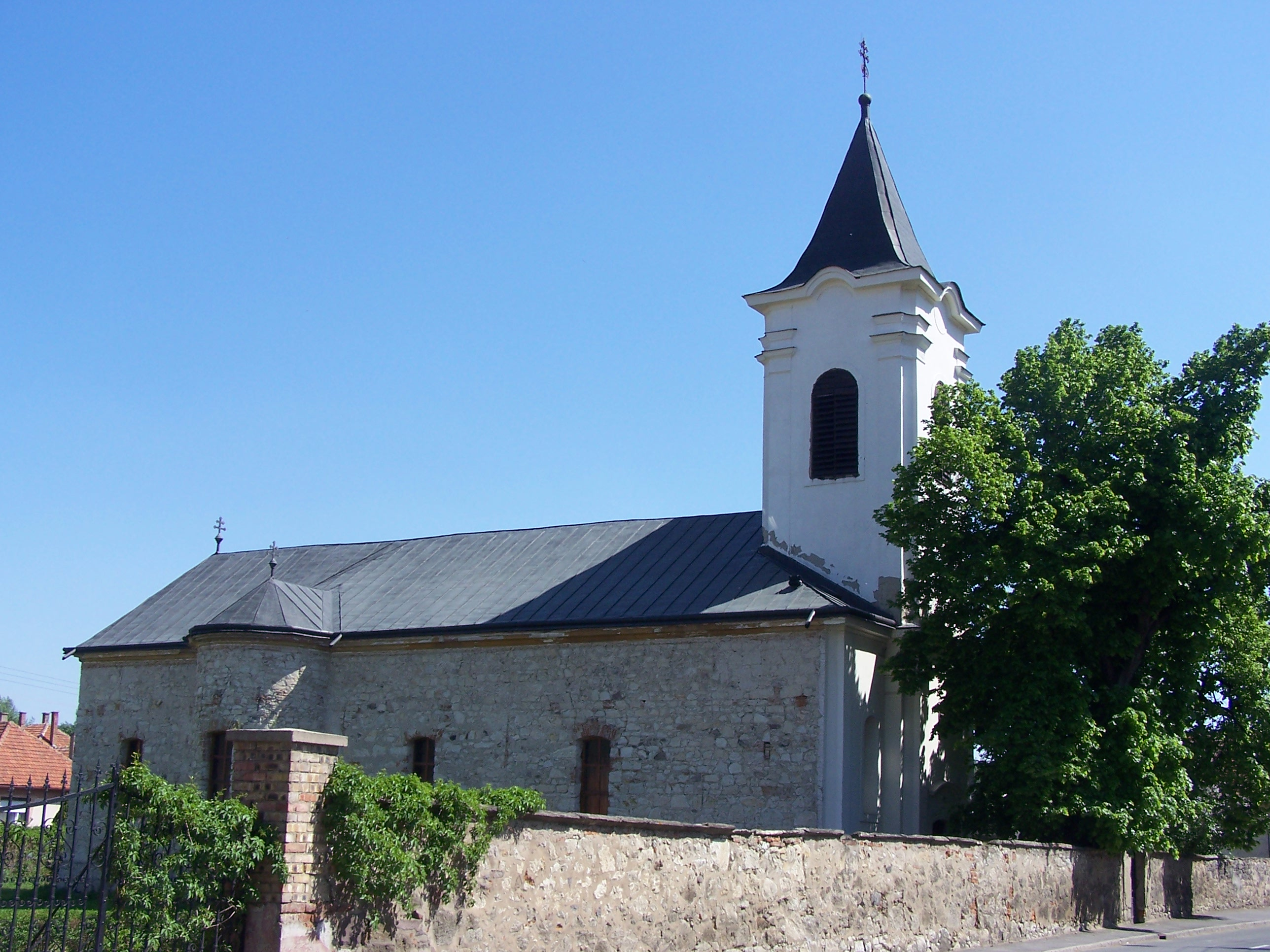
St. Nicholas Greek Catholic Church

- Historic downtown with the city center
- Confluence of the Tisza and Bodrog rivers
- St. Nicholas Orthodox Church – 18th-century Russian Orthodox church
- Church of the Sacred Heart of Jesus – 20th-century Roman Catholic church in the Neo-Romanesque style
- St. Nicholas Greek Catholic Church – the oldest church in Tokaj
- Rákóczi-Dessewffy Castle – 18th-century baroque castle
- Ruins of the former Tokaj Castle
- Wine cellars
- Tisza bridge
- Synagogue
- Tokaj TV Tower
- Tokaj open stage (″Fesztivalkatlan″)

== Gallery ==
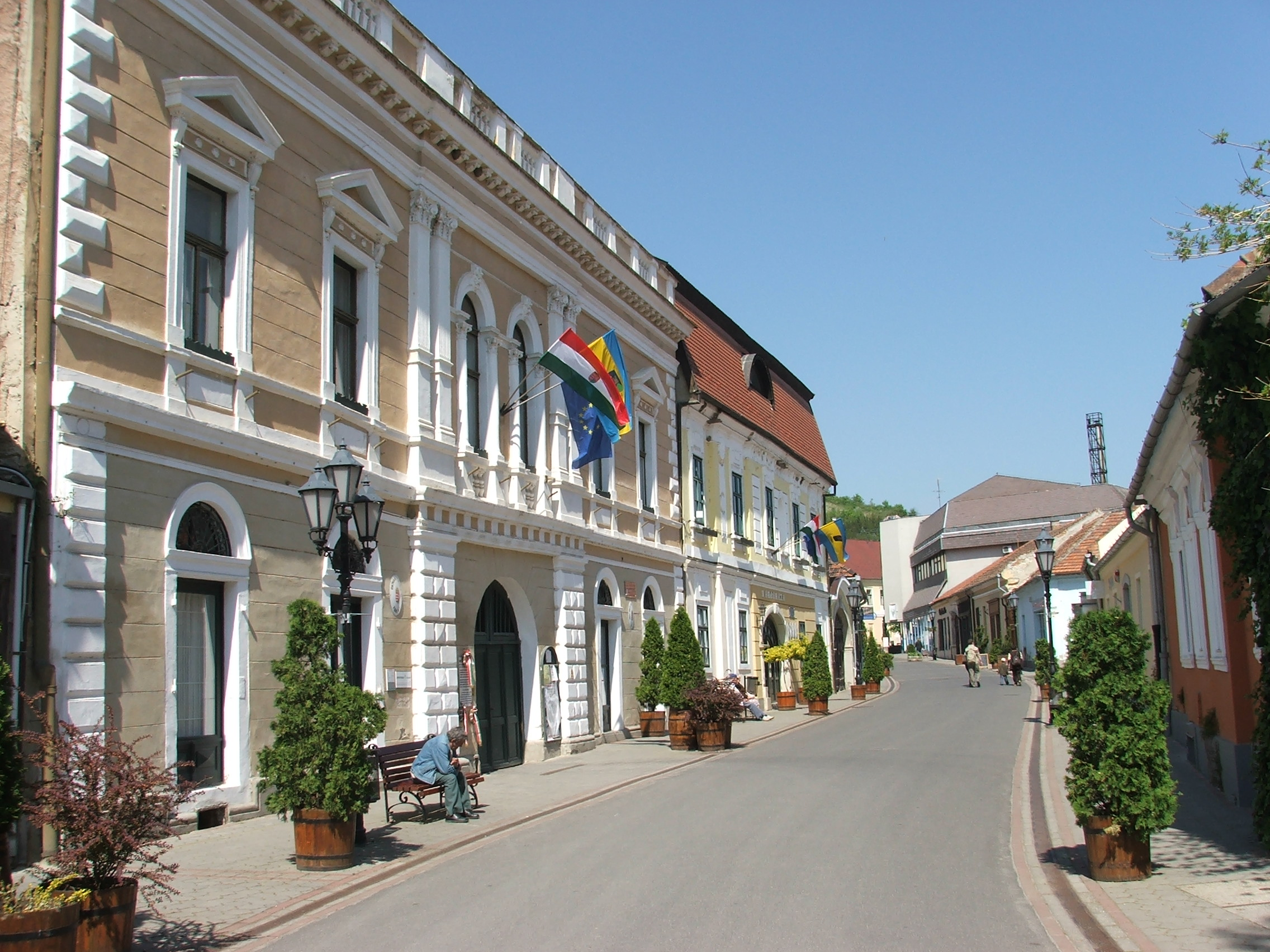
City center

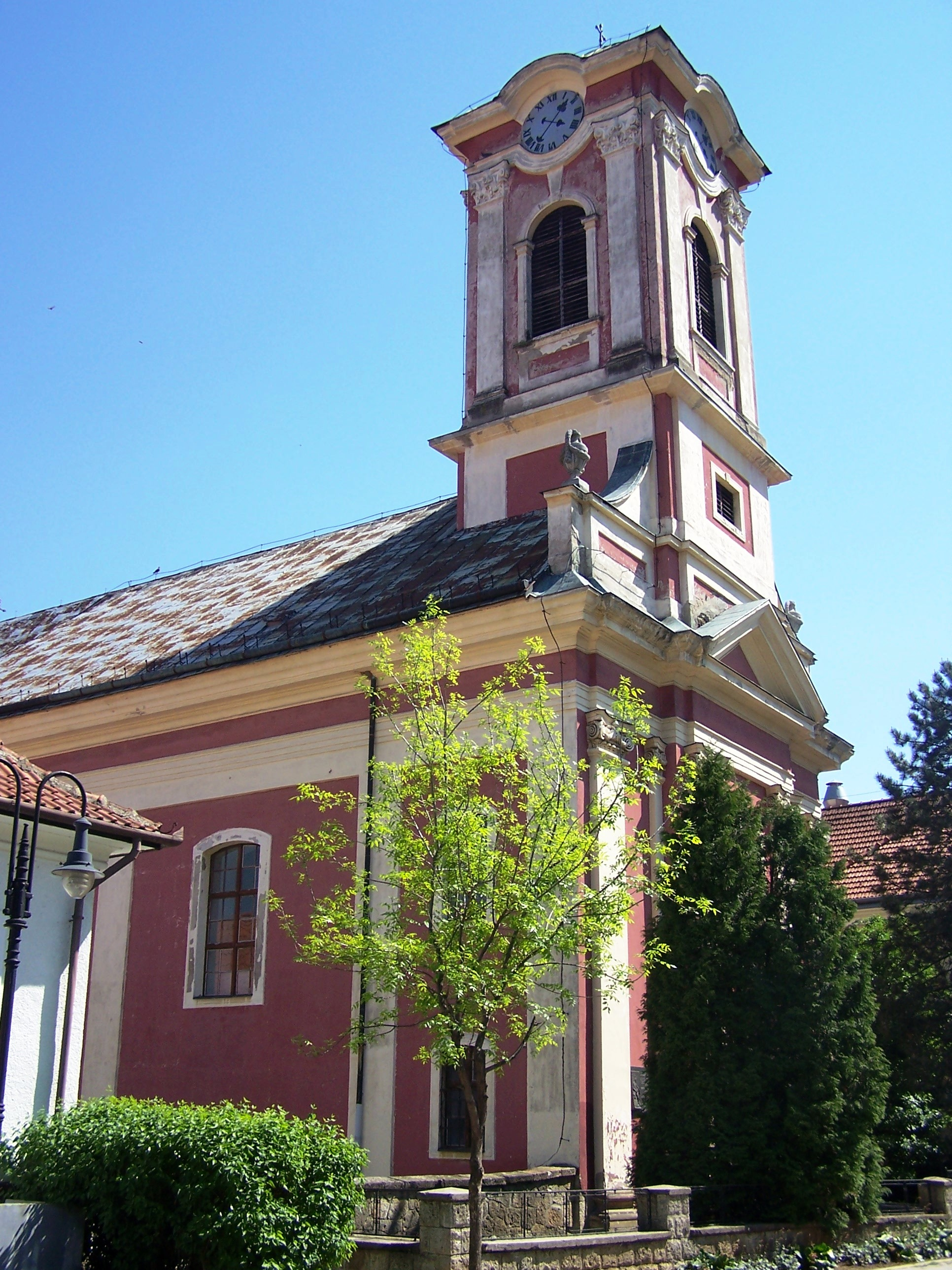
Orthodox church

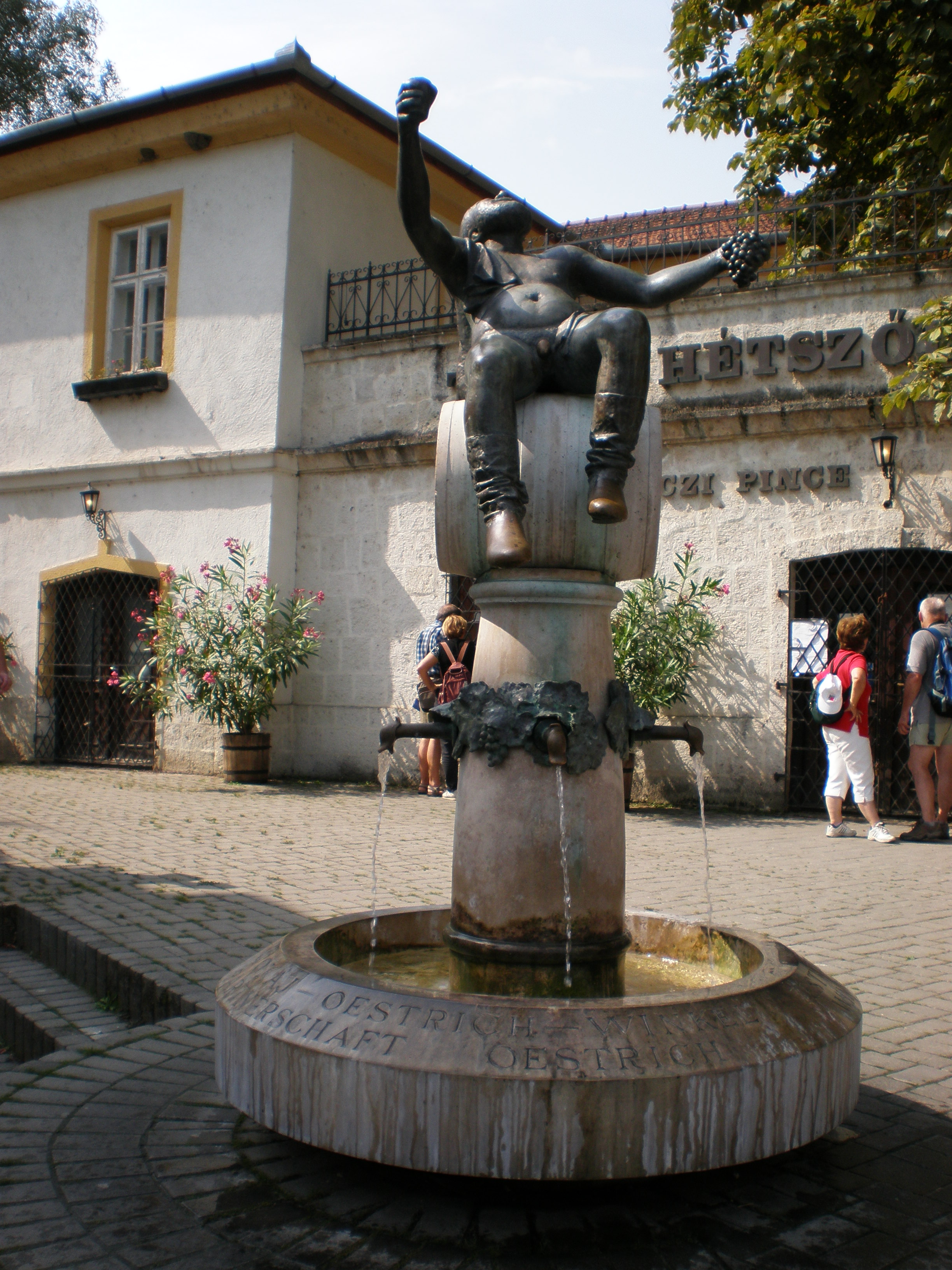
Bacchus fountain

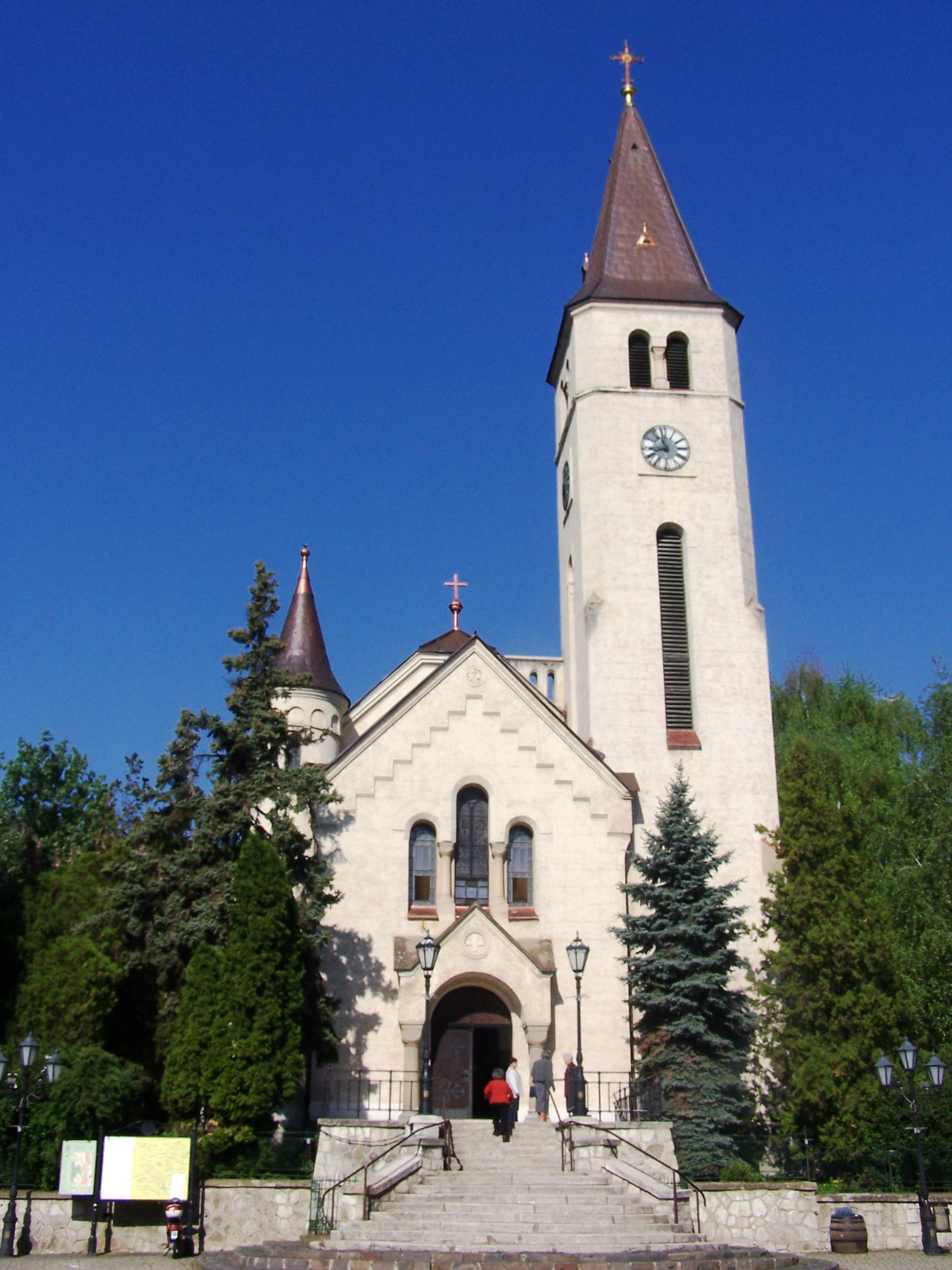
Catholic church

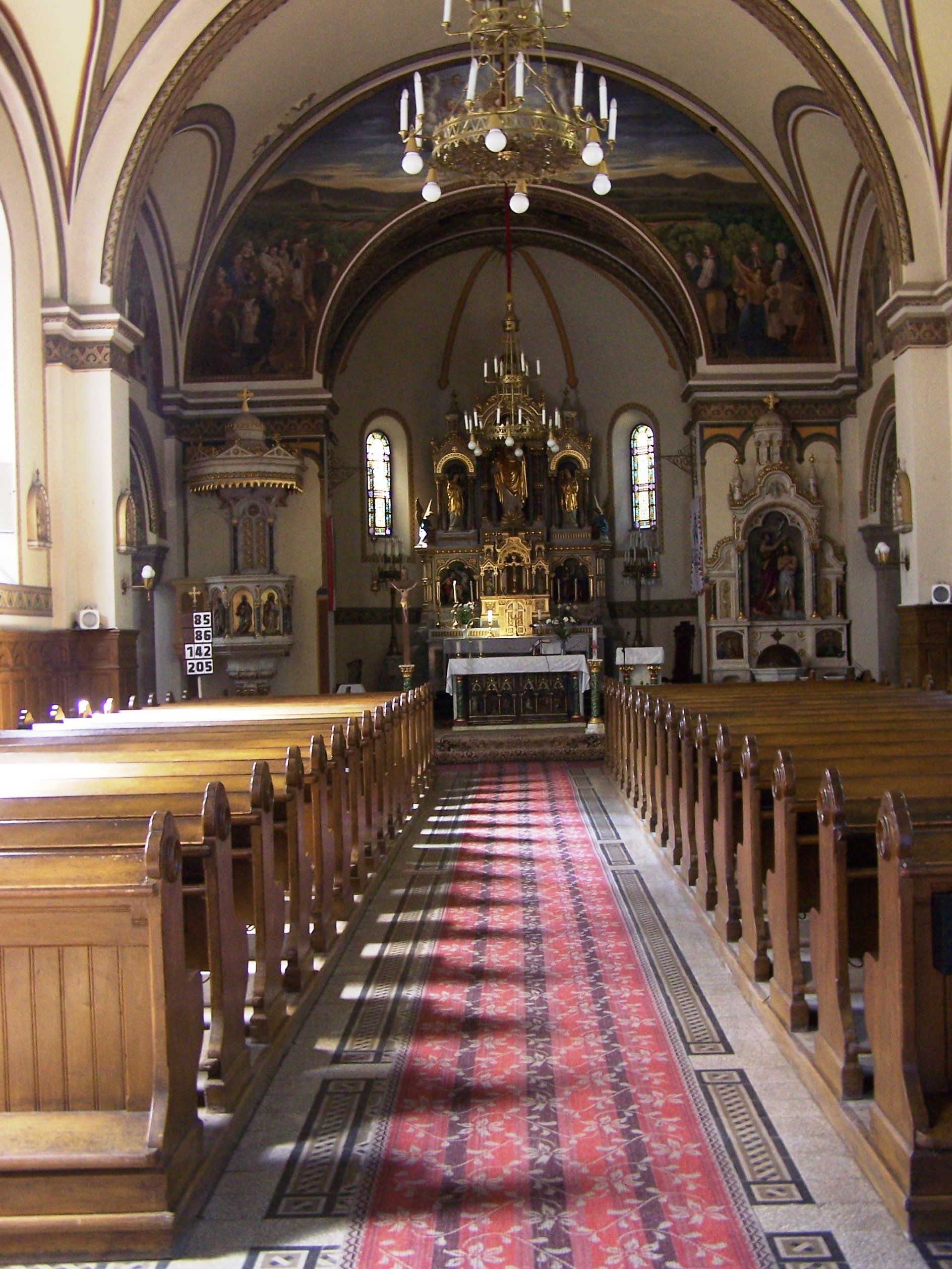
Interior of Roman Catholic Church

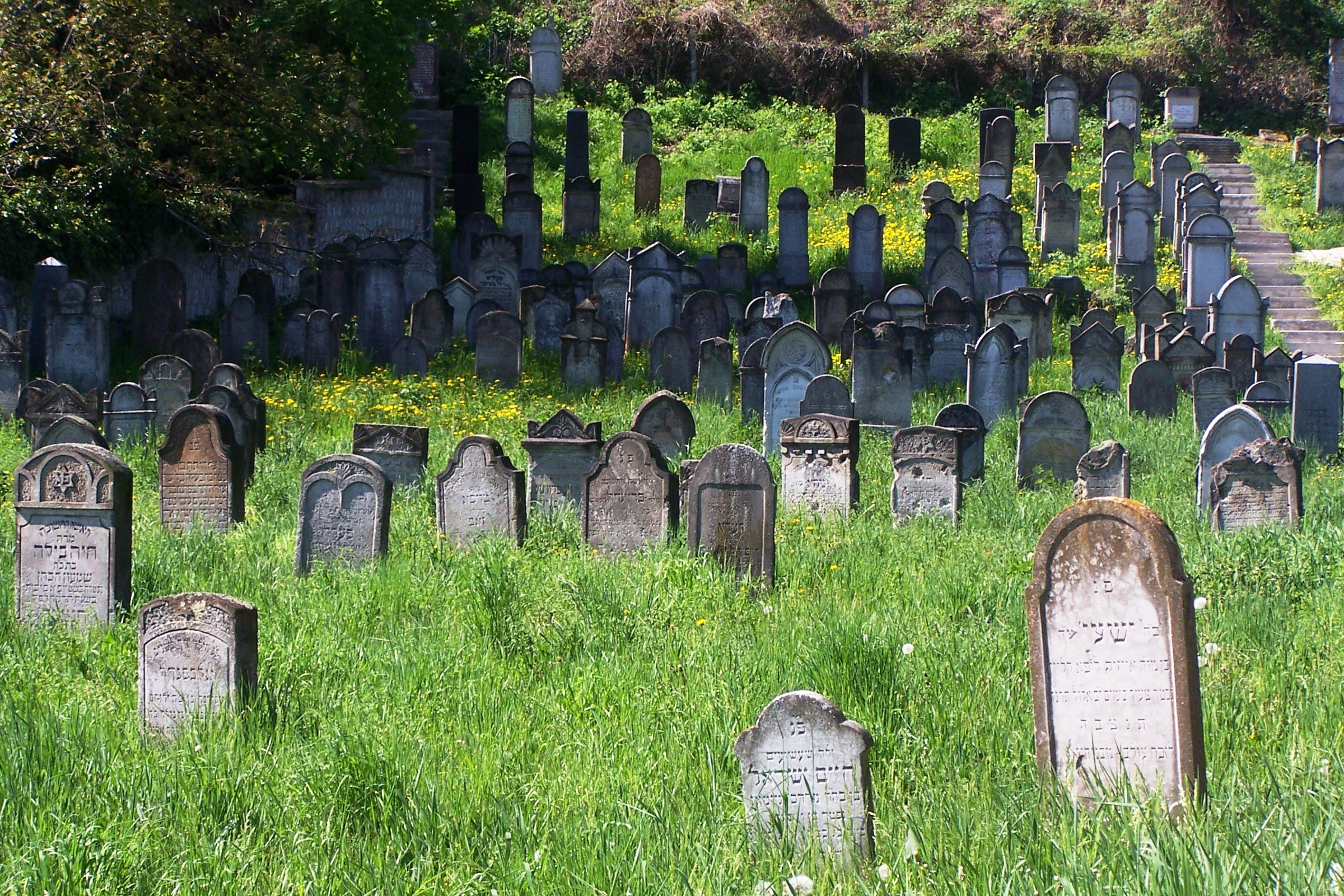
Jewish cemetery

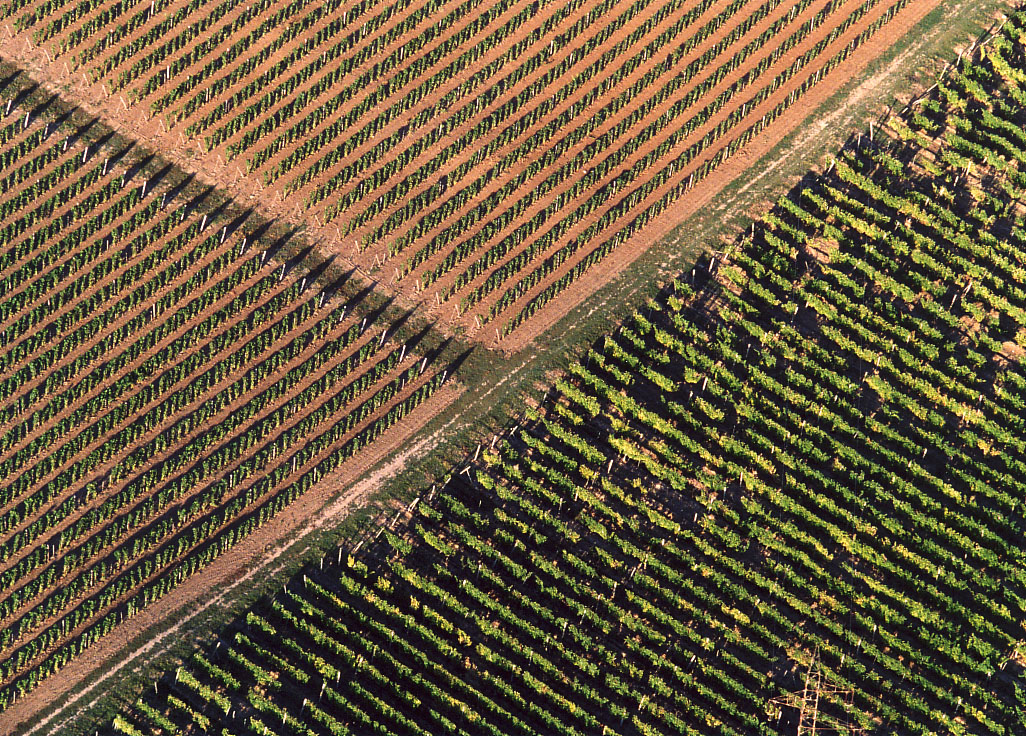
Tokaj wine region

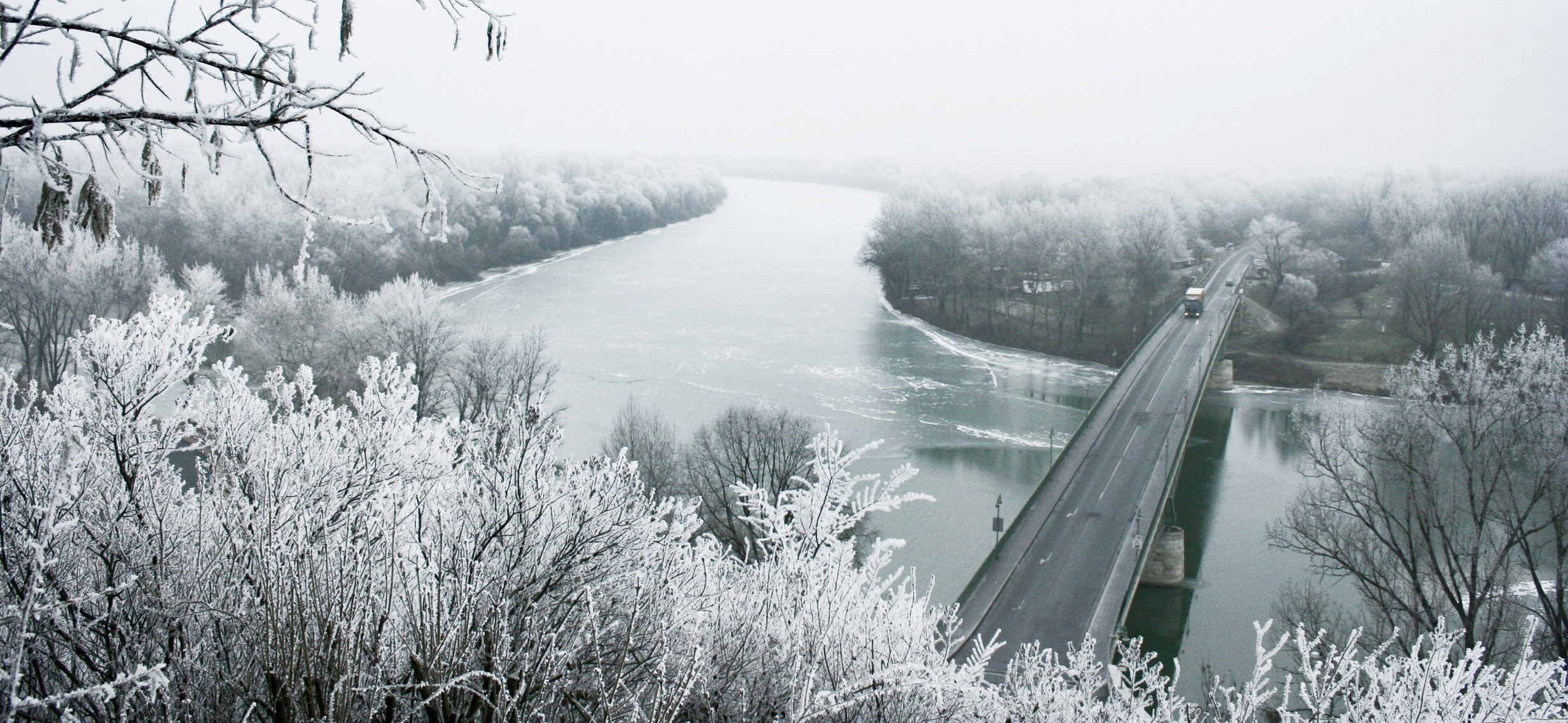
River Tisza in winter with Tokaj bridge

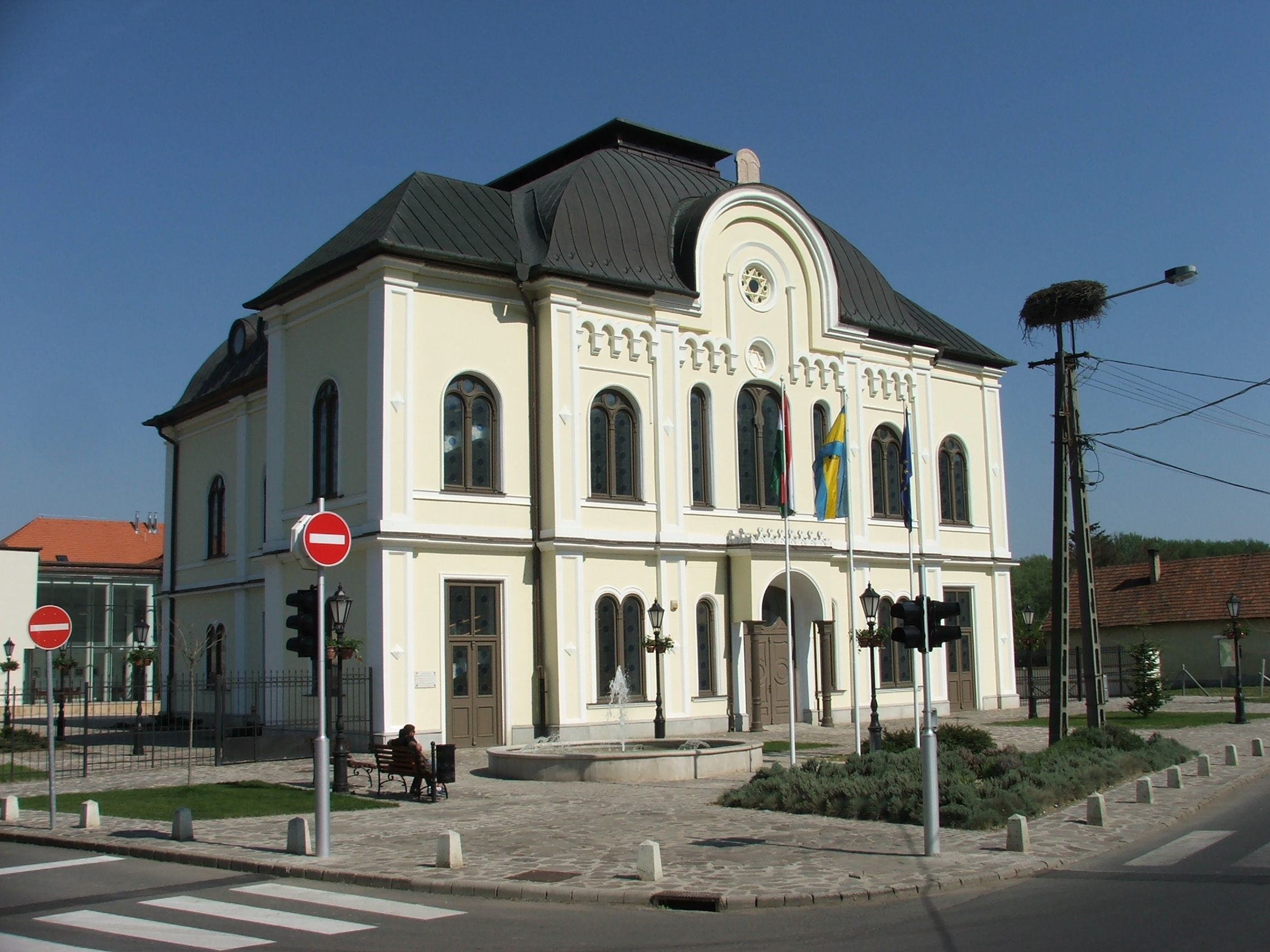
Synagogue
