= Imperial Theater =

Imperial Theater or Imperial Theatre may refer to:

== In Europe ==
- Imperial Theater, Copenhagen, Denmark
- Imperial Theatre, at the former Royal Aquarium, London
- Imperial Theatres of Russian Empire, existed in Saint Petersburg and Moscow till 1917.

== In North America ==
- Imperial Theatre (Augusta, Georgia)
- Imperial Theater (San Francisco)
- Imperial Theatre, New York City
- Imperial Theatre, Saint John, New Brunswick, Canada
- Imperial Theatre, Toronto, former cinema now the Ed Mirvish Theatre

== In Asia ==
- Imperial Theatre (Tokyo)
