= Imperial (British automobile) =

Name used for three separate makes of British automobiles

Imperial was the name used for three separate makes of British car.

== Imperial (Manchester) 1901-1906 ==
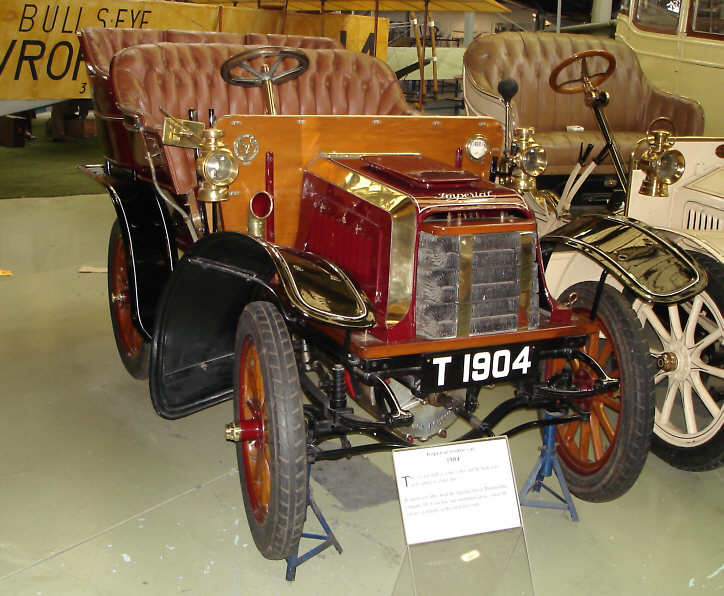
The 1904 Imperial in the Manchester Museum of Science and Industry.

Imperial Autocar Manufacturing company was based in Manchester, England. Two cars were introduced in 1901 with either a 3.5 hp 2 cylinder engine under the seat or 6 hp 2 cylinder engine front mounted.

Later the company sold French Lacoste et Battman models with Imperial bodies. The last ones seem to have been sold around 1906.

== Imperial (Croydon) 1904-1905 ==
Another Imperial was made by the Anti-Vibrator company of Croydon, Surrey. These were electrically powered with a motor in each rear wheel. Unusually for the time, the car had integral construction of body and chassis.

== Imperial (London) 1914 ==
The Imperial cyclecar was made by Implitico, a theatre lighting company in London, for one year only immediately before the First World War. The power came from an 8 hp V-twin Precision engine with a "gearbox" giving seven forward speeds and optional reverse using belts and pulleys.

The Model A cost £110 and had reverse, the Model B at £95 did without. About 12 cars were made.

== See also ==
- List of car manufacturers of the United Kingdom
