= Rockaway Beach Hotel =

Former hotel in Queens, New York

Coordinates: 40.580°N 73.832°W

- Interactive map of the Rockaway Beach Hotel area
- Alternative names: Hotel Imperial

General information
- Type: Hotel
- Location: Rockaway Queens, New York City, present-day Beach 110th Street to Beach 116th Street
- Year built: late 1870, early 1880
- Destroyed: 1889

Height
- Height: 1184 feet (360.9m)

Dimensions
- Other dimensions: 250 feet (76.2m) wide

The Rockaway Beach Hotel, also known as the Hotel Imperial, was a large hotel built in Rockaway, Queens, New York City during the late 1870s and early 1880s by the Rockaway Improvement Company. The hotel, promoted as the "biggest hotel in the world", ran along the Rockaway beachfront from the present-day Beach 110th Street to Beach 116th Street, thus locating it in the contemporary Rockaway Park neighborhood rather than Rockaway Beach as the name implies.

The hotel, the product of an age of superlatives which also produced the Brooklyn Bridge, was 1,184 feet (361 m) long and 250 feet (76 m) wide. Construction of the hotel was beset by labor difficulties and lack of capital; a railroad station opened in front of the hotel on August 26, 1880, but, except for one wing which was pressed into service for the summer of 1881, the hotel, although construction was completed, never actually opened for business. It was torn down for its lumber in 1889.

The name "Rockaway Beach Hotel" has been used for at least two smaller hotels since the original's demolition.

== Sources ==
- Vincent Seyfried and William Asadorian, Old Rockaway, New York, in Early Photographs, Dover Publications, Mineola, NY, 2000.
- Vincent F. Seyfried, The Long Island Rail Road: A Comprehensive History, Part Five, published by the author, Garden City, Long Island, 1966.
