= Imperial palace =

Imperial Palace may refer to:

== Palaces ==
- Imperial Palace (Kōkyo, 皇居), Tokyo, Japan
- Kyoto Imperial Palace (Kyōto Gosho, 京都御所), Kyoto, Japan
- Imperial Palace of Goslar, Goslar, Germany

== Hotels ==
- IP Casino Resort Spa, Biloxi, Mississippi, formerly the Imperial Palace Biloxi
- The Linq, Las Vegas, Nevada, formerly the Imperial Palace Hotel and Casino

== Other uses ==
- Imperial Palace (novel), a 1930 novel by Arnold Bennett

== See also ==
- Kaiserpfalz (Imperial Palace), castles which served as temporary, secondary seats of power for the Holy Roman Emperor
- Forbidden City, Beijing, China, designated by UNESCO as the "Imperial Palace of the Ming and Qing Dynasties"
- Imperial City, Huế, a walled palace in Huế, Vietnam
