= Greek Orthodox Church and Museum, Miskolc =

Coordinates: 48.1067°N 20.7834°E

Greek Orthodox Church
- Holy Trinity Church
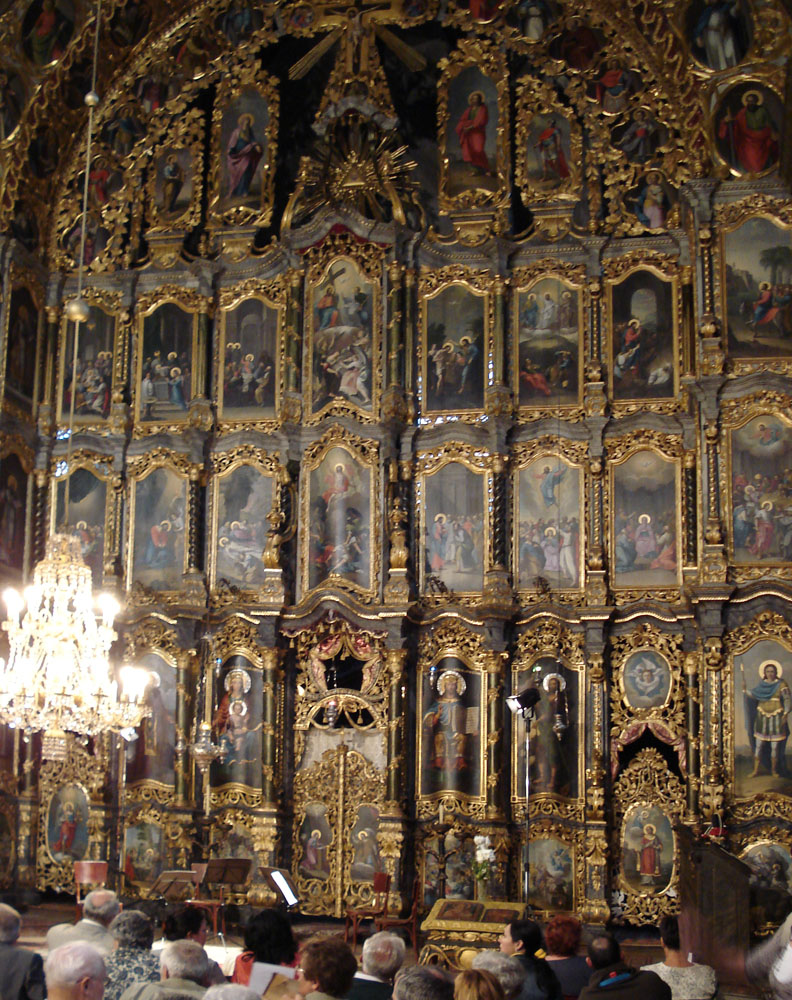
- Greek Orthodox Church
- Location: Miskolc
- Country: Hungary
- Denomination: Eastern Orthodox

Architecture
- Functional status: active
- Style: Zopf

Administration
- Diocese: Hungary
- Parish: Holy Trinity

The Holy Trinity Greek Orthodox Church and its Liturgical Museum can be found in the Downtown of Miskolc (7 Deák square.)

The church was built between 1785 and 1806 in Zopf style. Its furniture is also in Zopf style, from the late 18th century. It is a listed historic monument. The church houses an iconostasis 16 m high, with 88 pictures of the life of Jesus. The Baroque iconostasis was carved in the workshop of Miklós Jankovits of Eger, the pictures (with the exception of four of them) were painted by Anton Kuchelmeister of Vienna. The copy of the Akhtyrka Icon of the Mother of God was a gift from Empress Catherine II of Russia.

The Orthodox believers already had a small chapel in the early 18th century (St. Naum Chapel), which stood on today's Széchenyi street. The building of the church was decided in the second part of the century. Originally they planned to build a large church with an onion dome, designed by Johannes Michart, but it was opposed by the (mainly Protestant) leaders of the city and by those who were accustomed to the more conservative artistic styles of the period. It was finally decided that the church would be built according to the design by Johann Michael Schajdlet. The interior is divided into three parts: entrance hall, naos, and sanctuary.

A school (1805), a hospital and a parsonage were also built next to the church. The churchyard also served as a burial place, several of the marble tombstones are still there.

The Orthodox Liturgical Museum of Hungary houses the richest Orthodox liturgical collection of Hungary. The museum was opened in the building of the former school in 1988. Its permanent exhibition shows the history and arts of the Orthodox Church and schools. The first room resembles a chapel, recalling the atmosphere of Greek chapels where believers worshiped before large Baroque churches were built. In the second room visitors can see goldsmith's work and liturgical clothes, while in the third room the icon collection is exhibited.
