= Üröm =

- Flag Coat of arms

- Location of Üröm in Hungary
- Coordinates: 47.59857°N 19.01379°E
- Country: Hungary
- Region: Central Hungary
- County: Pest
- Subregion: Pilisvörösvári
- Rank: Village

Government
  - Mayor: Laboda Gábor

Area
  - Total: 6.66 km^{2} (2.57 sq mi)

Population (1 January 2008)
  - Total: 6,790
  - Density: 1,020/km^{2} (2,640/sq mi)
- Time zone: UTC+1 (CET)
  - Summer (DST): UTC+2 (CEST)
- Postal code: 2096
- Area code: +36 26
- KSH code: 11934
- Website: www.urom.hu

Üröm is a village in Pest county, Hungary. In 2008, the population was 6,790.
