= Imperial Court =

An imperial court is the royal court of an empire.

Imperial Court may also refer to:

- Imperial court (Holy Roman Empire)
- Imperial Court, London, residential building
- Imperial Court in Kyoto, pre-Meiji period in Japan
- Imperial Court System, a non-profit organization in North America
- Imperial Courts, Los Angeles, public housing
- Neutral Municipality of the Court, Administrative Unit Created by the Imperial Brazil in Rio de Janeiro

== See also ==
- List of empires
