= Pest County 3rd constituency =

- Constituency for the National Assembly
- Location of Pest county 03 within Pest county

- Location of Pest county within Hungary
- County: Pest
- Electorate: 82,977 (2026)
- Major settlements: Pilisvörösvár

Current constituency
- Created: 2024
- Party: Tisza Party
- Member: Andrea Bujdosó
- Elected: 2026

The Pest County 3rd parliamentary constituency is one of the 106 constituencies into which the territory of Hungary is divided by Act LXXIX of 2024, and in which voters can elect one member of the National Assembly. The standard abbreviation of the constituency name is: Pest 03. OEVK. The seat is Pilisvörösvár.

== Area ==
The constituency includes the following settlements:

1. Budajenő
2. Budakalász
3. Piliscsaba
4. Csobánka
5. Herceghalom
6. Páty
7. Perbál
8. Pilisborosjenő
9. Pilisjászfalu
10. Pilisszántó
11. Pilisszentiván
12. Pilisszentkereszt
13. Pilisvörösvár
14. Solymár
15. Telki
16. Tinnye
17. Tök
18. Üröm
19. Zsámbék

== Members ==
| Name | Party | Term | Elected |
|---|---|---|---|
| Sándor Hadházy | Fidesz-KDNP | 2014–2022 | Results of the 2014 parliamentary election: |
| Sándor Hadházy | Fidesz-KDNP | 2014–2022 | Results of the 2018 parliamentary election: |
| Eszter Vitályos | Fidesz-KDNP | 2022–2026 | Results of the 2022 parliamentary election: |
| Andrea Bujdosó | Tisza Party | 2026 – present | Results of the 2026 parliamentary election: 58.24% |

== Demographics ==
The demographics of the constituency are as follows. The population of the 3rd constituency of Pest County was 119,277 on 1 October 2022. The population of the constituency increased by 13,972 between the 2011 and 2022 censuses. Based on the age composition, the middle-aged population is the largest in the constituency with 48,923 people, while the elderly are the smallest with 21,420 people. 89.5% of the population of the constituency has internet access.

Historical population
| Year | Pop. | ±% |
|---|---|---|
| 2011 | 101,305 | — |
| 2022 | 119,277 | +17.7% |

According to the highest level of completed education, those with a diploma are the most numerous, with 33,795 people, followed by those with a high school diploma, with 33,759 people.

According to economic activity, almost half of the population is employed, 60,665 people, the second most significant group is inactive earners, who are mainly pensioners, with 23,148 people.

The most significant ethnic group in the constituency is Germans with 4,164 people and Slovaks with 1,098 people. The proportion of foreign citizens without Hungarian citizenship is 1.2%.

In terms of religious composition, the largest religion in the constituency is Roman Catholic (29,533 people), with a significant community of Calvinists (9,238 people). The number of people not belonging to a religious community is also significant (13,370 people), the second largest group in the constituency after Roman Catholicism.

== Parliamentary elections ==
=== 2022 ===
2022 Hungarian parliamentary election
| Party | Candidate |
|---|---|
| Munkáspárt-ISZOMM | Pálmai Ferenc |
| Fidesz-KDNP | Vitályos Eszter |
| MEMO | Polocsányi Béla |
| MKKP | Kövesdi Miklós |
| Normális Élet Pártja | Tihanyi Csaba |
| Mi Hazánk | Pál Béla |
| Egységben Magyarországért | Buzinkay György |

=== 2018 ===
2018 Hungarian parliamentary election
| Party | Candidate | Votes | % | ± % |
|---|---|---|---|---|
| Fidesz-KDNP | Sándor Hadházy | | 46.11 | ▼1.17 |
| DK | Király Miklós | | 19.3 | ▼7.37 |
| Jobbik | Pál Gábor | | 17.45 | ▲3.34 |
| LMP | Drávucz Zsolt | | 7.07 | ▼0.16 |
| Együtt | Spät Judit | | 3.07 | ▼23.6 |
| MKKP | Kövesdi Miklós Gábor | | 2.74 | - |
| Momentum | Vásárhelyi Judit | | 2.21 | - |
| Munkáspárt | Pálmai Ferenc | | 0.34 | - |
| Egyéb pártok | | | 1.72 | ▼2.48 |
| Turnout | | | 76.34 | ▲7.67 |
| Number of voters | | | 100 | ▲3.46 |
Fidesz-KDNP holds the district.

=== 2014 ===
2014 Hungarian parliamentary election
| Party | Candidate | Votes | % |
|---|---|---|---|
| Fidesz-KDNP | Hadházy Sándor | | 47.28 |
| Összefogás | Szinna Gábor | | 26.67 |
| Jobbik | Levente Murányi | | 14.11 |
| LMP | János Kardos-Horváth | | 7.23 |
| Szociáldemokraták | Dr. Diószegi Gábor | | 0.5 |
| Egyéb pártok | | | 4.2 |
| Turnout | | | 68.67 |
| Number of voters | | | 100 |
Fidesz-KDNP holds the district.

== Opposition primary election – 2021 ==
2021 Hungarian opposition primary
| Faction | Nominating organizations | Candidate | Votes | % |
|---|---|---|---|---|
| Momentum | Momentum, MSZP, Párbeszéd, ÚK | György Buzinkay | 3313 | 37,37 |
| Jobbik | Jobbik, LMP, DK, ÚVNP | Pál Gábor | 3028 | 34,15 |
| LMP | MMM | Kóder György | 1698 | 19,15 |
| LMP | Független | Andrea Katona | 827 | 9,33 |
| Total votes | | | 8866 | |
Buzinkay György wins the district.

== Sources ==
- ↑ Vjt.: "2011. évi CCIII. törvény az országgyűlési képviselők választásáról". Nemzeti Jogszabálytár. Magyar Közlöny Lap- és Könyvkiadó Kft.
- ↑ KSH: "Az országgyűlési egyéni választókerületek adatai". Népszámlálás 2011. Központi Statisztikai Hivatal.
