= Pilisvörösvár District =

Coordinates: 47.6167°N 18.9167°E

Pilisvörösvár District Pilisvörösvári járás
- Districts of Hungary
- Coat of arms

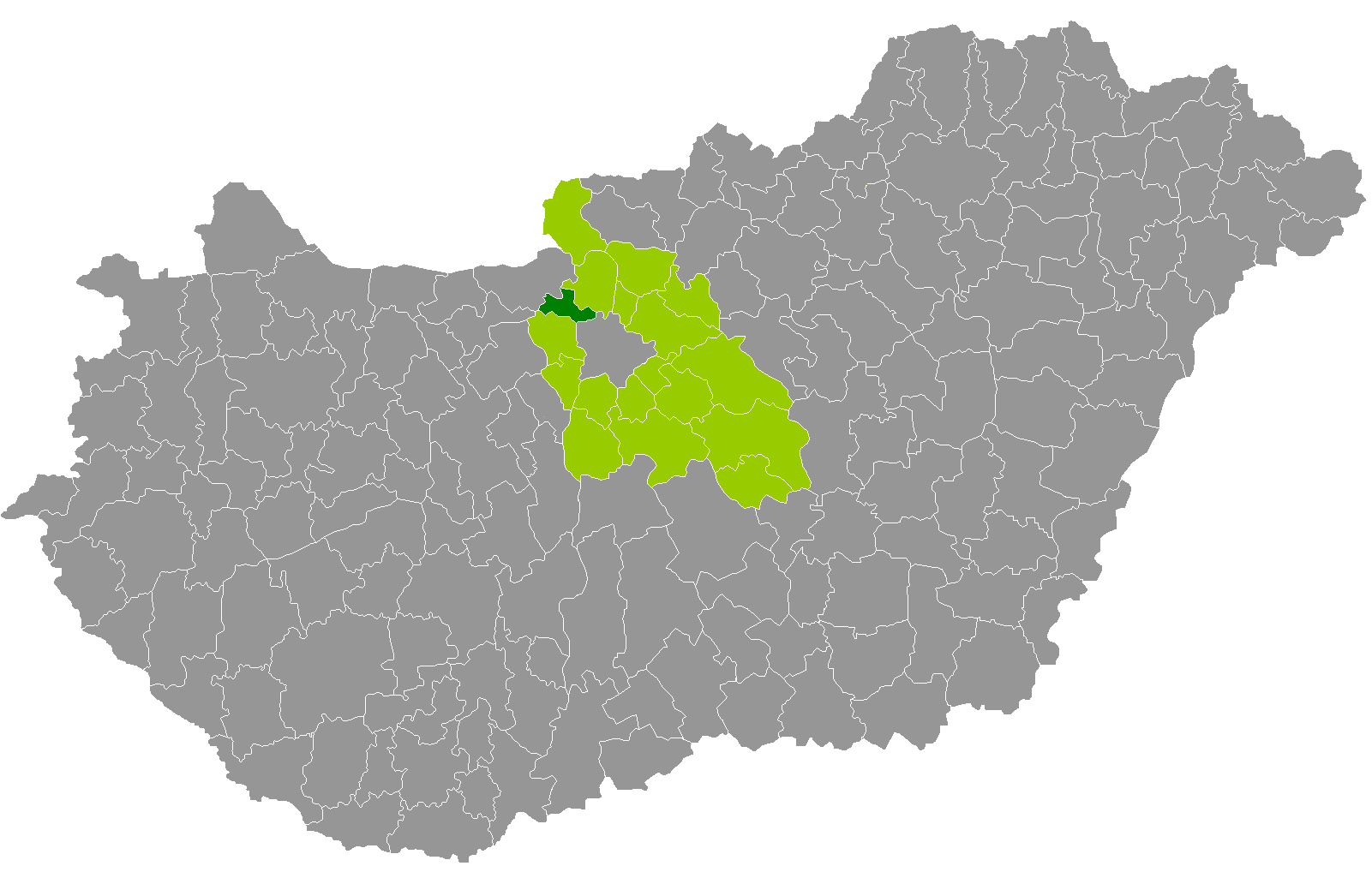
- Pilisvörösvár District within Hungary and Pest County.
- Country: Hungary
- County: Pest
- District seat: Pilisvörösvár

Area
  - Total: 130.81 km^{2} (50.51 sq mi)
  - Rank: 16th in Pest

Population (2011 census)
  - Total: 53,201
  - Rank: 11th in Pest
  - Density: 407/km^{2} (1,050/sq mi)

Pilisvörösvár (Hungarian: Pilisvörösvári járás; German: Kreis Werischwar) is a district in north-western part of Pest County. Pilisvörösvár is also the name of the town where the district seat is found. The district is located in the Central Hungary Statistical Region.

== Geography ==
Pilisvörösvár District borders with Szentendre District to the northeast, Budapest to the southeast, Budakeszi District to the south, Esztergom District (Komárom-Esztergom County) to the northwest. The number of the inhabited places in Pilisvörösvár District is 9.

== Municipalities ==
The district has 2 towns, 1 large village and 6 villages. (ordered by population, as of 1 January 2013)

- Pilisborosjenő (3,481)
- **Piliscsaba** (7,950)
- Pilisjászfalu (1,571)
- Pilisszántó (2,865)
- Pilisszentiván (3,481)
- **Pilisvörösvár** (13,838) – district seat
- Solymár (9,901)
- Tinnye (1,604)
- Üröm (4,165)

The bolded municipalities are cities, italics municipality is large village.

== Demographics ==
Religion in Pilisvörösvár District (2011 census)
1. Catholic Church (44.1%)
2. Greek Catholicism (0.70%)
3. Calvinism (8.10%)
4. Lutheranism (1.20%)
5. Orthodoxy (0.20%)
6. Judaism (0.10%)
7. Other religions (2.20%)
8. Non-religious (14.2%)
9. Atheists (1.80%)
10. Undeclared (27.4%)

In 2011, it had a population of 53,201 and the population density was 407/km².

Year	County population	Change
2011	53,201	n/a

=== Ethnicity ===
Besides Hungarian majority, the main minorities are the German (approx. 7,000), Slovak (1,100), Roma (500), Russian and Romanian (150).

Total population (2011 census): 53,201
Ethnic groups (2011 census): Identified themselves: 56,661 persons:

- Hungarians: 46,448 (81.98%)
- Germans: 7,231 (12.76%)
- Slovaks: 1,097 (1.94%)
- Others and indefinable: 1,885 (3.33%)

Approx. 3,500 persons in Pilisvörösvár District did declare more than one ethnic group at the 2011 census.

=== Religion ===
Religious adherence in the county according to 2011 census:

- Catholic – 23,848 (Roman Catholic – 23,458; Greek Catholic – 384);
- Reformed – 4,318;
- Evangelical – 652;
- Orthodox – 78;
- Judaism – 76;
- other religions – 1,153;
- Non-religious – 7,577;
- Atheism – 979;
- Undeclared – 14,520.

== Gallery ==
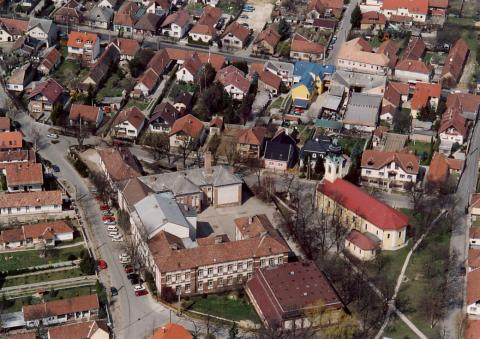
Downtown of Pilisvörösvár

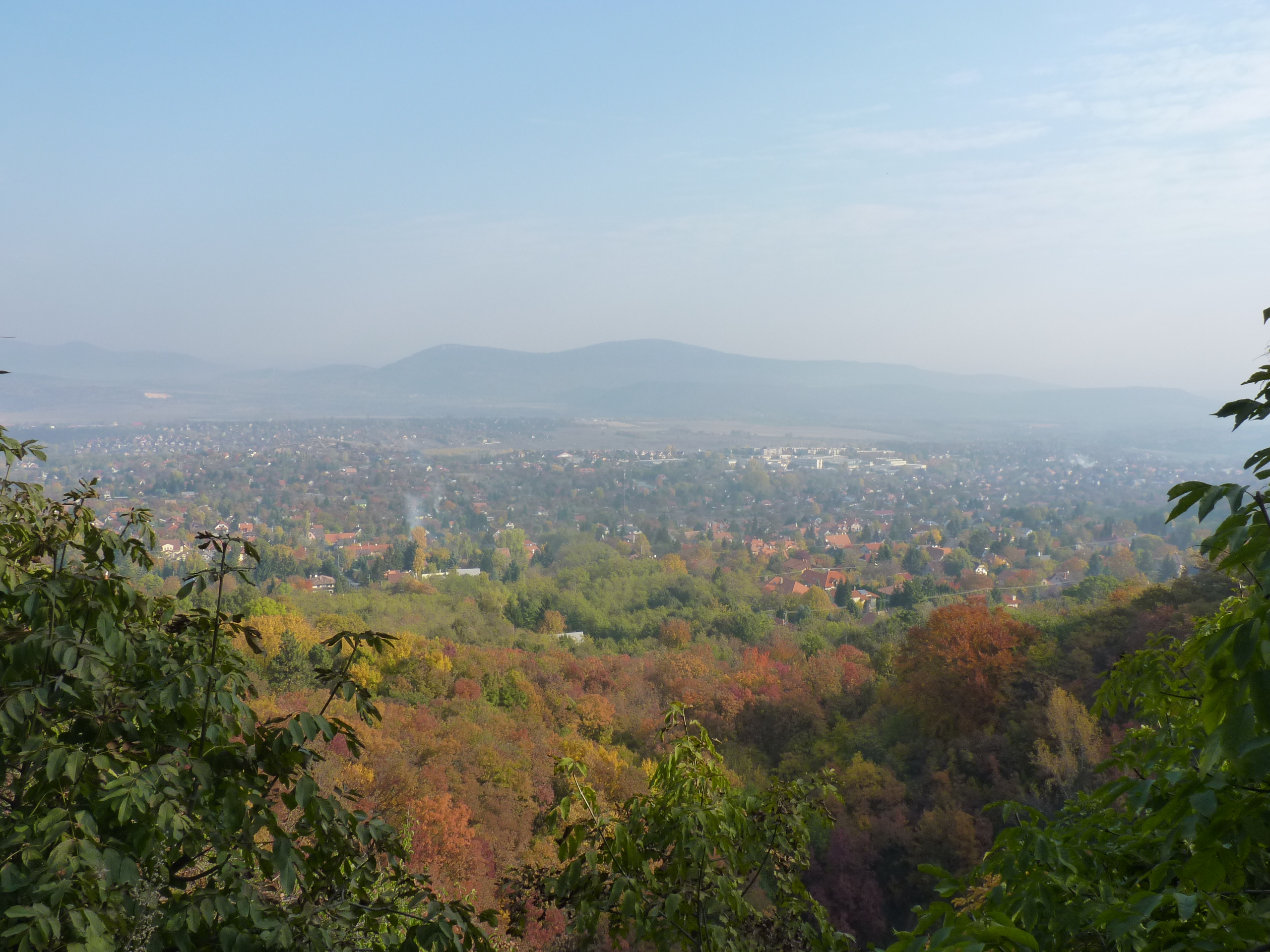
Panorama of Solymár

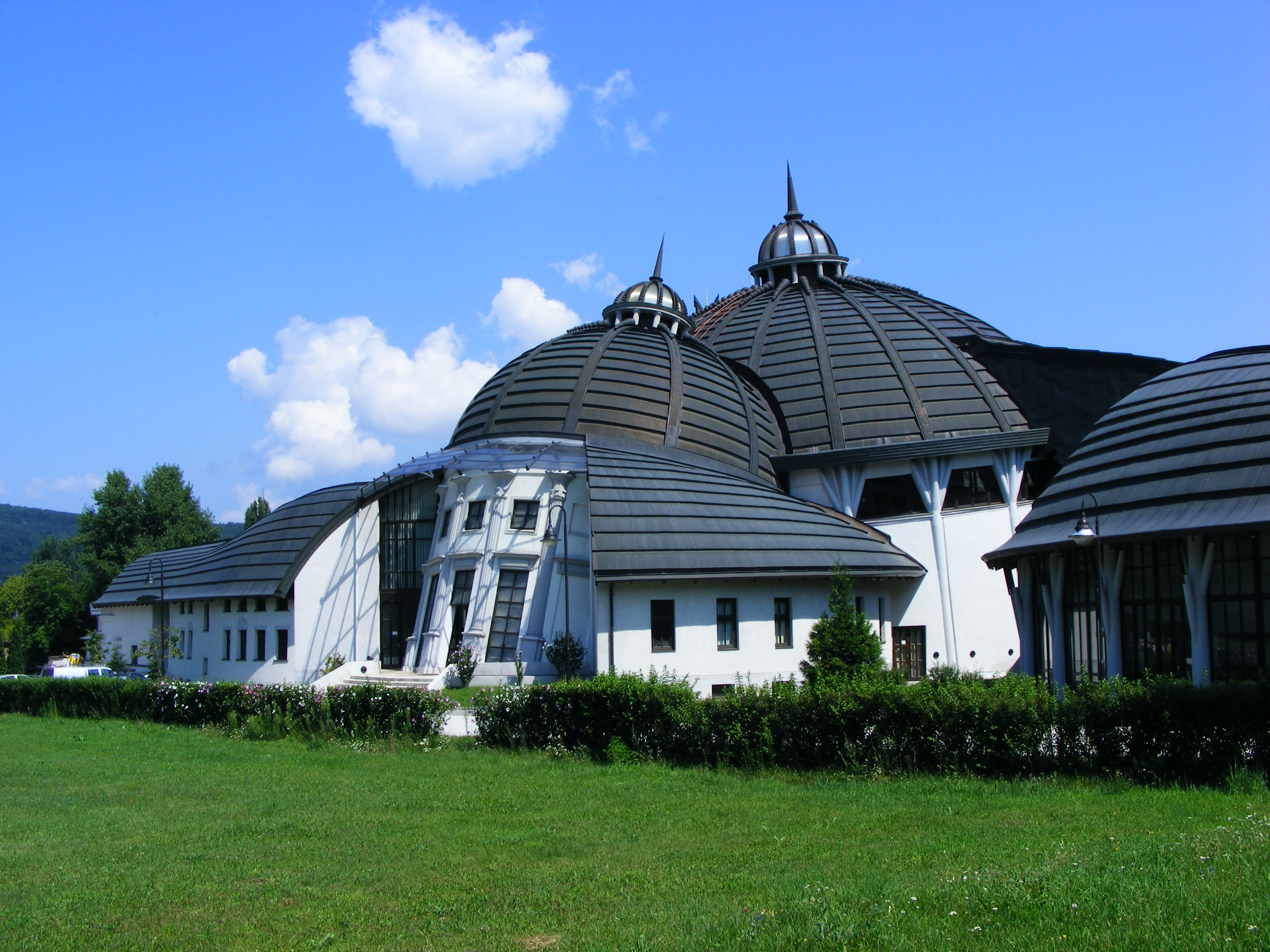
Pázmány Péter Catholic University in Piliscsaba

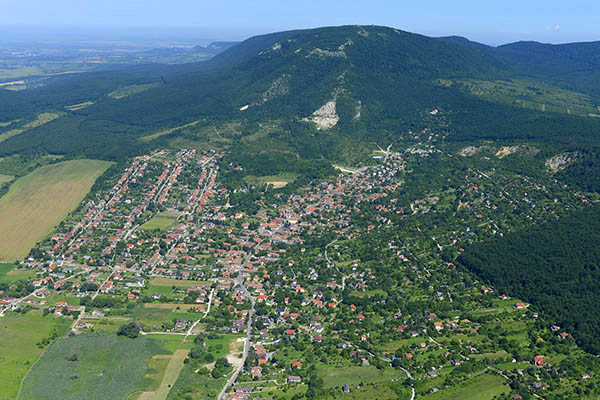
Aerial view of Pilisszántó

== See also ==
- List of cities and towns in Hungary
