= Solymár =

Solymár Schaumar
- Location of Solymár
- Coordinates: 47.591°N 18.929°E
- Country: Hungary
- County: Pest County

Area
  - Total: 17.86 km^{2} (6.90 sq mi)

Population (2005)
  - Total: 9,455
  - Density: 567/km^{2} (1,470/sq mi)
- Time zone: UTC+1 (CET)
  - Summer (DST): UTC+2 (CEST)
- Postal code: 2083
- Area code: 26

Solymár (German: Schaumar) is a village in northwest of Budapest metropolitan area, bordering the 3rd and 2nd districts of the city, as well as Nagykovácsi, Pilisszentiván, Pilisvörösvár, Csobánka, Pilisborosjenő, and Üröm. Its picturesque surroundings (hills to the south and east, the highest point is Zsíroshegy at 424m) and good accessibility the 64, 64A, 64B, 164, 164B, 264, 157 and 964 city buses from Hűvösvölgy, 218 from Óbuda, 831 from Pilisszántó, a train from Budapest Nyugati and Esztergom, and coaches from Árpád-híd made it a desirable destination for affluent city-dwellers moving to suburban homes outside of Budapest from the mid-1990s. Its historical German-speaking majority was depopulated following the Second World War, some non-compulsively, and a great majority by force in a series of deportations, which is solemnly remembered in a commemorative monument erected in the village in 1990.

== History ==
The name of the village is first mentioned in a charter by Béla IV dated 5 May 1266, as Solomar. The most likely etymology of the name is Hungarian solymár (more commonly solymász): ‘falconer’, i.e., the place where the royal falconers live. (Several neighbouring villages were named similarly.) The village prospered during the following centuries and probably hosted a royal hunting castle (Szarkavár), which burnt down after 1561. The advance of the Ottoman Empire left the village deserted after 1580.

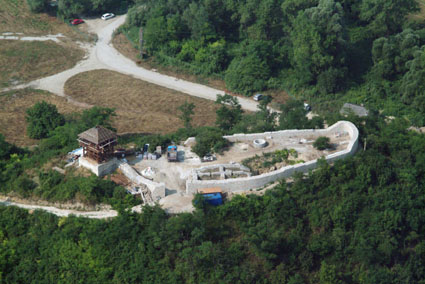
Solymár - Remains of castle, from above

The village was uninhabited until the first new settlers arrived around 1700; first Serbs and Bulgarians migrated from the south, to escape the withdrawing Ottoman forces. Soon afterward came Bavarian immigrants, recruited by the monarchy from Habsburg and similar southern provinces along the Danube. The Crown paid their transportation and assisted in their getting settled in Hungary; the newcomers were promised they could retain their language and religion (generally Roman Catholic). The monarchy wanted to resettle the area and knew the Germans could restore farmlands along the Danube. Because the settlers continued to speak a form of German and maintained their cultural and religious traditions, they were called Danube Swabians. Their descendants, who were citizens of the Austro-Hungarian Empire and succeeding governments, later formed the great majority of the population in this area and called the village Schaumar in German.

== Post-war Magyarization ==
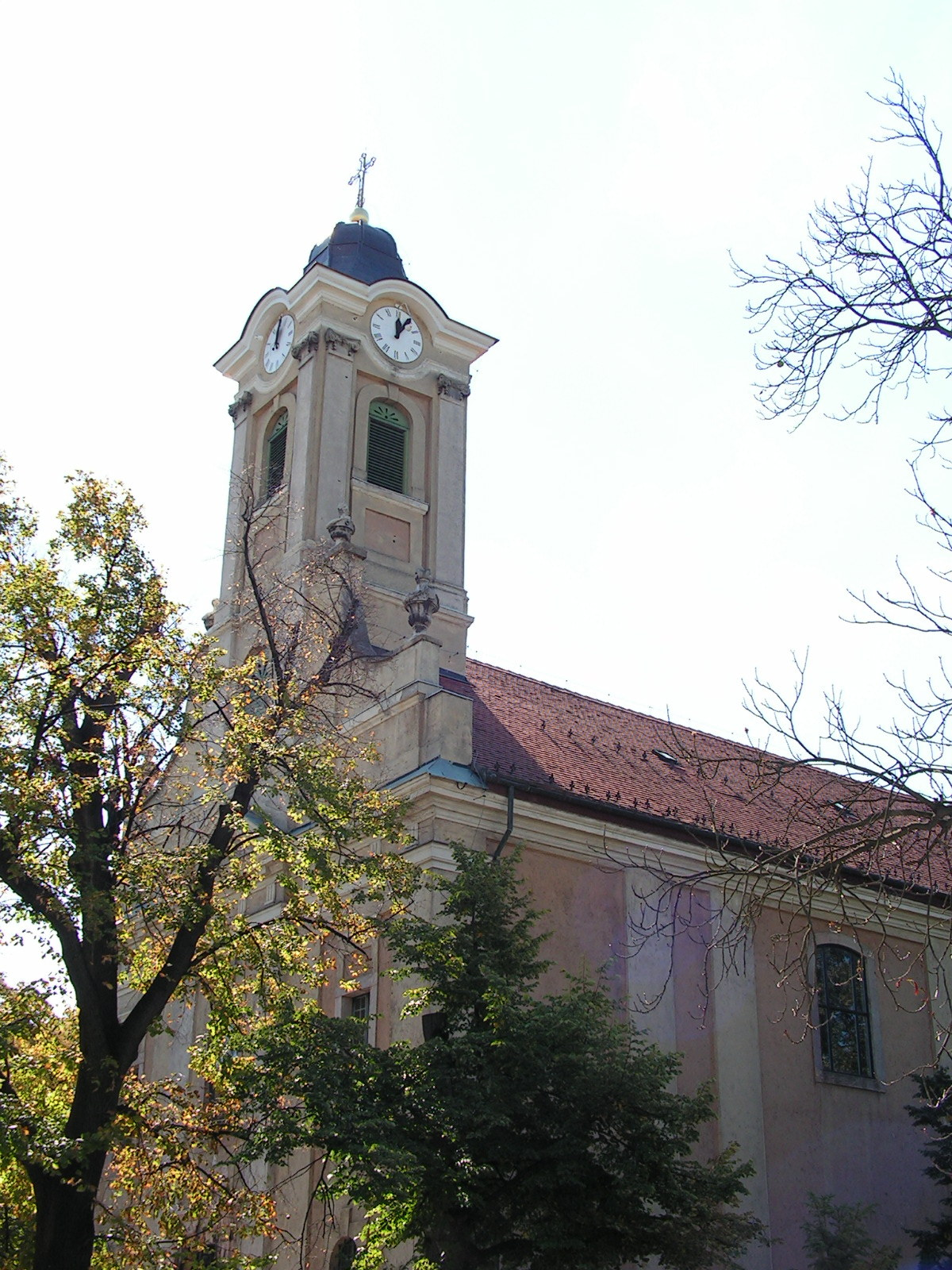
The Catholic church in Templom tér, built 1782–1785

During World War II, Adolf Hitler appealed to ethnic Germans in other countries, no matter how long they had resided there. In some areas, ethnic Germans supported his program, but in many cases had loyalty to where they were living. Because part of the Nazi rationale for war was to unite all ethnic Germans and oppress and exterminate other populations, many eastern European countries, such as Hungary, Poland and the Soviet Union, expelled ethnic Germans after the war. About half the population of Solymár was deported to Germany in 1946 as a collective punishment as part of that massive displacement. More than 330 households in Solymár were vacated.

The empty houses were occupied by ethnic Hungarians relocated from other parts of the country (mainly Mezőkövesd), as well as refugees from Transylvania. In later years, ethnic Hungarians deported from Czechoslovakia arrived. Together with the large-scale migration of people from Budapest in the past decades of suburbanization, ethnic Germans have become a minority of the population. Since 1990 the deportation has been commemorated; a memorial was installed at Templom tér.

== Attractions ==
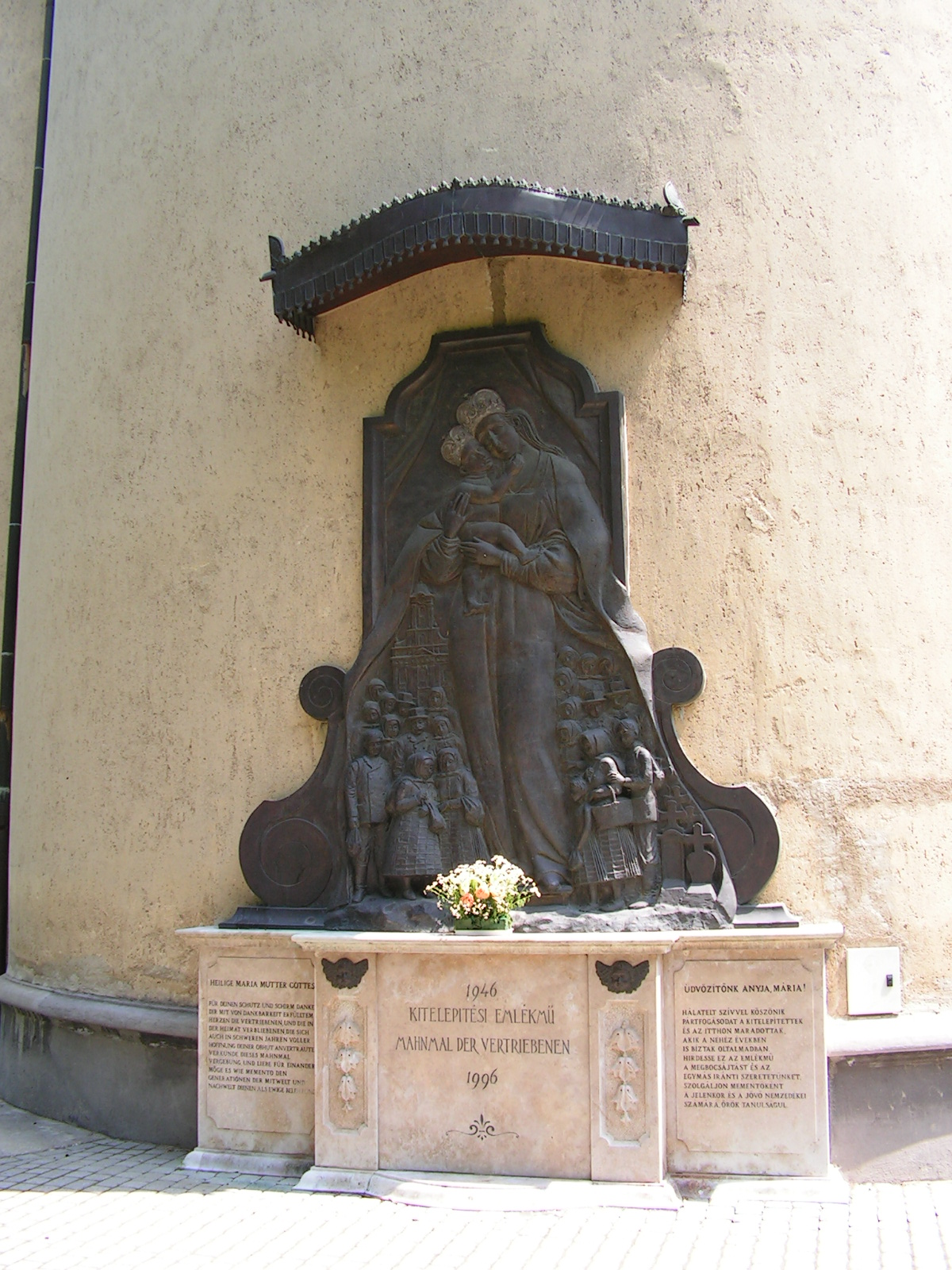
The Deportation Memorial in Templom tér

- Historic Catholic church and other buildings in the village
- Hilltop ruins of a castle
- Budapest War Cemetery contains 173 Commonwealth burials of the Second World War, all of them airmen whose graves were brought in from sites all over Hungary after the war, plus a single First World War burial. The cemetery also contains one French and 37 Polish War Graves.
- On the slope of Zsiros Hill is the opening to the Devil's Hole Cave (Ördöglyuk-barlang), an extensive system approximately 3 kilometres long. It is possible for experienced spelunkers to explore the caves with a guide, but it is not otherwise accessible.

== Population ==
As of 2022, there are 11,220 residents, mainly ethnic Hungarians, with a minority of ethnic Germans, mainly those who returned after the war.

== Mayors ==
- 1990–1994: Péter Dercsényi (Alliance of Free Democrats (SZDSZ))
- 1994–2006: László Enczmann (independent)
- 2006–2010: Kálmán Szente (independent)
- 2010–2024: Kálmán Szente (FIDESZ-KDNP)
- 2024– : Péter Zlinszky (TESO/Let's Act Together for Solymár Association)
