= Hadházy =

Hadházy is a surname. Notable people with the surname include:

- Ákos Hadházy (born 1974), Hungarian veterinarian and politician
- Peter Hadhazy (1944–2006), American football executive
- Sándor Hadházy (born 1956), Hungarian water engineer and politician
