= Nagykovácsi =

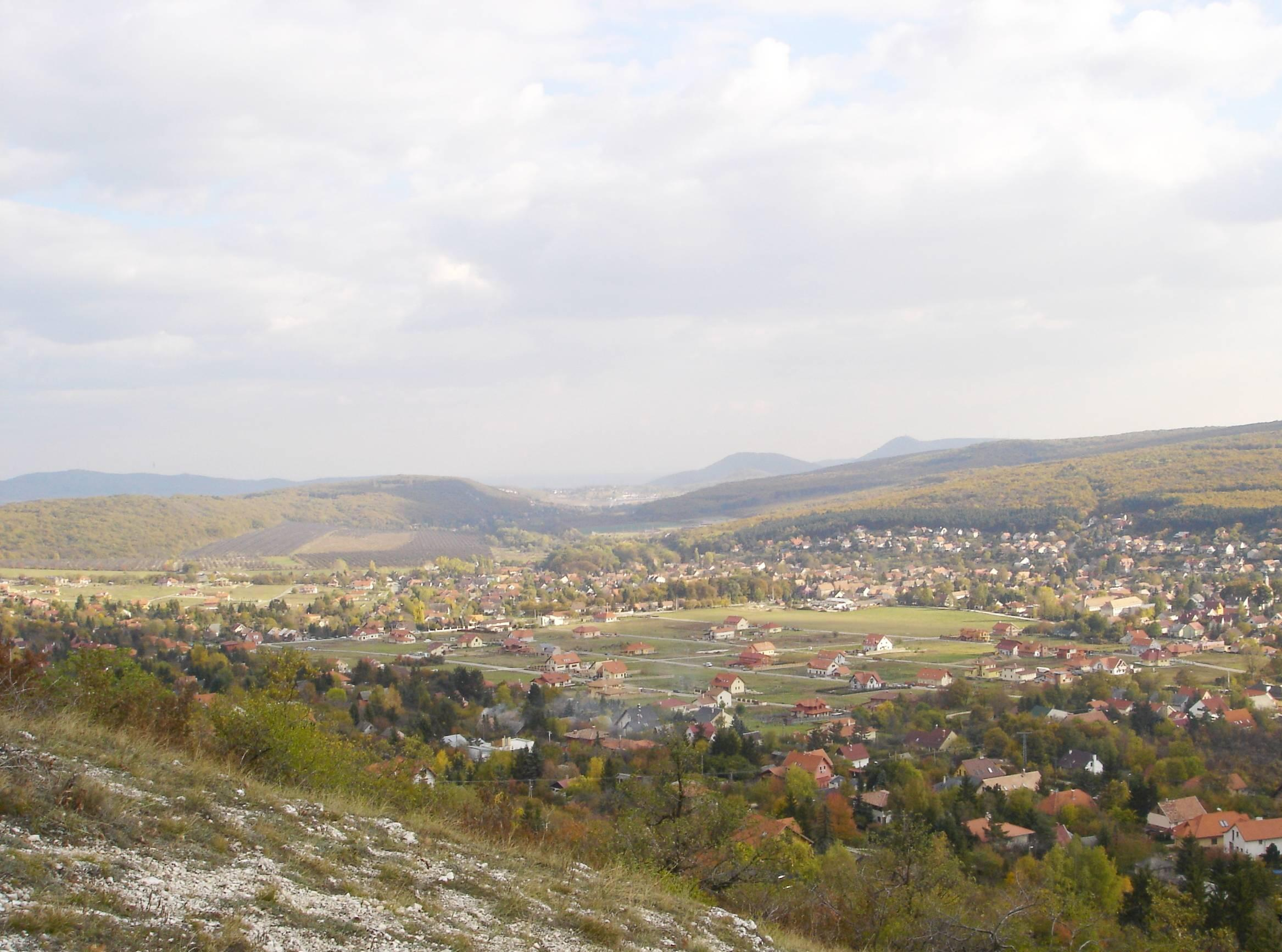
- Nagykovácsi seen from a nearby hill

- Flag Coat of arms

- Location of Nagykovácsi
- Coordinates: 47.58°N 18.88°E
- Country: Hungary
- County: Pest

Area
  - Total: 14.14 km^{2} (5.46 sq mi)

Population (2025)
  - Total: 8,757
- Time zone: UTC+1 (CET)
  - Summer (DST): UTC+2 (CEST)
- Postal code: 2094
- Area code: 26
- Website: www.nagykovacsi.hu

Nagykovácsi (German: Großkowatsch) is a small town located in Budakeszi District, in the western part of Pest county, central Hungary. It is situated some 15 km (9 mi) north-west of the centre of Budapest, in a valley. According to the 2025 census, the population amounted to 8757, though this figure does not include individuals who own property as a secondary residence in the town. Nagykovácsi today attracts tourists and new residents alike, due to its proximity to Budapest, attractive and peaceful setting, surrounding by hills and forests. Some of the nearby areas have been designated conservation areas—Budai Tájvédelmi Körzet (the "Buda Land Protection Area")—in order to protect several of its rare species of flora. Its location has contributed to the town's development in recent decade. The American International School of Budapest chose Nagykovácsi as the site for its new campus in 2000.

== History ==
Archaeological findings indicate that this region has been inhabited since prehistory. Ancient objects found in the caves of the Remete ravine and along the banks of Ördög-árok indicate that people lived there during the Ice, Iron, and Stone ages. Various tools, coins and fragments of stone statues unearthed in the area show that there were inhabitants, too, under the Roman Empire. Of these stone fragments, four tombstones from ancient Rome were embedded in the wall of the local church when it was built. In medieval records, Nagykovácsi is referred to as Koachi and Kowachy. These names indicate that royal smiths viz. ironsmiths (kovács) lived in the town.

The first local document still in existence, a deed of gift, dates from 1254. During the Turkish occupation in Hungary, in the middle of the 16th century, the village suffered much destruction and the population fell sharply. Once the Turks had been driven out, the Habsburg family who reigned in Hungary invited Bavariann colonists to settle in Kovácsi (1700–1760). These newcomers were stockbreeders and farmers and also built three quarries, a coal-mine and two lime kilns, and named Danube Swabians from Ofener Bergland.

Many of the German-speaking Danube Swabians population of the town were forcibly resettled after the Second World War and new inhabitants arrived from the Hungarian Great Plains (Alföld), the parts of Upper Hungary (Felvidék) (today in Slovakia), and from Budapest to take their place.

The manor house in Nagykovácsi was built in first half of the 19th century by the local Teleki family. Thereafter the property passed into the hands of the Tisza family and today it is known still as the Tisza Manor. Originally the children of Hungarian foresters received regular school teaching in this well-preserved building. The idea of gathering such children into an educational establishment was gradually recognized as a worthwhile initiative throughout Europe and attracted visitors from many countries. At the end of the Second World War, the manor was confiscated and from 1958 it served as an agricultural college. Ownership of the property was passed to the Scout Movement in 2013.

Today local townspeople make every effort to protect local sights, amongst these the statue of the Virgin Mary in the church and a memorial to the fallen of both world wars.

== Items of local interest ==
- The American International School of Budapest is situated in Nagykovácsi.
- One of the rarest plants in the world, the dolomite flax (Linum dolomiticum), an ancient breed of shrub, is preserved on a strictly protected 10-acre (40,000 m^{2}) plot in the hills between Nagykovácsi and the neighbouring village of Pilisszentiván. It is the only known locale for this plant.

== Twin towns – sister cities ==
Nagykovácsi is twinned with:

- Andovce, Slovakia
- Bolatice, Czech Republic
- Canéjan, France
- Linum (Fehrbellin), Germany
- Poggio Mirteto, Italy
- Stupava, Slovakia
- Zografou, Greece
- Tutrakan, Bulgaria

== Gallery ==
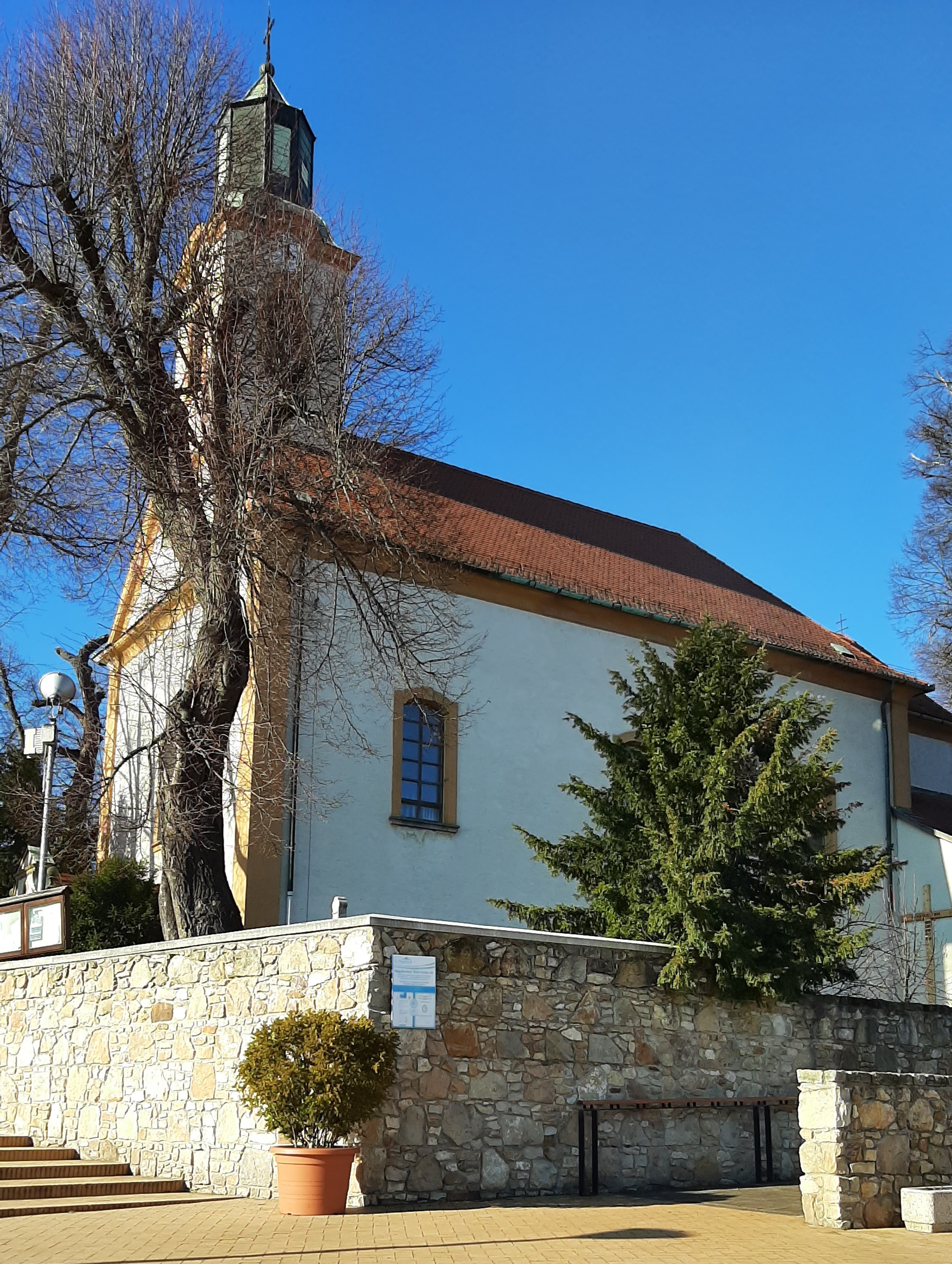
The church in Nagykovácsi in Tisza István tér

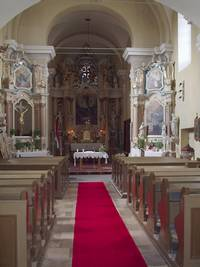
Nagykovácsi Church interior

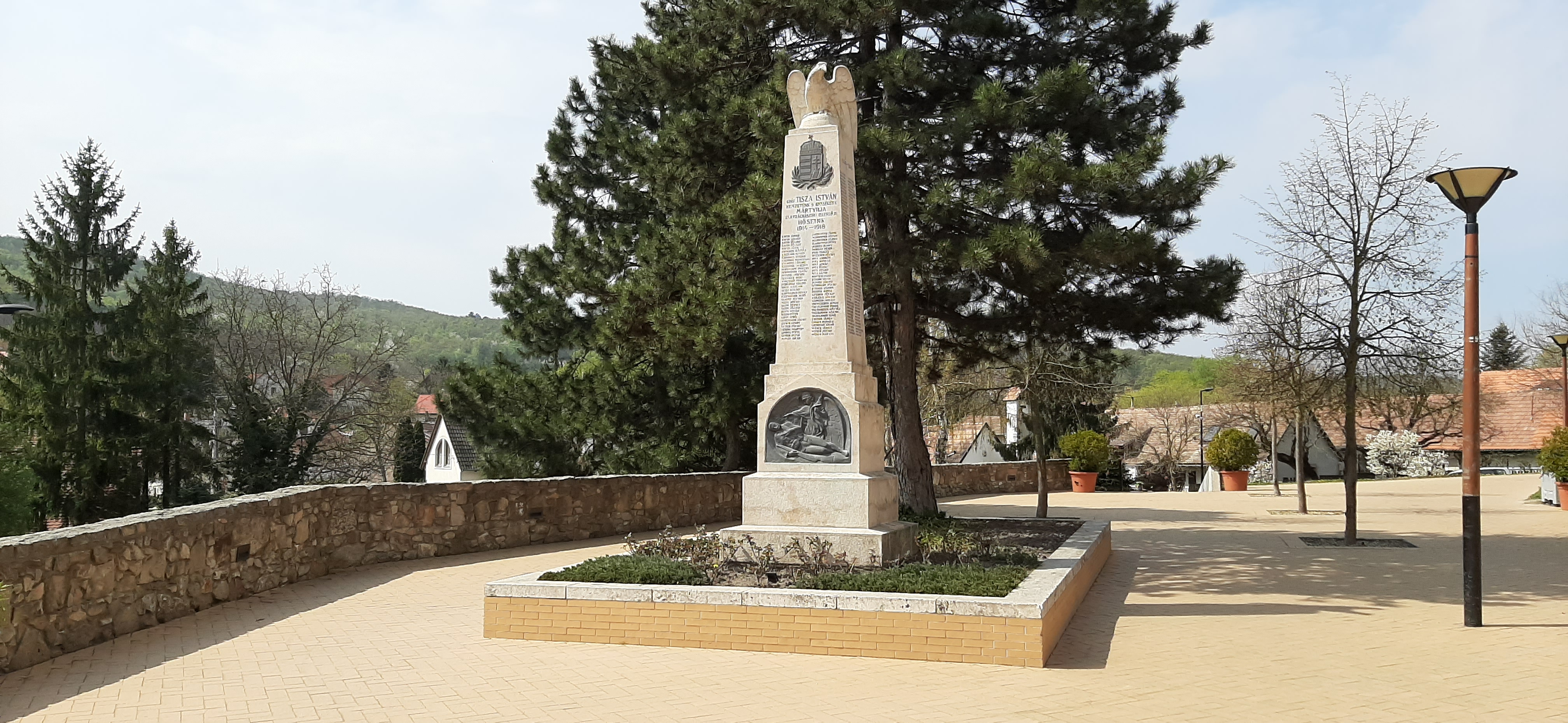
War memorial in Nagykovácsi

Dolomite flax (Linum dolomiticum)

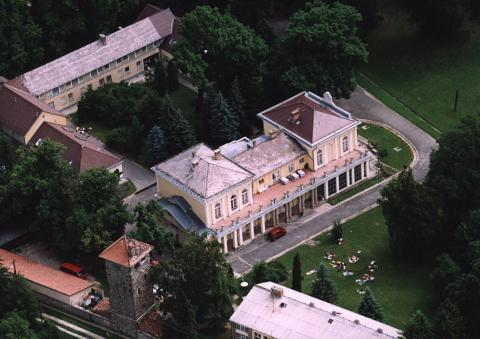
Nagykovácsi - The Manor House from above
