= American International School of Budapest =

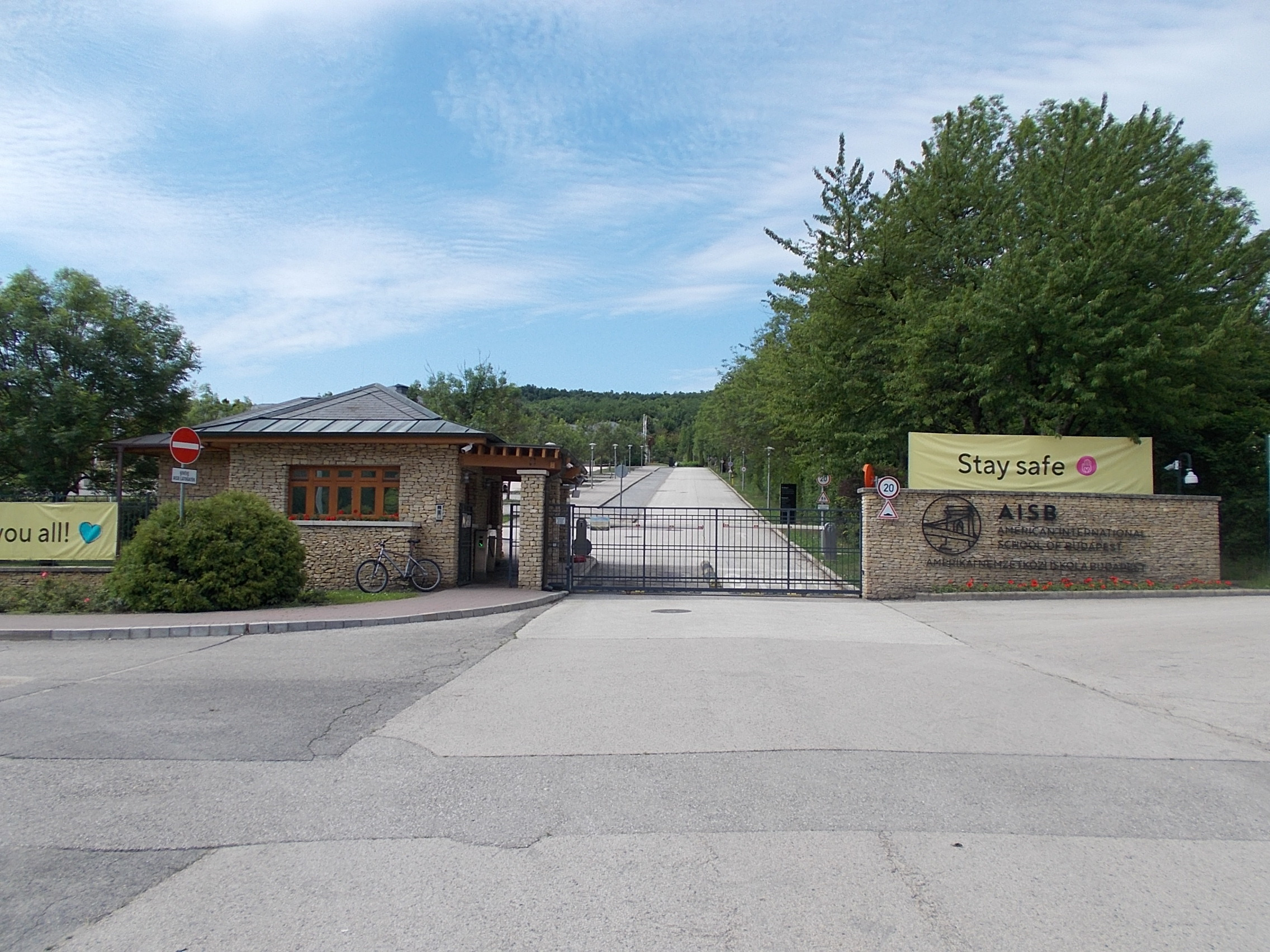

Location
- Nagykovácsi; Hungary
- Coordinates: 47°34′10″N 18°54′0″E

Information
- Type: International School
- Motto: We empower learners to build their futures and contribute to a better world.
- Established: 1973
- Director: Mr. Brett Penny
- Principals: High-School: Mr. Graham Maclure; Middle-School: Mr. Andrew Ball; Elementary School: Mr. George Dolesch
- Faculty: Elementary, Middle and High-School staff
- Grades: Pre-K - 12
- Enrollment: 965
- Mascot: Sparky (Blazers)
- Teams: The Budapest Blazers
- Website: www.aisb.hu

The American International School of Budapest (also known as AISB) is an international school located in Nagykovácsi, Hungary, near Budapest. It was established in 1973 by the United States Embassy to serve United States Government employees' dependents; however, it now has a much more diverse student body including children of the local and expatriate business and diplomatic communities. English is the primary medium of instruction. The school's website reports that it serves a population of about 950 students from 57 countries.

AISB previously occupied two purpose-built campuses in Budapest; however, the school has since moved to one main campus located in Nagykovácsi. Pre-Kindergarten - Grade 2 (lower elementary) were housed at the Buda Campus (on Kakukk út) in the Buda Hills. Grades 3 - 12 (upper elementary, middle and high school) shared the Nagykovácsi Campus located just 13 kilometers from the center of Budapest. Currently, the Nagykovácsi campus holds three buildings: Building B for grades 6 - 12, Building A for Pre - Kindergarten - grade 5, and Building C — a general field house.

The school operates five divisions on one campus; the Early Childhood division and the Elementary School share Building A, while Middle School, High School and the Athletics Center are located in Building B. Building A, known as the primary school building, houses PK-grade 5 and has its own library, multi-purpose room and gym. Building B, which houses grades 6–12, was built in 2000, and is complete with 54 classrooms, library, cafeteria, double-sized gymnasium, 25-meter indoor swimming pool, 350-seat theatre, performing and visual arts facilities, and playfield (these facilities are also shared with the Lower school). Building C is a medium-sized fieldhouse located next to the running tracks.

A bridge connects Building A and Building B — the two main buildings.

In 2022, AISB began hosting a school for Ukrainian refugees. The AISB provided older laptops and iPads, and helped Ukrainian students join online classes streamed from their home institutions. ”We felt that if we had the space, we would use the expertise that was here, the Ukrainian teachers that had moved here…so that children could move back into their home language as quickly as possible,” says AISB Director Brett Penny in a documentary about the "School within a School" project.

== Sport ==
In the summer/fall the school offers soccer/football, tennis and cross country. After training (5 weeks, 2-4 times a week) there is a sports event with the other international schools in East and Central Europe, under the CEESA (Central and Eastern European Schools Association) organization. AISB athletes also participate in Danube Valley Athletic Conferences (DVAC).

In winter there is basketball and swimming. In spring, there is volleyball, softball, and track & field.
