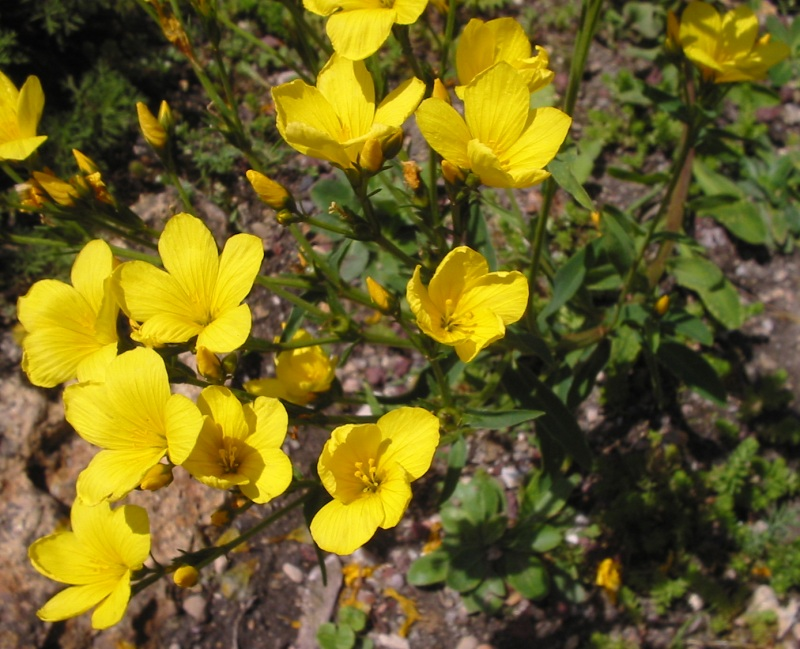

Conservation status
- Data Deficient (IUCN 3.1)

Scientific classification
- Kingdom: Plantae
- Clade: Tracheophytes
- Clade: Angiosperms
- Clade: Eudicots
- Clade: Rosids
- Order: Malpighiales
- Family: Linaceae
- Genus: Linum
- Species: L. dolomiticum

Binomial name
- Linum dolomiticum Borbás

= Linum dolomiticum =

Species of flowering plant

Linum dolomiticum is a perennial plant in the flax family Linaceae. Found exclusively on dolomite hills near Budapest, Hungary, this perennial species occupies an extremely small range of just one square kilometre, making it one of Europe's most geographically restricted endemic plants. First described in 1897, it grows in both sunny southern-facing open grasslands and shadier northern-facing closed grasslands, often showing a patchy distribution with dense clusters separated by unoccupied areas. Despite maintaining a stable population of approximately 30,000–40,000 individuals and being protected under European conservation legislation, L. dolomiticum remains vulnerable due to recreational activities and wildlife damage in its limited habitat.

== Habitat, distribution, and ecology ==
Linum dolomiticum is an endemic, pre-glacial relic plant species native to Hungary. This species has an extremely narrow distribution, found only on dolomite hills in a region of roughly one square kilometre in the Buda Hills near Pilisszentiván (47° 36' N, 18° 52' E). it exists as a single population consisting of several stands separated by closed deciduous forest.

The species has a unique distribution pattern, showing preferences for two distinct vegetation types. Closed dolomite grasslands are found in northern and northwestern exposures, often with 90–100% vegetation cover. These areas feature L. dolomiticum growing alongside species such as Anthericum ramosum, Anthyllis vulneraria, Carex humilis, and Fraxinus ornus. In contrast, open dolomite rock grasslands are found in southern and southwestern exposures with much lower vegetation cover (5–25%). in these habitats, L. dolomiticum is associated with species including Alyssum tortuosum, Euphorbia seguieriana, Fumana procumbens, and Jovibarba hirta.

The plant occasionally appears in the herb layer of open Quercus pubescens (downy oak) woodlands and rarely in rock steppe habitats.

The distribution of L. dolomiticum shows a peculiar pattern – in certain patches, the plant occurs in rather high density, but these alternate with large "empty" areas where it does not occur at all. No other plant species has been found to be significantly associated with L. dolomiticum, suggesting its distribution may be determined by factors other than co-occurring plant species, possibly including the distribution of mycorrhizal fungi partners.

Research by Dobolyi has revealed an important survival mechanism in L. dolomiticum. Population monitoring studies conducted between 2001 and 2005 showed that about 20% of individuals disappear and reappear over a two-year period, while the total population size remains essentially stable. Further observation confirmed that individuals recorded as "disappeared" often reappear several years later, and at sizes indicating they are not new seedlings. This suggests the species possesses a dormancy strategy, enabling it to survive underground during unfavourable conditions such as drought years without producing above-ground shoots. This adaptation likely plays a fundamental role in the plant's persistence despite its extremely restricted range and helps explain its peculiar distribution pattern. Herbarium studies indicate that superficially separate shoots may be connected by thin underground structures, forming larger genetic individuals.

Linum dolomiticum appears to tolerate different ecological circumstances, growing in both xeric (dry) southern-facing slopes and more mesic (moderately moist) northern-facing areas. It demonstrates adaptability to various levels of vegetation cover, from sparse open communities to more closed grassland systems.

== Conservation ==
Linum dolomiticum faces significant conservation challenges despite having a relatively stable population of 30,000–40,000 individuals. The species is classified as critically endangered on the Hungarian national Red List and data deficient by the IUCN, with its extremely restricted geographic range (only 100 km^{2}) making it inherently vulnerable. Major threats include recreational activities such as walking and vehicle traffic in its habitat, as well as damage caused by game species.

The species benefits from substantial legal protection as a priority species on Annex II of the EU Habitats Directive and Appendix I of the Bern Convention, with all known localities occurring within protected areas in Hungary. However, limited information about the number of locations, their fragmentation, and whether threats are causing continuing decline makes it difficult to fully assess conservation effectiveness. Given its uniquely restricted range and the potential importance of mycorrhizal associations in determining its distribution, continued monitoring and research remain essential for long-term conservation.
