= Tinnye =

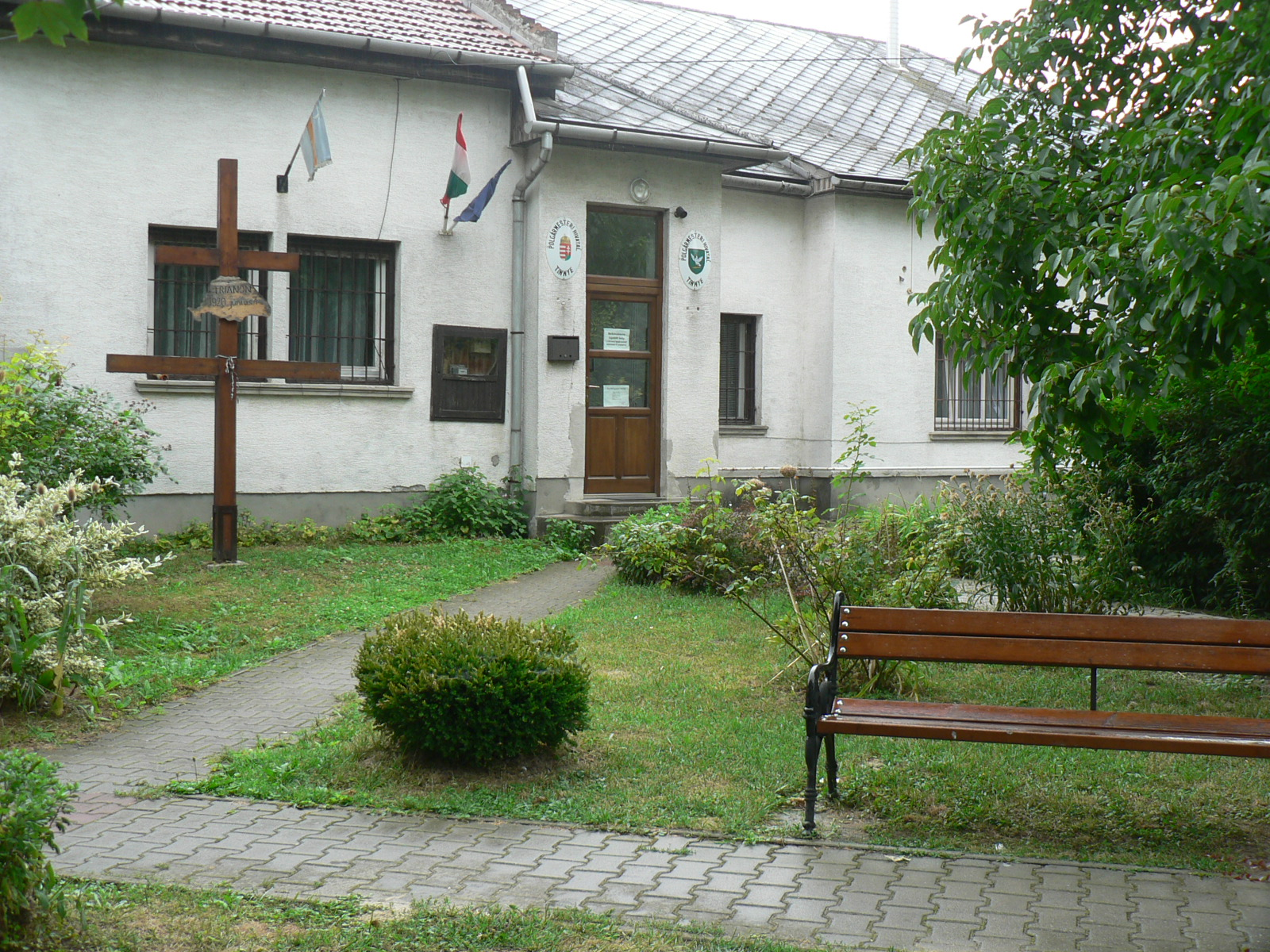
- Village hall

- Coat of arms

- Location of Tinnye in Hungary
- Coordinates: 47°37′12.00″N 18°46′41.63″E
- Country: Hungary
- Region: Central Hungary
- County: Pest
- Subregion: Pilisvörösvári
- Rank: Village

Area
  - Total: 16.10 km^{2} (6.22 sq mi)

Population (2023)https://www.ksh.hu/apps/hntr.telepules?p_lang=HU&p_id=07108
  - Total: 1,898
  - Density: 117.9/km^{2} (305.3/sq mi)
- Time zone: UTC+1 (CET)
  - Summer (DST): UTC+2 (CEST)
- Postal code: 2086
- Area code: +36 26
- KSH code: 07108
- Website: www.tinnye.hu

Tinnye is located in Pest County, within the Pilisvörösvár District, and forms part of the Budapest metropolitan area.

== Demographics ==
The population of Tinnye has grown steadily over the past several decades. In 1980, the population was 1,262, declining slightly to 1,118 by 1990. Since then, the village has experienced consistent growth: 1,288 in 2001, 1,607 in 2011, and reaching 1,946 in 2022.

== Points of Interest ==
Lake Garancsi, located just outside the village, serves as a local natural attraction and is frequented by nature enthusiasts. The village also hosts a Reformed Church, representative of traditional rural religious architecture in Hungary.

== Geography ==
It lies in the Central Hungarian region, characterized by a landscape of plains and low hills. The village covers an area of 16.10 square kilometers and is situated near Lake Garancsi (Garancsi-tó), a small freshwater lake surrounded by forest, popular for hiking, fishing, and other outdoor recreational activities.

=== Lakes ===
- Lake Garancsi
