= Sándor Hadházy =

Hungarian politician (born 1956)

Member of the National Assembly
- Incumbent
- Assumed office 18 June 1998

Personal details
- Born: 10 August 1956 (age 69) Derecske, Hungary
- Party: Fidesz (since 1998)
- Spouse: Dr Zsuzsanna Judit Homor
- Children: 2
- Profession: water engineer, politician

Sándor Hadházy (born 10 August 1956) is a Hungarian water engineer and politician, member of the National Assembly (MP) for Szentendre (Pest County Constituency XI then III) since 1998. Hadházy also served as Mayor of Visegrád between 1990 and 2010.

== Career ==
He started his political career upon public request in 1990. He was elected mayor of Visegrád in the local elections, he was elected incumbent individual mayor four years later. He was elected to the Pest County General Assembly in 1990, and in 1994 he was group leader of the Federation of Local Governments from 1994. He joined the Szentendre branch of Fidesz in 1988.

In the local elections, supported by FIDESZ-MPP, he was elected incumbent mayor of Visegrád for the third time. He made it to the County Assembly as well. In the 1998 parliamentary elections, and again in the 2002 parliamentary elections, he was elected individual MP for his Szentendre constituency (Constituency XI, Pest County). In the 2002 autumn local elections he was elected mayor of Visegrád for the fourth time.

He could repeat his success as MP for the third and fourth time in 2006 and 2010. He was a member of the Committee on Sport and Tourism from 30 May 2006 to 5 May 2014. However, Hadházy lost his mayoral seat to an independent candidate Géza Abonyi in the 2010 local elections.

== Personal life ==
He is married. His wife is Dr Zsuzsanna Judit Homor. They have two sons.
