= Lake Garancsi =

Lake in Hungary

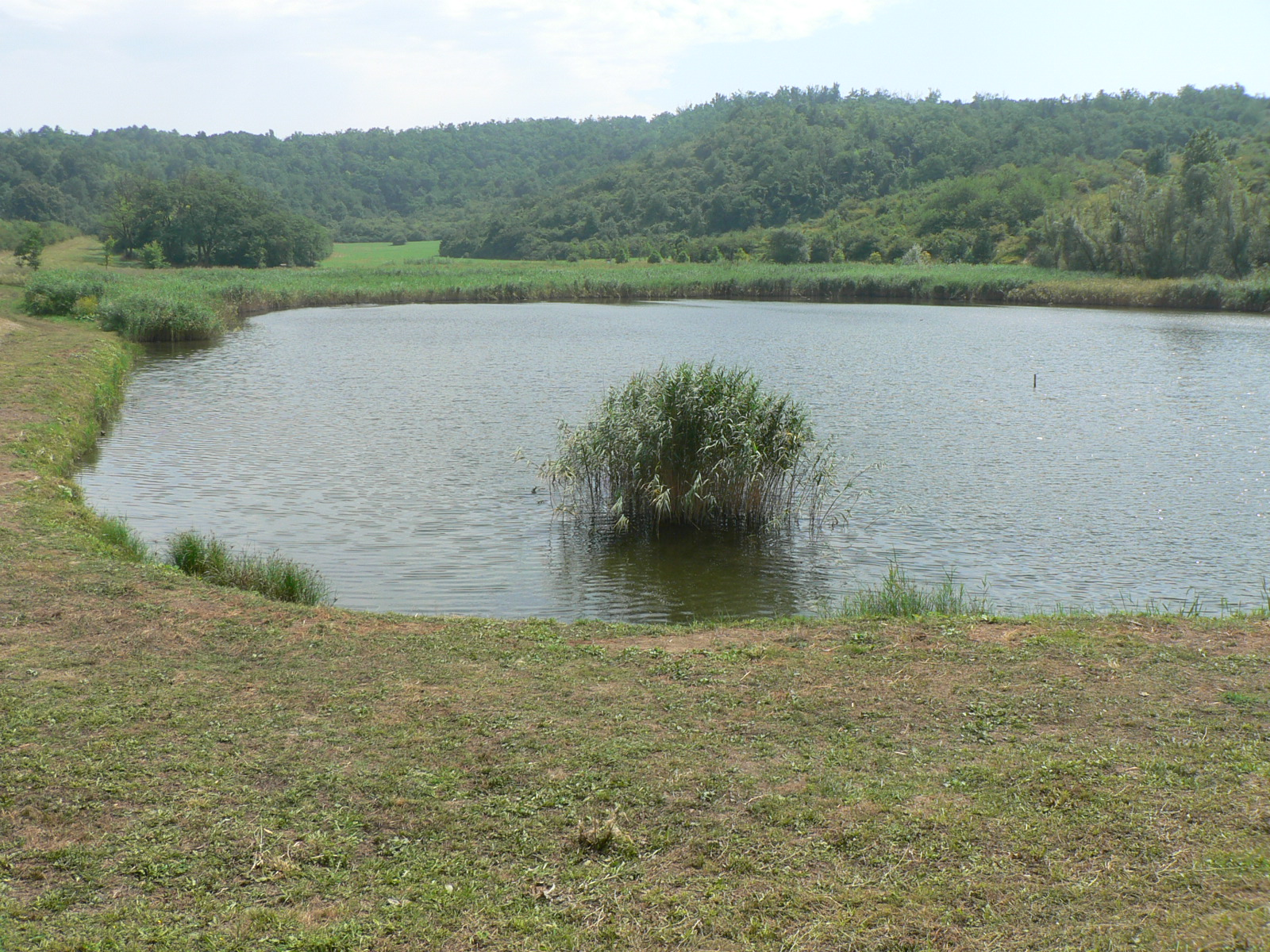

- Location within Hungary
- Coordinates: 47°37′24″N 18°48′26″E
- Basin countries: Hungary

Lake Garancsi is a lake of Hungary.
