= György Buzinkay =

Politician from Hungary

- Buzinkay György
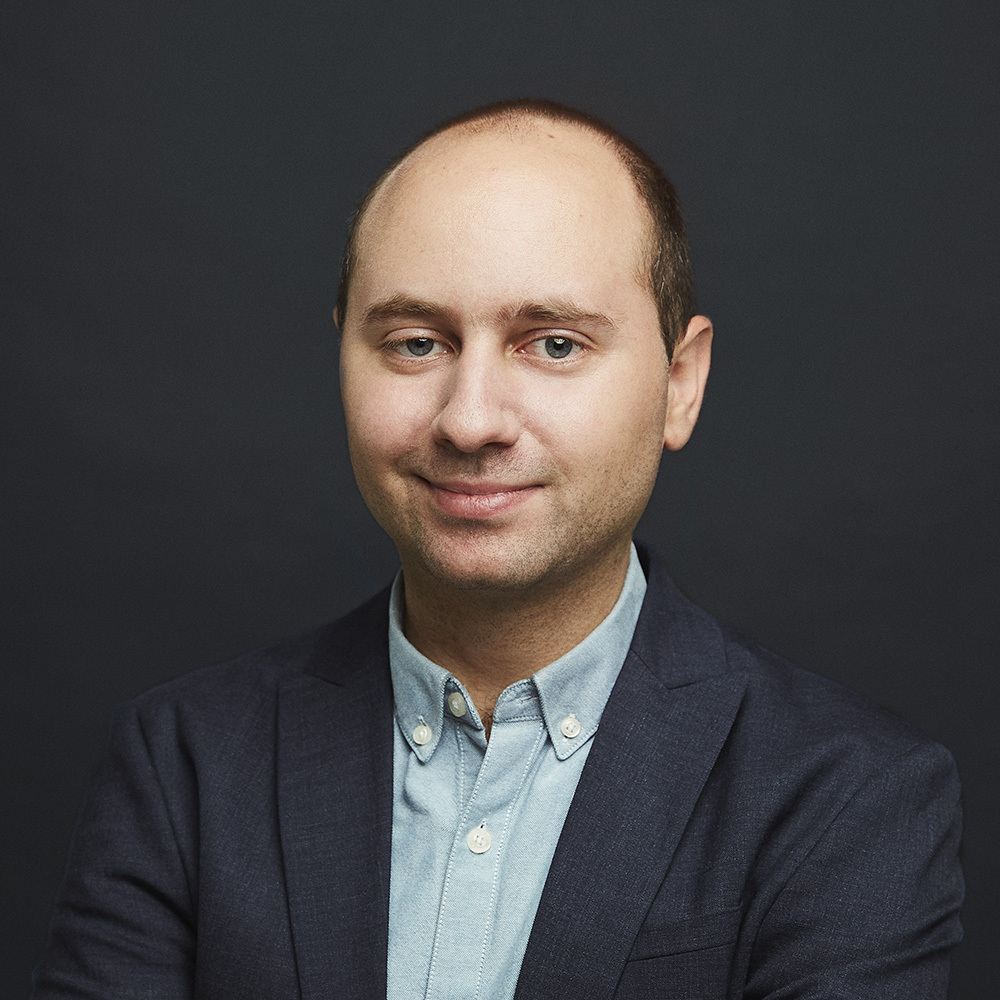
- Born: August 9, 1989 (age 36); Budapest
- Education: Toldy Ferenc High School; Eötvös Loránd University; Corvinus University of Budapest
- Occupation: Politician
- Title: Chairman of Momentum Movement
- Term: June 2018 - June 2020
- Political party: Momentum Movement (2017-2022); Democratic Coalition (Hungary) (2022-)

György Buzinkay (born György Ferenc Buzinkay in Budapest in 1989) is a Hungarian politician, politologist and economist. He was a chairman for Momentum Movement. He was the candidate of United for Hungary at the 2022 Hungarian parliamentary election.

== Family ==
His father is Géza Buzinkay, a historian while his mother is Krisztina Rozsnyai, the official in charge of Magyar Felsőoktatási Akkreditációs Bizottság (Hungarian higher education accreditation commission). He is a member of the historic Buzinkay family. He lives in Szentendre.

== Education ==
He graduated from Eötvös Loránd University with bachelors in political science then he went to Corvinus University of Budapest where he received his masters in public management and public policy.

== Politics ==
He is a founder of the Momentum Movement and was its chairman from 2018.

His party started him in the 2021 Hungarian opposition primary in Pest County 3rd parliamentary individual constituency which he won. In the 2022 elections he lost to Eszter Vitályos, the candidate of Fidesz.

In December 2022 he left Momentum and is now part of the Democratic Coalition party.
