= Pilisszántó =

Pilisszántó Santov
- Village
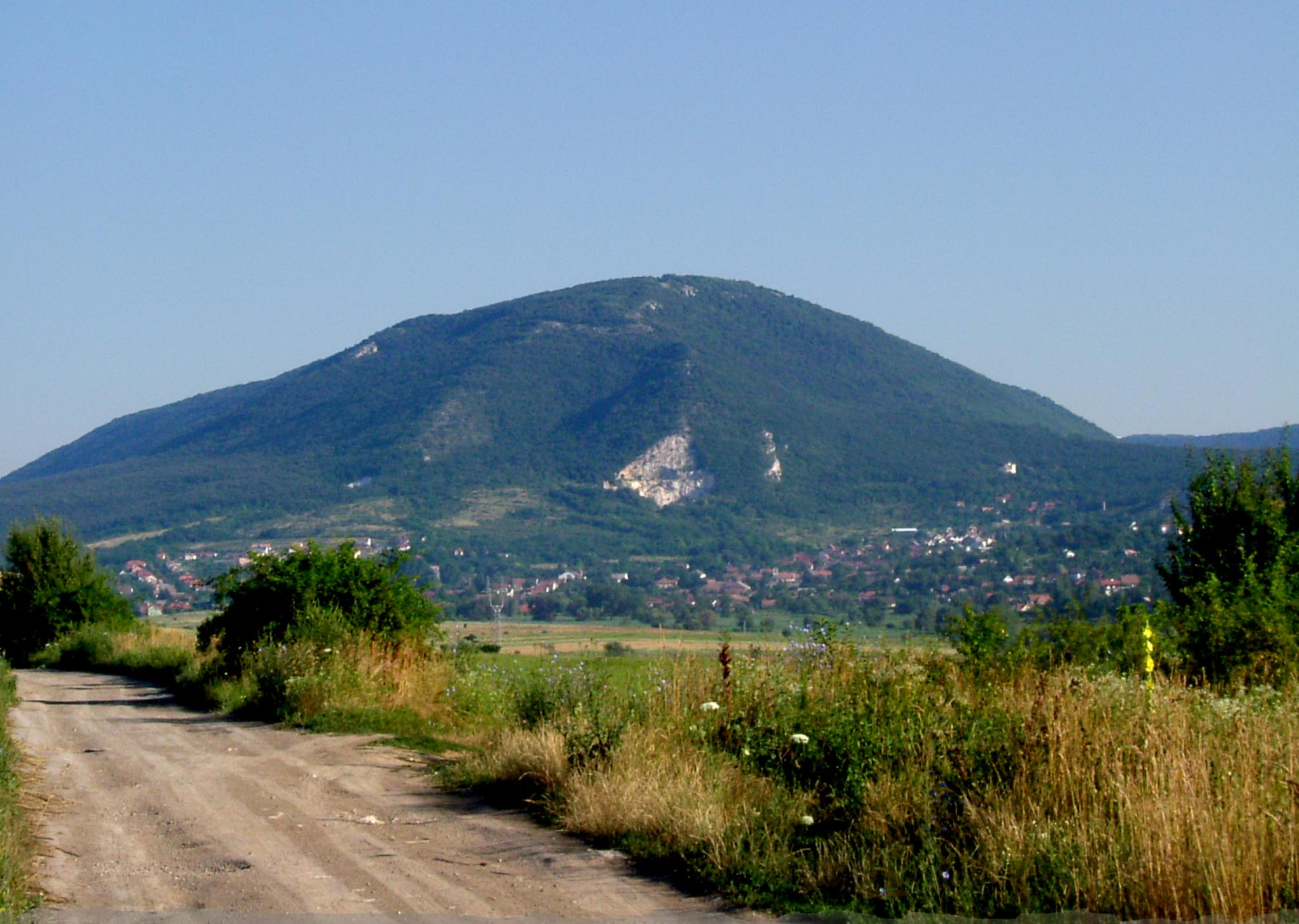

- Flag Coat of arms

- Location of Pilisszántó
- Coordinates: 47.66979°N 18.88674°E
- Country: Hungary
- Region: Central Hungary
- County: Pest
- District: Pilisvörösvár

Area
  - Total: 15.96 km^{2} (6.16 sq mi)

Population (1 January 2025)
  - Total: 2,686
  - Density: 168.3/km^{2} (435.9/sq mi)
- Time zone: UTC+1 (CET)
  - Summer (DST): UTC+2 (CEST)
- Postal code: 2095
- Area code: (+36) 26
- Website: www.pilisszanto.hu

Pilisszántó (Slovak: Santov) is a village in Pest County, Budapest metropolitan area, Hungary. It has a population of 2,365 (2007).
