= Pilisvörösvár =

Pilisvörösvár Werischwar
- Town
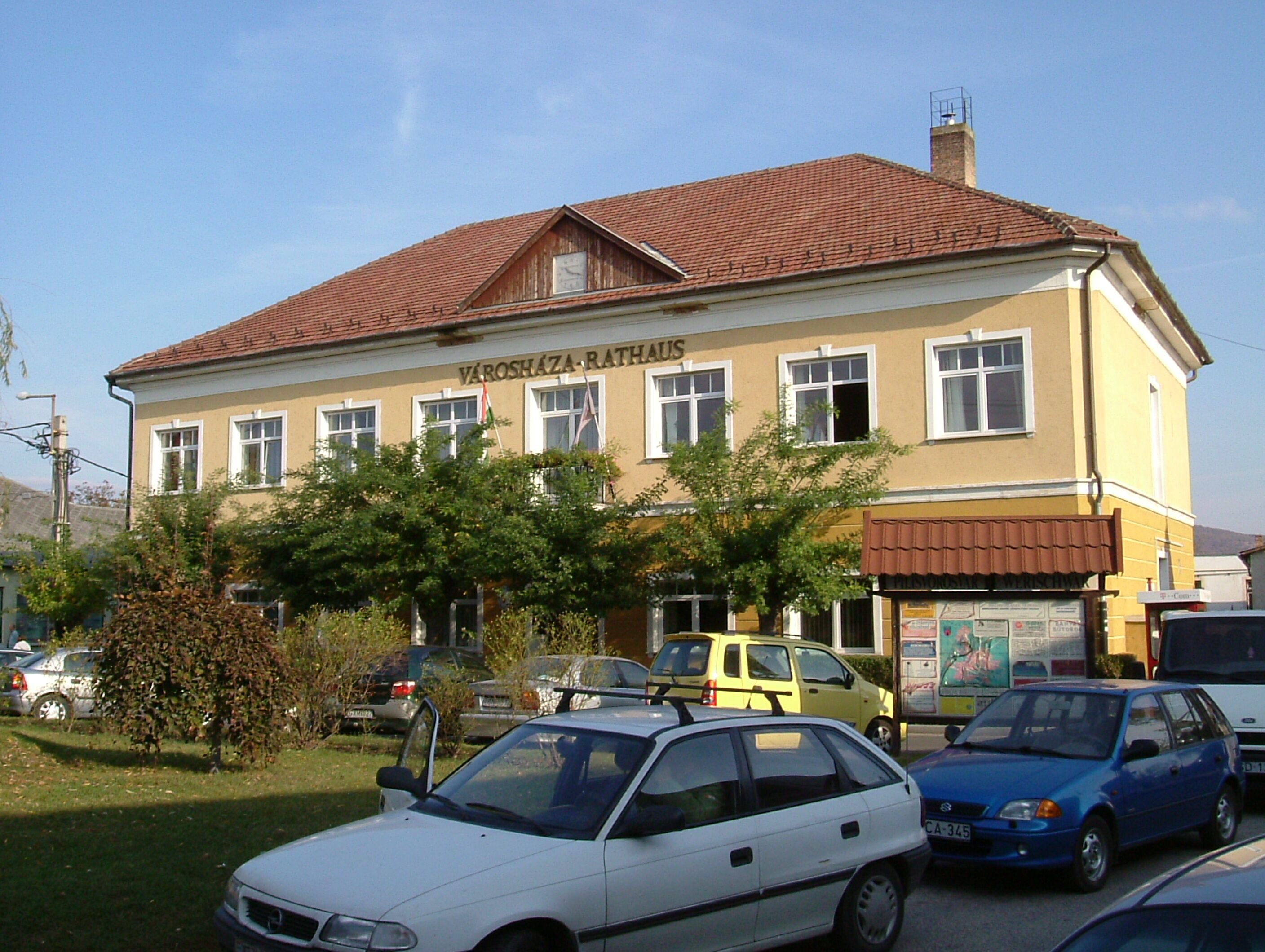
- The town hall

- Flag Coat of arms

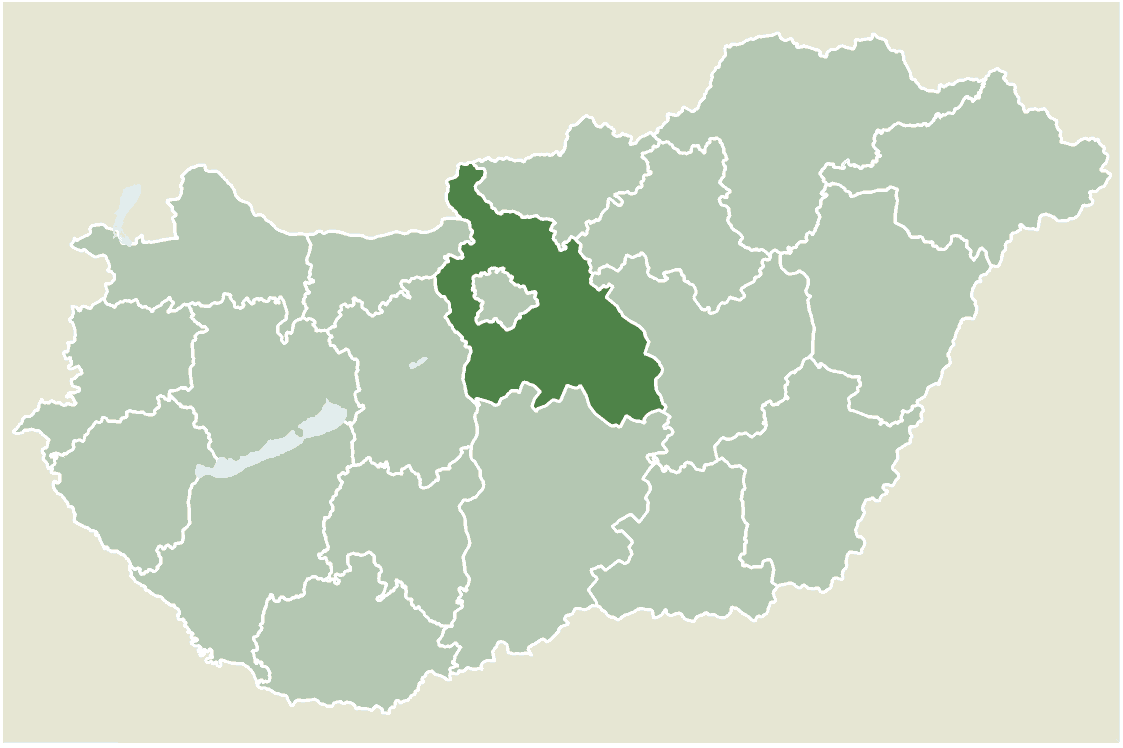
- Location of Pest county in Hungary

- Location of Pilisvörösvár
- Coordinates: 47.621111°N 18.910833°E
- Country: Hungary
- County: Pest
- District: Pilisvörösvár

Area
  - Total: 24.3 km^{2} (9.4 sq mi)

Population (2018)
  - Total: 14,274
  - Density: 587/km^{2} (1,520/sq mi)
- Time zone: UTC+1 (CET)
  - Summer (DST): UTC+2 (CEST)
- Postal code: 2085
- Area code: (+36) 26
- Website: pilisvorosvar.hu

Pilisvörösvár (German: Werischwar or Rotenburg) is a town in Pest County, Hungary.

== Notable people ==
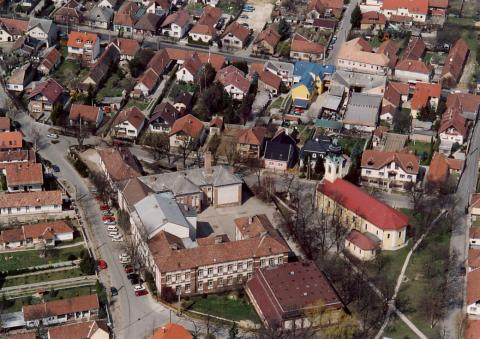
Aerial view

- Károly Erős, football player
- Laszlo Toth, Hungarian-Australian geologist & vandal
- Solomon Breuer, German rabbi

== Twin towns – sister cities ==
Pilisvörösvár is twinned with:

- Borsec, Romania
- Gerstetten, Germany
- Gröbenzell, Germany
