= Pilisborosjenő =

Pilisborosjenő _{Weindorf}
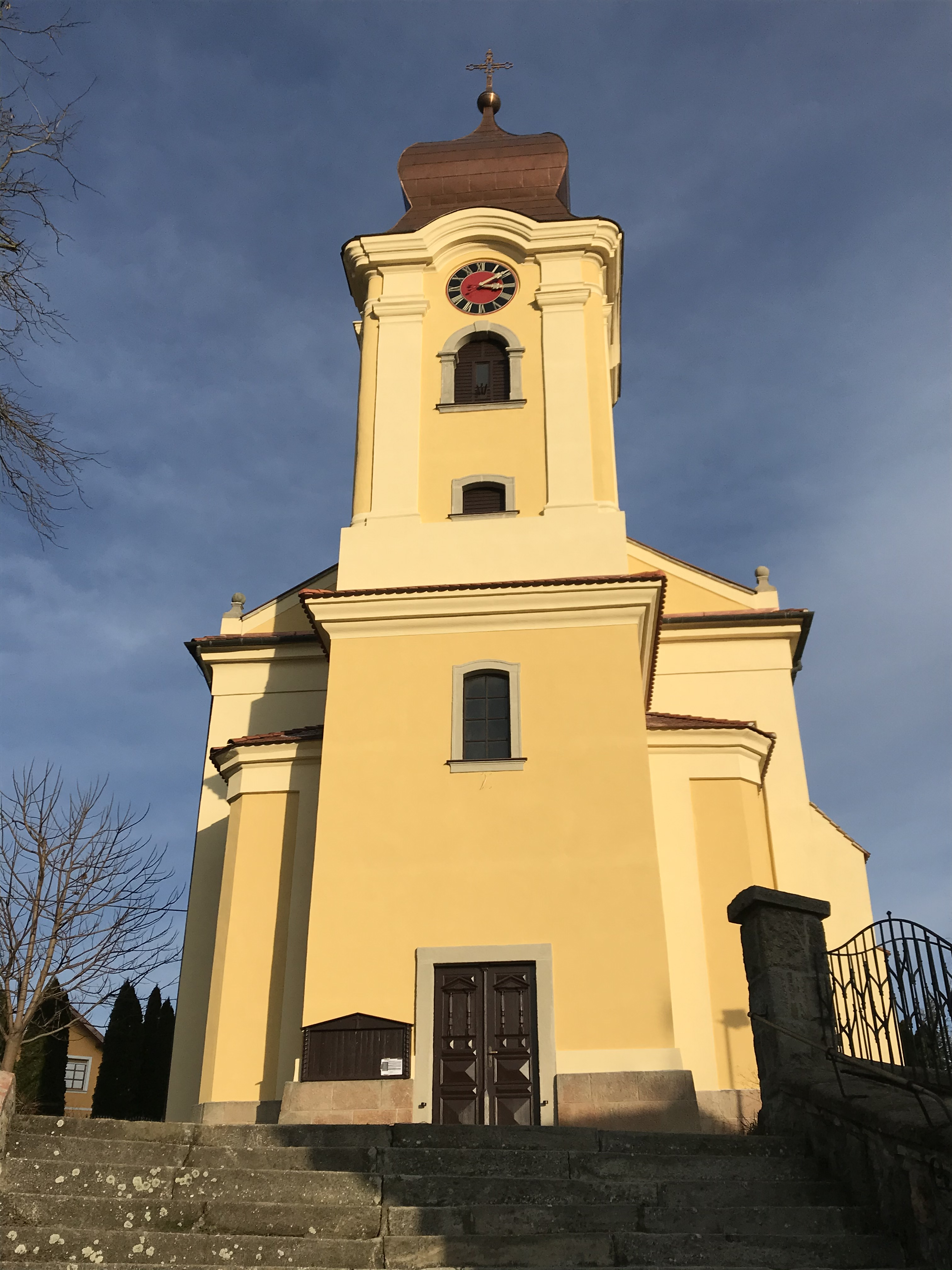

- Flag Coat of arms

- Location of Pilisborosjenő _{Weindorf} in Hungary
- Coordinates: 47°36′21.64″N 18°59′31.02″E
- Country: Hungary
- Region: Central Hungary
- County: Pest
- Subregion: Pilisvörösvári
- Rank: Village

Government
  - Mayor: Balázs Tömöri

Area
  - Total: 9.27 km^{2} (3.58 sq mi)

Population (2012-01-01)
  - Total: 3,373
  - Density: 364/km^{2} (942/sq mi)
- Time zone: UTC+1 (CET)
  - Summer (DST): UTC+2 (CEST)
- Postal code: 2097
- Area code: +36 26
- Website: www.pilisborosjeno.hu

Pilisborosjenő (German: Weindorf) is a village in Pest county, Budapest metropolitan area, Hungary. It has a population of 3,373 (2012).

== History ==
The so-called Mackó cave, located near the northwest border of Pilisborosjenő, provided shelter to people all the way back in the Ice Age. Other than artifacts from the Ancient Period, they have found relics from the Bronze Age and Roman times, as well as ones dating back to the Árpád era. When Romans settled here there was a road leading to Aquincum at the base of Mount Nagy-Kevely, which is located at the northern border of Pilisborosjenő.

During the migration period, Avars came to this region and lived in the area for almost 300 years. Like the people who lived here before them, they also moved along the Danube crossings and the roads to the west of these passages. This is how they reached the area of modern-day Pilisborosjenő: archaeologists found an Avar cemetery where a brick factory is now located. During the conquest of the Carpathian Basin, Borosjenő was taken over by members of the Jenő tribe, and then, the village became the private property of various families. Its earliest documented reference dates back to 1284, when it was listed as Burusjenew. Viticulture (the cultivation of grapes and winemaking) was already known by the locals. The village became the property of the Paulines in 1351 and then of the Dominican nuns in 1357. In the 1490s, it was part of the fortress of Solymár.

It was completely depopulated during Turkish rule. After the Turks were overrun, the Germans populated Borosjenő. The settlement belonged to the treasury, then to the Poor Clare nuns of Buda. In the first half of the 17th century, it was one of several noble estates located in Pest County, owned by Bornemissza Pál Bolgár of Buda; the settlement was then taken over by Barnabás Muslay, a vitéz (Hungarian knight) from Komárom. In the census of 1695, the settlement was already mentioned as Weindorf. In 1800, Palatine József bought Borosjenő, as he did Üröm and Piliscsaba. The village received the name Pilisborosjenő in the second half of the 19th century.

In addition to winemaking, dairy farming was an important source of income for the inhabitants of the village. In addition to their diligent and persistent work ethic, the settled German inhabitants were also very religious. Thus, many people from the area visited the pilgrimage site in Pilisborosjenő. After World War II, 90% of the population was replaced by Hungarian families from the Highlands (Slovakia) and Transylvania (Romania) in the framework of the Czechoslovak-Hungarian population exchange. Today, this village with German roots is part of the Budapest agglomeration, so at the end of the 19th century when many left Budapest, its population did not decrease but rather slowly increased. Pilisborosjenő is currently part of the Danube-Ipoly National Park.
