= Pilisszentiván =

Village in Pest County, Hungary

Pilisszentiván _{Sankt-Iwan}
- Flag Coat of arms

- Location of Pilisszentiván _{Sankt-Iwan} in Hungary
- Coordinates: 47.61093°N 18.89382°E
- Country: Hungary
- Region: Central Hungary
- County: Pest
- Subregion: Pilisvörösvári
- Rank: Village

Government
  - Mayor: Pénzes Gábor

Area
  - Total: 8.12 km^{2} (3.14 sq mi)

Population (1 January 2008)
  - Total: 4,278
  - Density: 527/km^{2} (1,360/sq mi)
- Time zone: UTC+1 (CET)
  - Summer (DST): UTC+2 (CEST)
- Postal code: 2084
- Area code: +36 26
- KSH code: 11396
- Website: www.pilisszentivan.hu

Pilisszentiván (German: Sankt-Iwan) is a village in Pest county, Budapest metropolitan area, Hungary. It has a population of 4,217 (2007).

== Economy ==
The local company - Gentherm Hungary Kft. - of the Gentherm Inc. is located in the village.
