= M49 expressway (Hungary) =

Road in Hungary

M49 expressway
- M49-es autóút
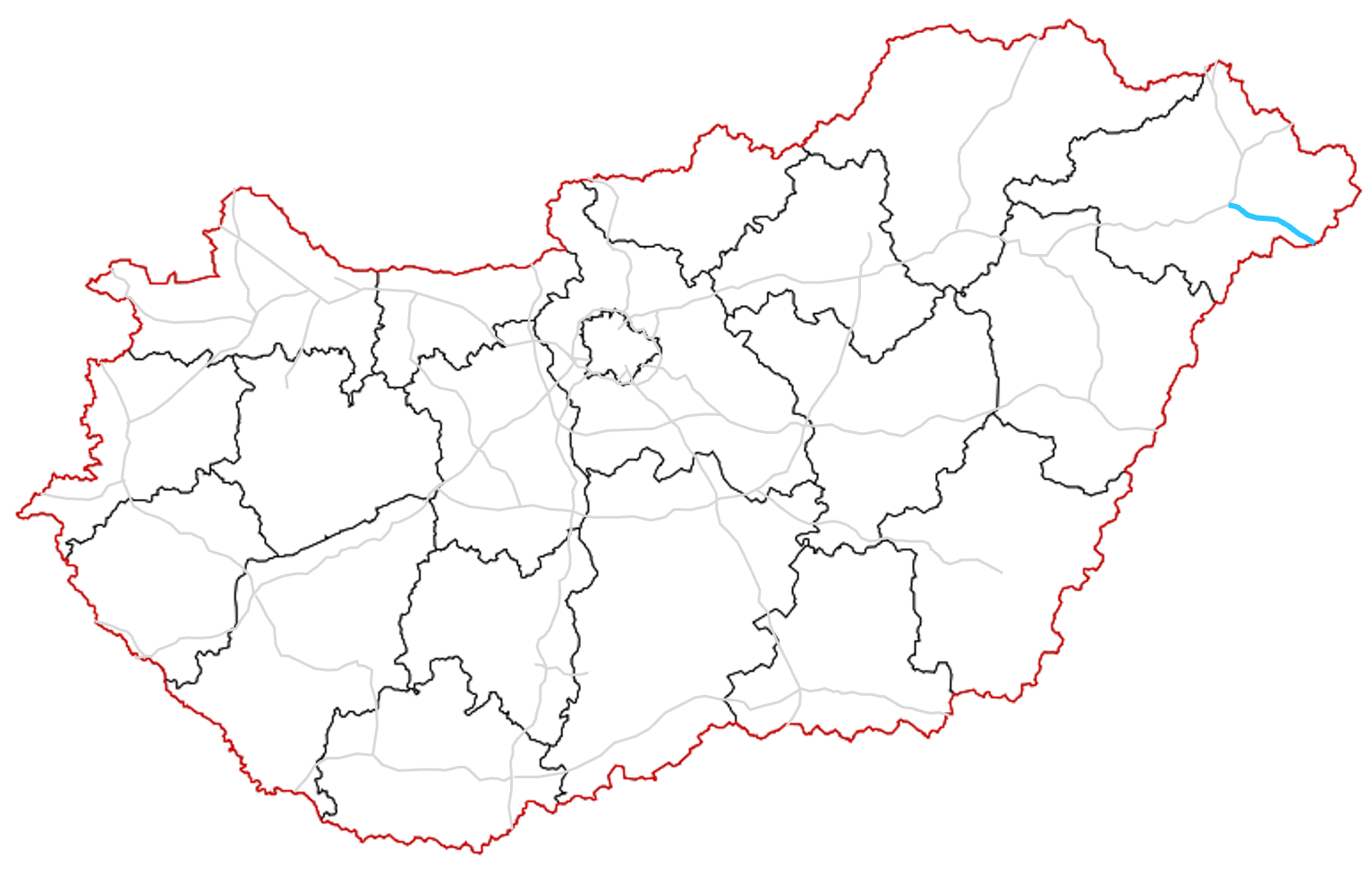

Route information
- Length: 45 km (28 mi) (planned length)

Major junctions
- From: M3 near Vaja
- 49 near Őr
- To: A 14 border with Romania (planned)

Location
- Country: Hungary
- Counties: Szabolcs-Szatmár-Bereg

Highway system
- Roads in Hungary; Highways; Main roads; Local roads

The M49 expressway (Hungarian: M49-es autóút) is an expressway, which will have a length of 45km upon completion. It will link the M3 motorway to the border with Romania near Csenger, where it will connect with Romania's A14 motorway towards Satu Mare. Upon completion, it will serve as a continuation of the Romanian high-speed road to Budapest, the capital of Hungary.

== Timeline ==
Section	Length	Opened	Notes
Vaja (M3) – Ököritófülpös	28.2 km (17.52 mi)	Opened in 2026, on October 27	Open
Ököritófülpös – Csenger (border)	17.5 km (10.87 mi)	Expected by 2029, together with A14	Under construction

== Route description ==
- The route will be full length expressway. The maximum speed limit is 110 km/h, with (2x2 lane road).

County	km	Type	Destination	Notes
Szabolcs-Szatmár-Bereg	0	Interchange	M3 / E579 – Budapest, Nyíregyháza; M3 / E579 – Vásárosnamény	The western terminus of the expressway. Kilometrage starting point modified trumpet interchange Western under construction section
Szabolcs-Szatmár-Bereg	1	Exit	Main road 49 – Jármi / Őr	
Szabolcs-Szatmár-Bereg	7	Exit	Main road 471 – Mátészalka nyugat / Nyírmeggyes, Nyírbátor	
Szabolcs-Szatmár-Bereg	14	Rest area	Mátészalkai pihenőhely	pihenőhely means Rest area
Szabolcs-Szatmár-Bereg	13	Bridge	Kraszna híd	híd means Bridge
Szabolcs-Szatmár-Bereg	14	Exit	Main road 491 – Kocsord / Győrtelek, Tunyogmatolcs	
Szabolcs-Szatmár-Bereg	28	Exit	Main road 49 – Ököritófülpös	Eastern under construction section
Szabolcs-Szatmár-Bereg	31	Exit	Porcsalma, Tyukod	Planned
Szabolcs-Szatmár-Bereg	41	Exit	Csenger / Csengerújfalu	
Szabolcs-Szatmár-Bereg	45	Border control	Csenger (H) – Vetiș-Oar II. (RO) border crossing A 14 – Satu Mare towards to Baia Mare	Planned
1.000 mi = 1.609 km; 1.000 km = 0.621 mi: Concurrency terminus; Incomplete access; Unopened

== See also ==
- Roads in Hungary
- Transport in Hungary
