= Roads in Hungary =

Public roads of Hungary

Border road sign with general speed-limits in Hungary.

Public roads in Hungary are ranked according to importance and traffic as follows:

- controlled-access highway (gyorsforgalmi út – pl. gyorsforgalmi utak) – colour: blue; designation: M followed by one or two digits. It has two categories: motorways and expressways.
  - motorways (autópálya – pl. autópályák): 2+2 travel lanes and emergency lane, central reservation, no at-grade intersections
  - expressway (autóút – pl. autóutak): mostly 2+2 travel lanes without emergency line, central reservation, some at-grade intersections
- main roads (főút – pl. főutak) – colour: green; designation: one, two or three digits
  - primary main roads (elsődrendű főút – pl. elsőrendű főutak): national importance roads
  - secondary main roads (másodrendű főút – pl. másodrendű főutak): regional importance roads
- side roads (mellékút - pl. mellékutak) – colour: green; designation: with four or five digits
- municipal roads (önkormányzati út- pl. önkormányzati utak)

Some of the national roads are part of the European route scheme.
European routes passing through Hungary: E60; E65; E66; E68; E71; E73; E75; E77; E79 (Class A); E573; E653; E661 (Class B).

== Highways ==
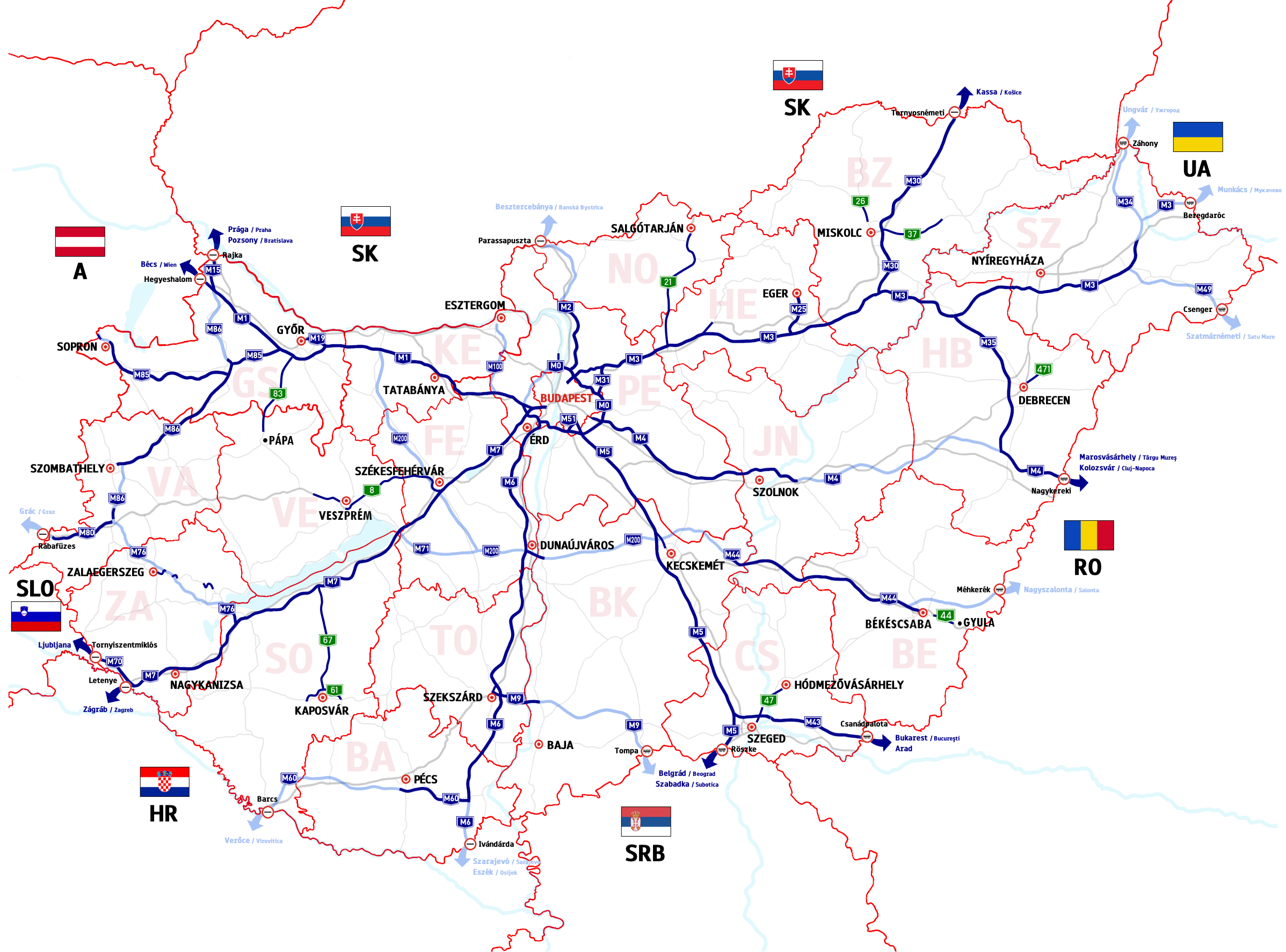
Highways in Hungary in December 2023. in service under construction or proposed

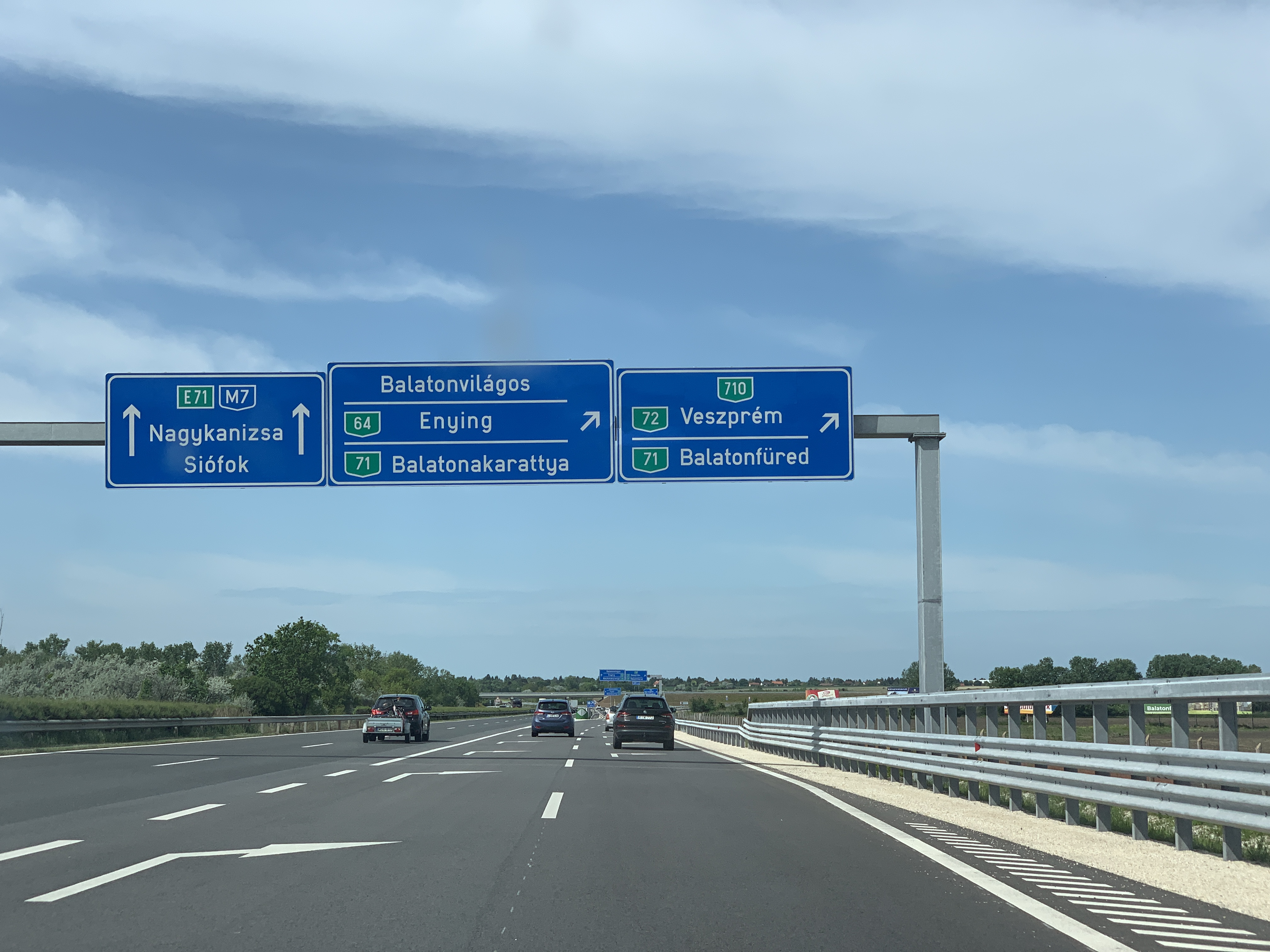
M7 motorway near Balatonfőkajár junction.

They have one lane in each direction, signs are white-on-blue and the normal speed limit is 130 km/h, in expressways 110 km/h. According to the Állami Autópályakezelő Zrt. ("State Motorway Management Plc."), the total length of the Hungarian motorway system was 1,400.6 kilometers in 2013. The construction of the Hungarian motorway system started in 1964 with M7, which finished in 1975 between Budapest and Lake Balaton. The total length of the system reached 200 km in 1980, 500 km in 1998, and 1000 km in 2007.

Road signs are white shield on blue and the abbreviation for both types of highways is M.

The main differences are that motorways feature emergency lanes and the maximum allowed speed limit is 130 km/h (81 mph), while expressways may be built without them and the speed limit is 110 km/h (68 mph).

- Motorways are public roads with controlled access which are designated for motor vehicles only, and feature two carriageways with at least two continuous lanes each with paved emergency lanes, divided by a median. They have no one-level intersections with any roads or other forms of land and water transport. They are equipped with roadside rest areas, which are intended only for the users of the motorway.
- Expressways share most of the characteristics of motorways, differing mainly in that:
1. Expressways may be built without paved emergency lanes.
2. Expressways are designated for lower speed than motorways. For example, the road curvature can be higher and the lanes are usually narrower (3.5 m vs 3.75 m).
3. Expressways can have a single carriageway on sections with low traffic density.

Development of the overall length (at the end of):

Total length of highways in use in Hungary
Year	1965	1970	1975	1980	1985	1990	1995	2000	2005	2010	2015	2020	2025
Length [km]	7	85	132	213	302	347	384	531	777	1,241	1,399	1,745	1,938

=== List of highways ===
- Highways in service:

Motorways:

M1 | M3 | M4 | M5 | M6 | M7 | M8 | M15 | M30 | M31 | M35 | M43 | M60 | M70

Expressways:

M0 | M2 | M4 | M9 | M19 | M25 | M44 | M49 | M51 | M76 | M85 | M86

- Proposed Highways:

M10 | M32 | M34 | M71 | M87 | M100 | M200

== Main roads ==
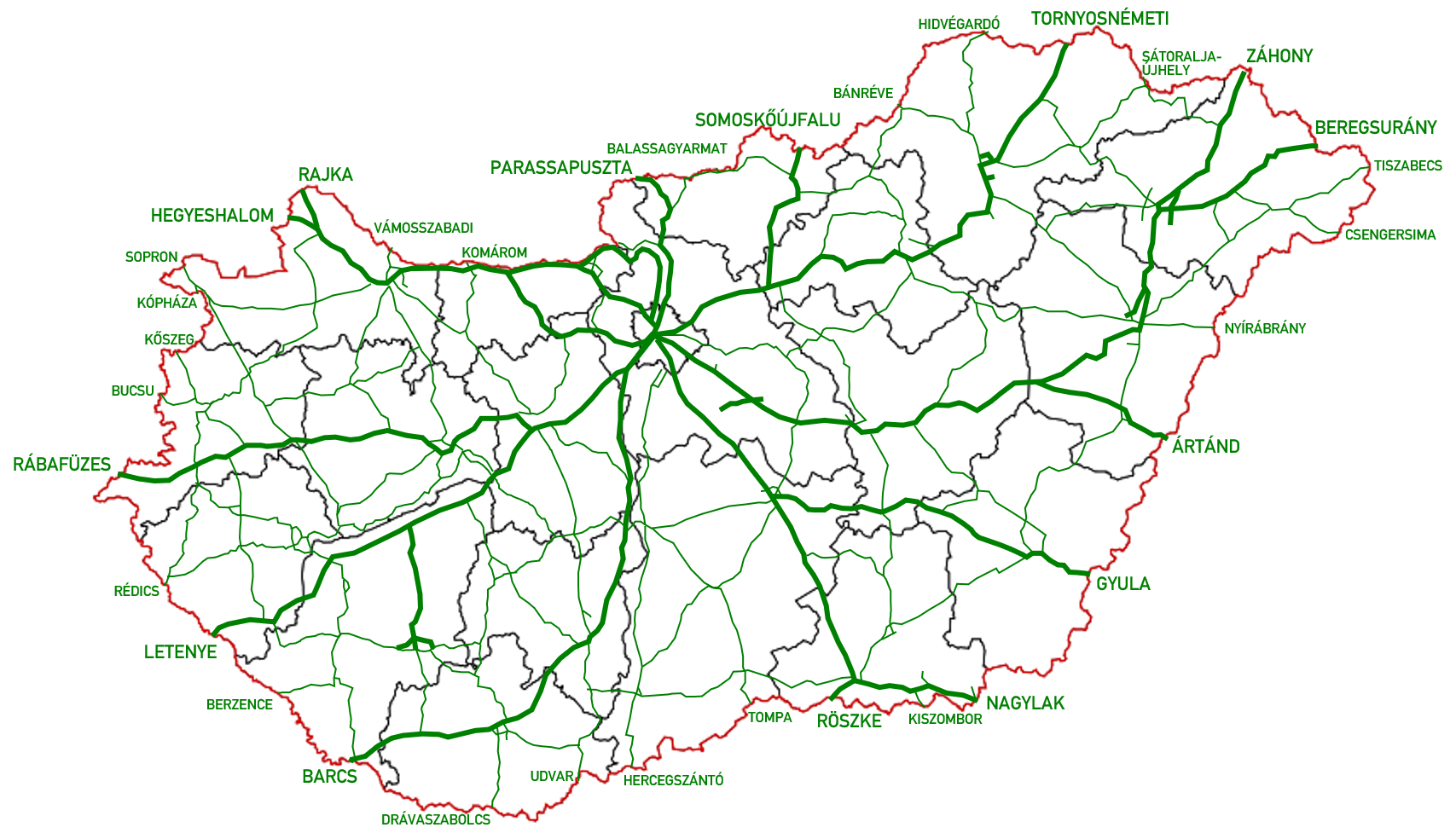
Main roads in Hungary.

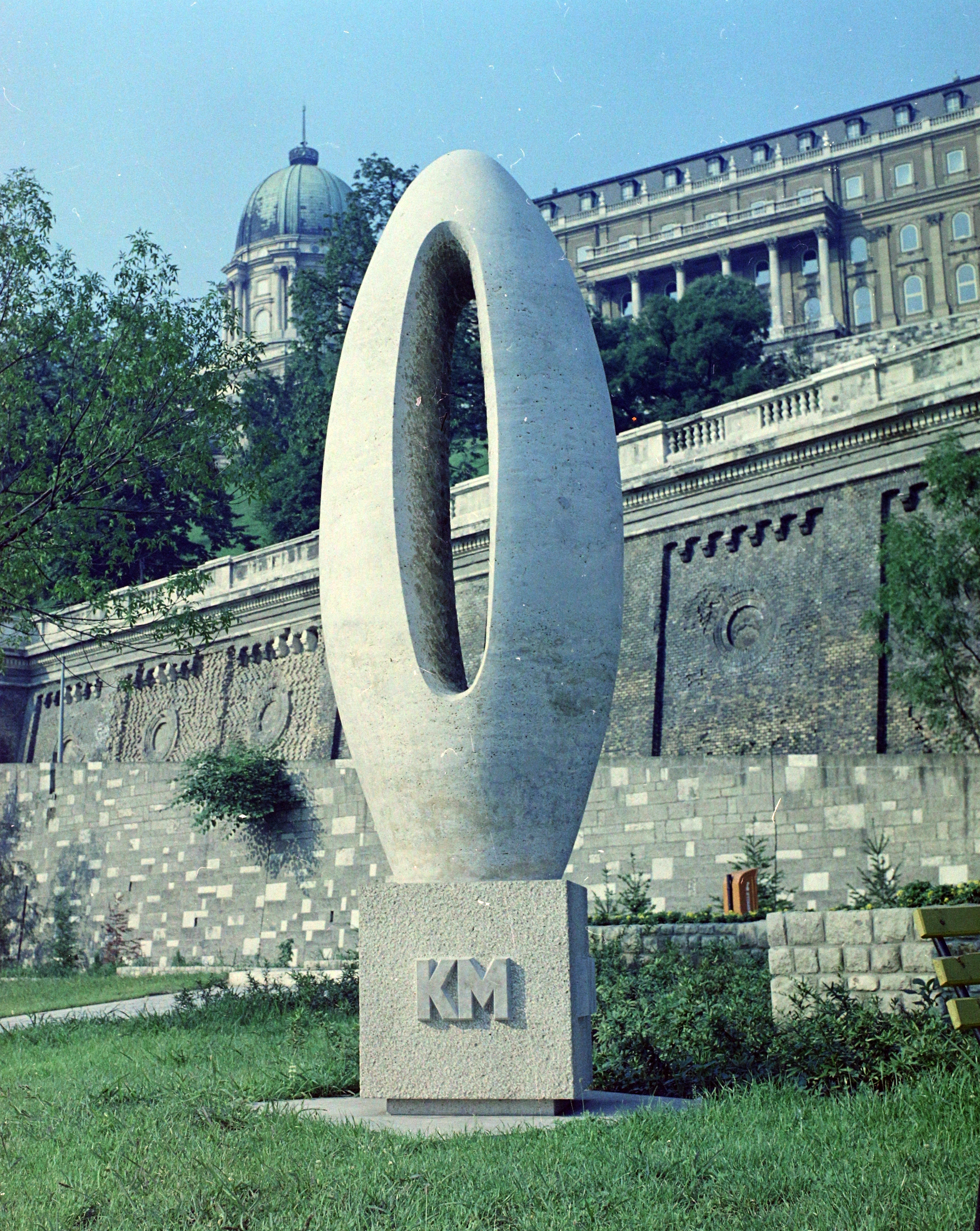
it symbolizes the starting point of the kilometer numbering of the main roads starting from the capital city.

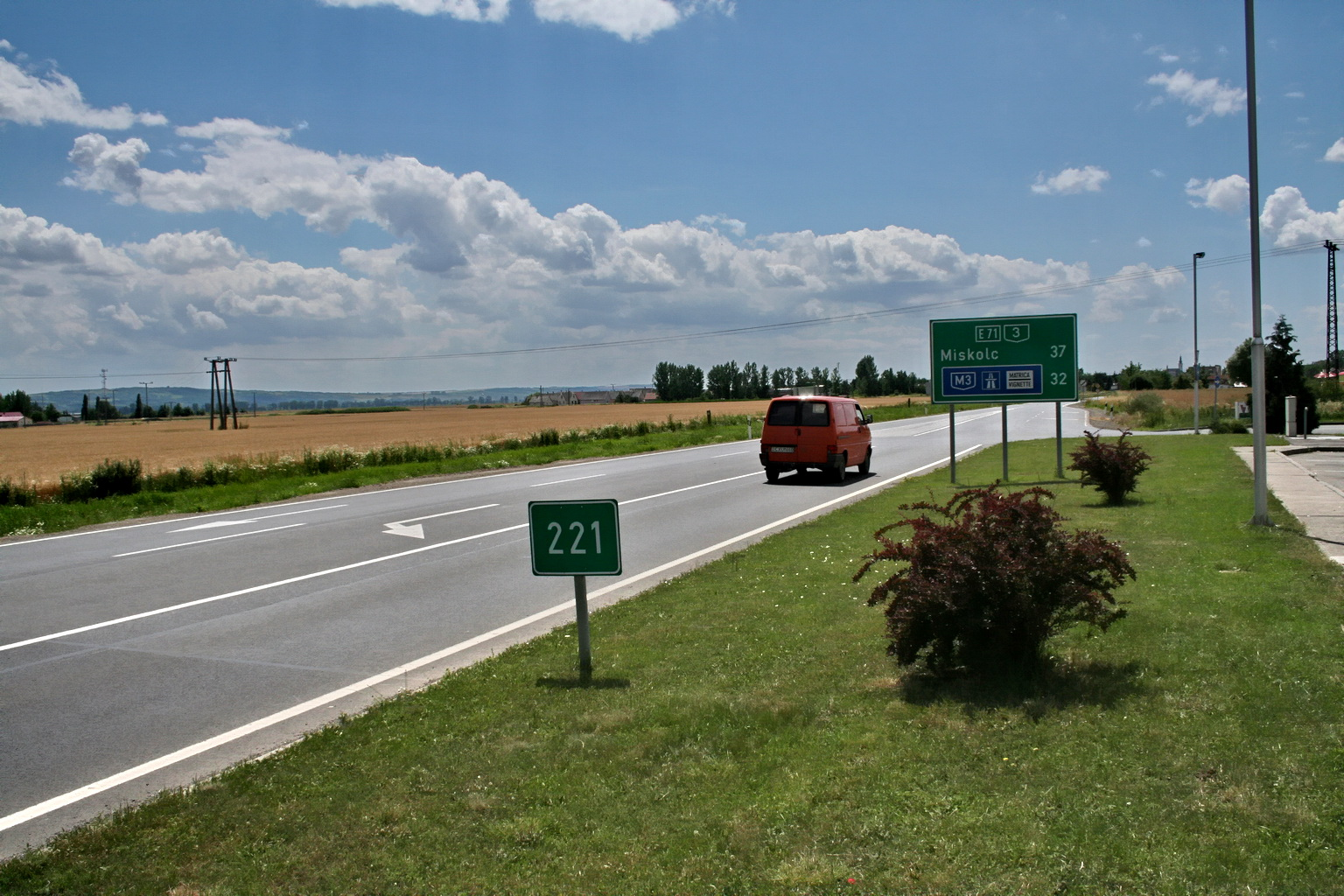
Main road 3 near Encs.

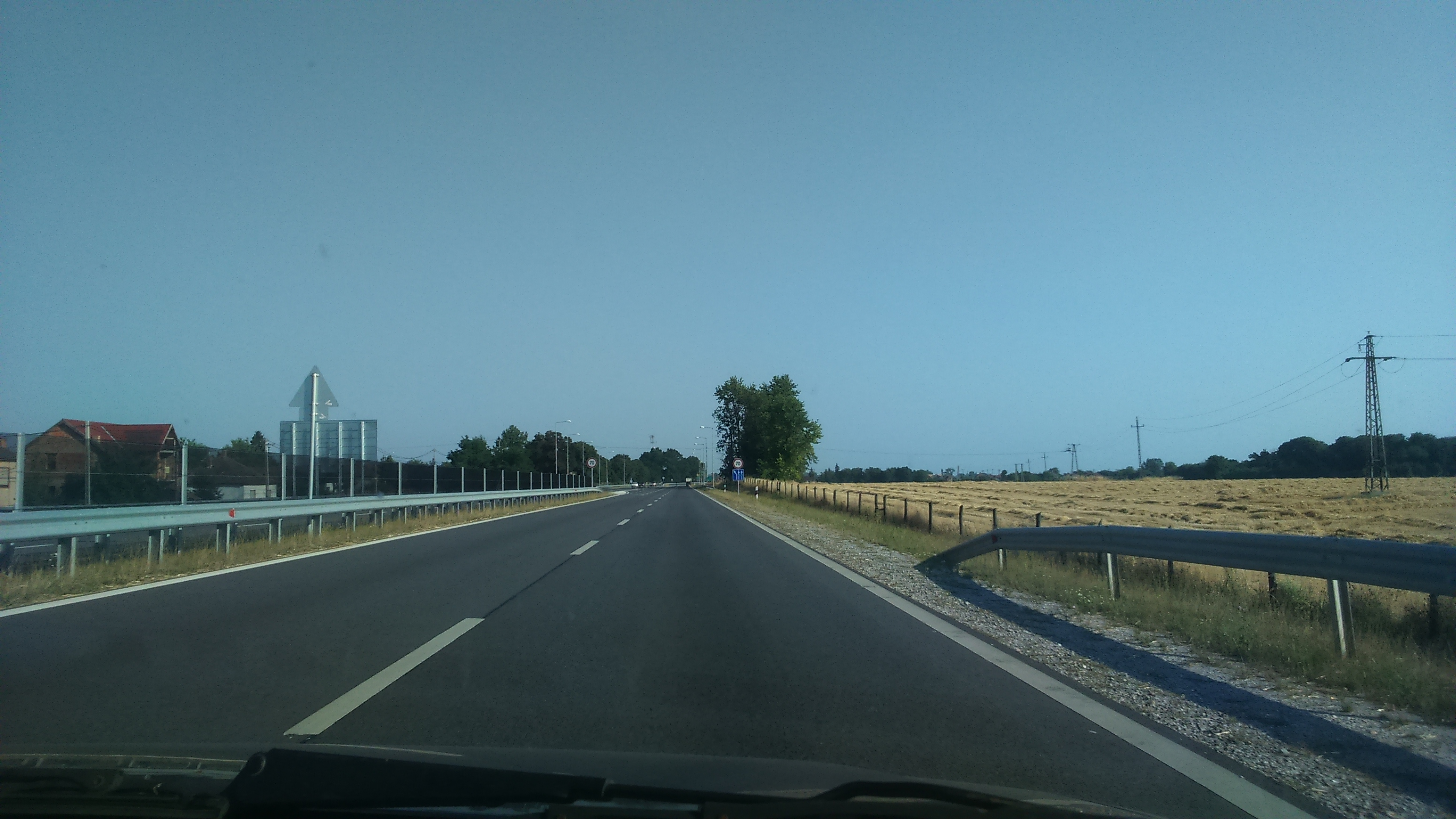
Main road 21 near Zagyvaszántó.

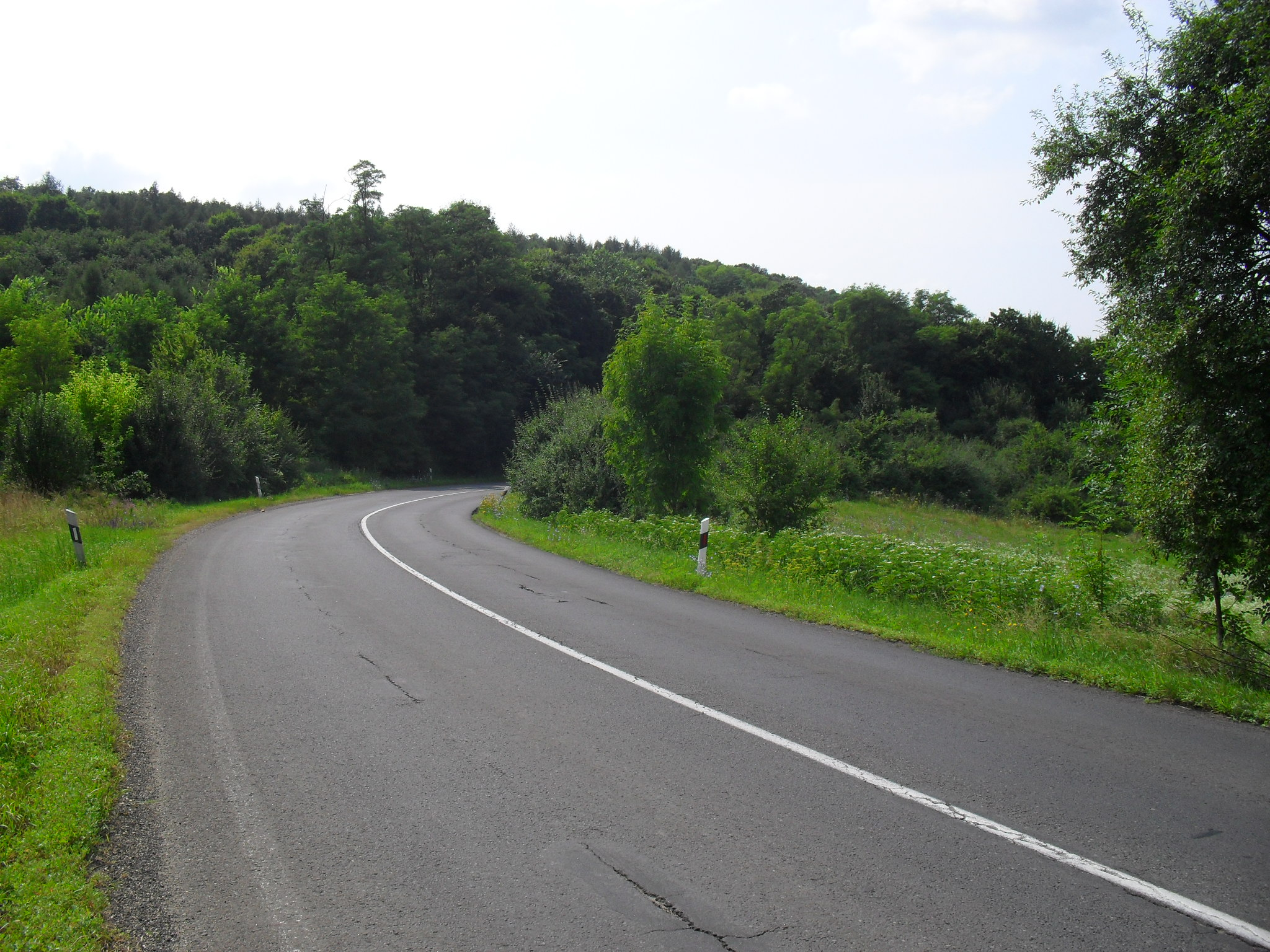
Main road 22 near Őrhalom.

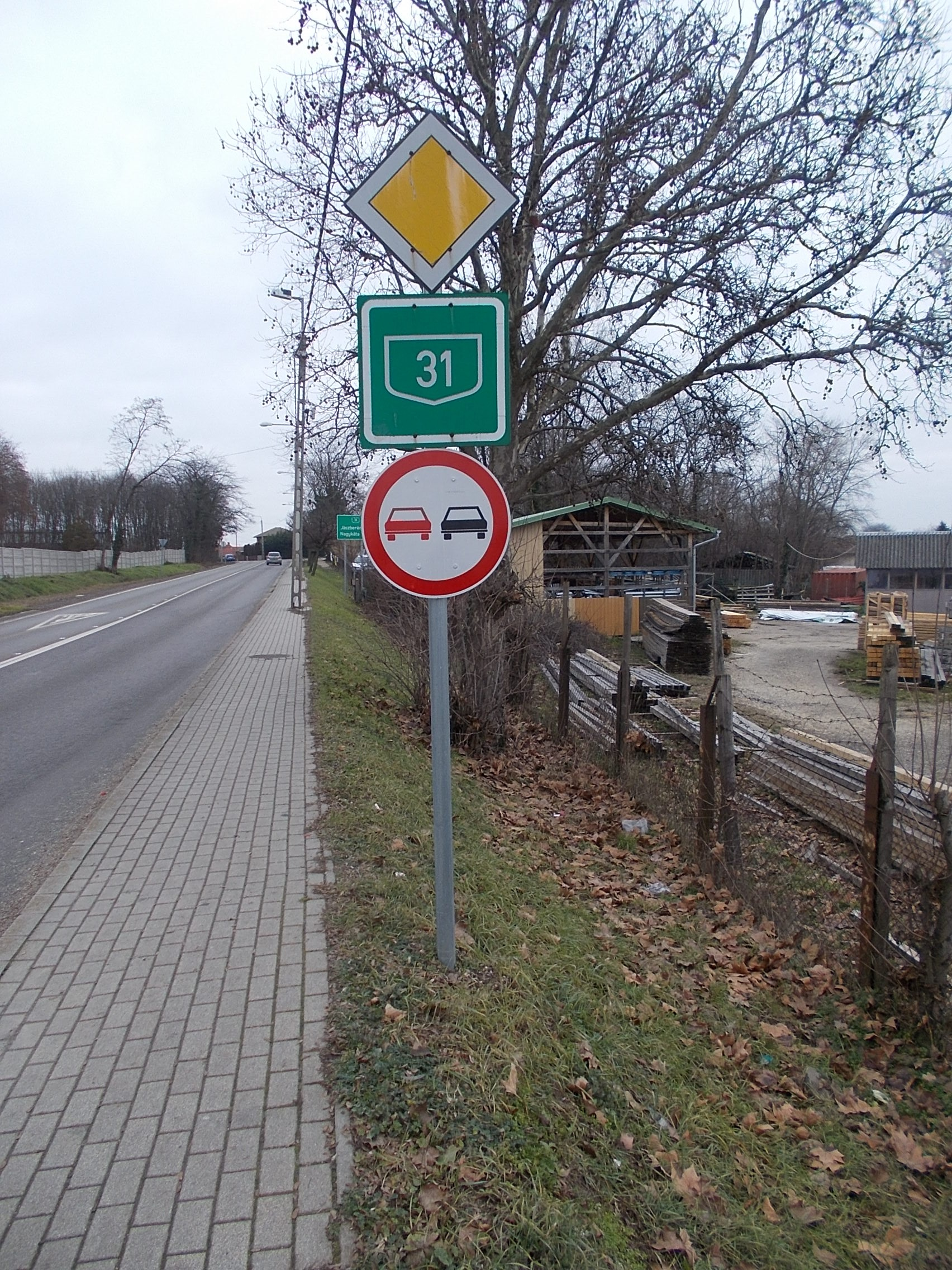
Main road 31 near Maglód.

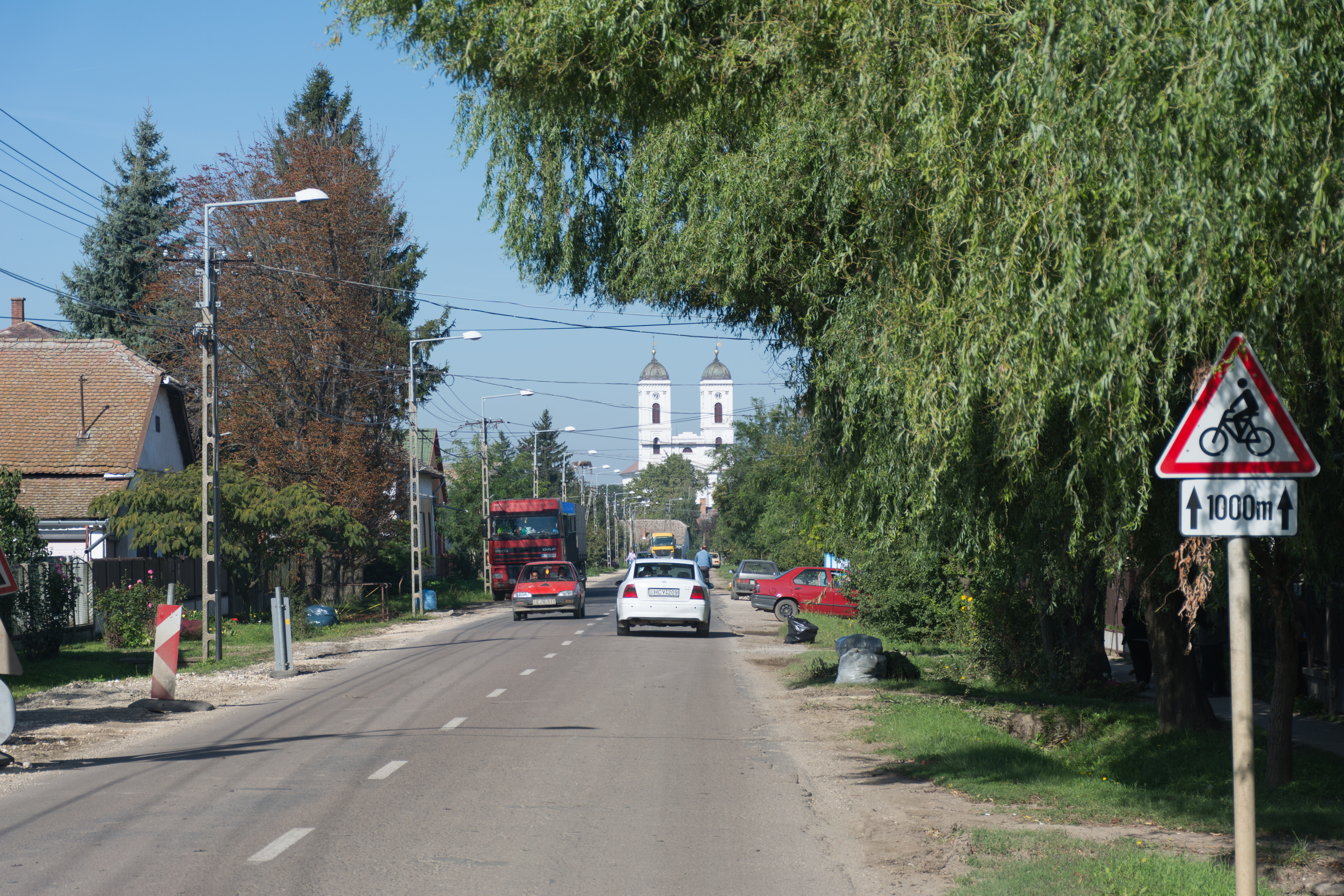
Main road 34 in Kunhegyes.

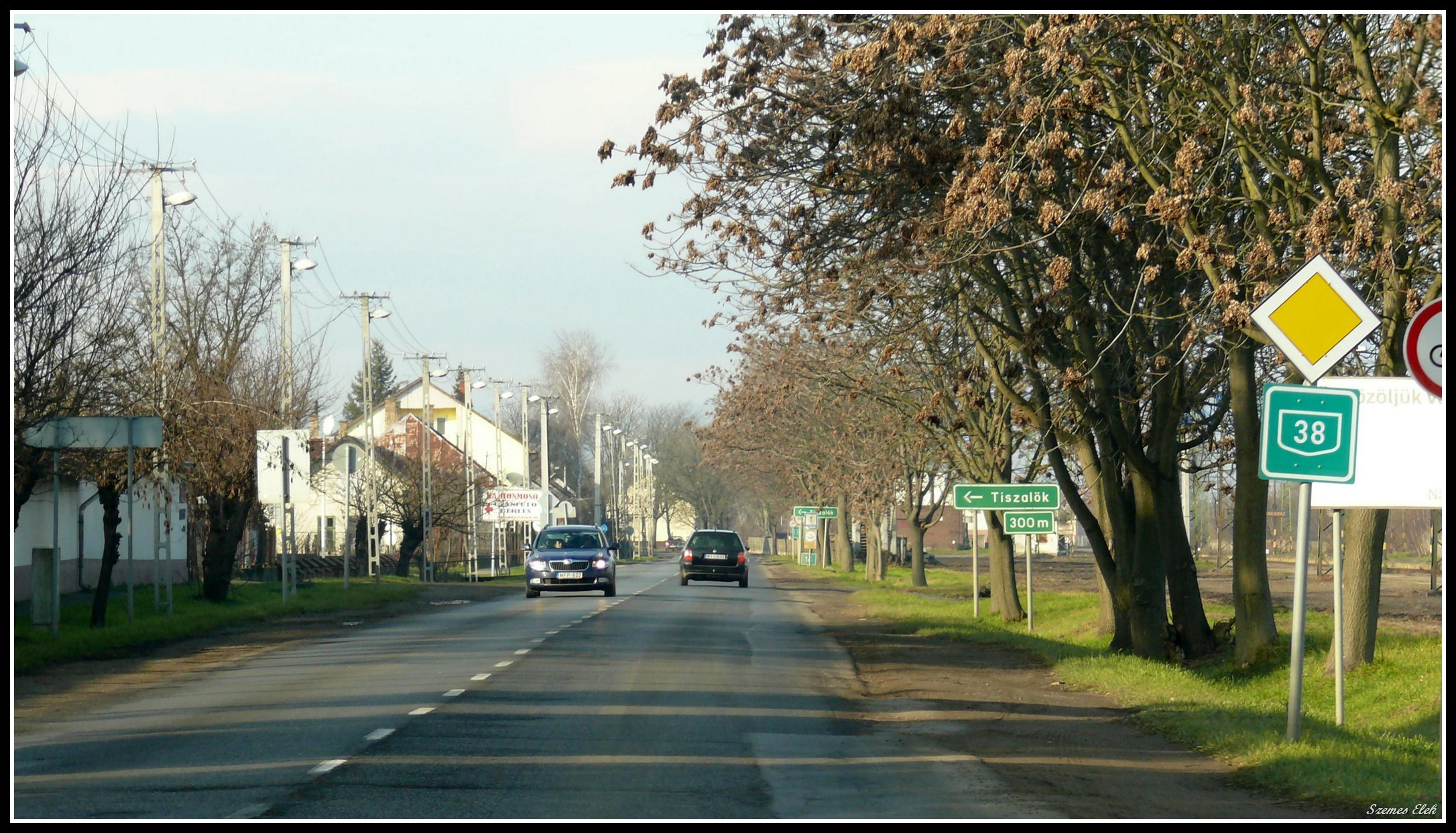
Main road 38 in Rakamaz.

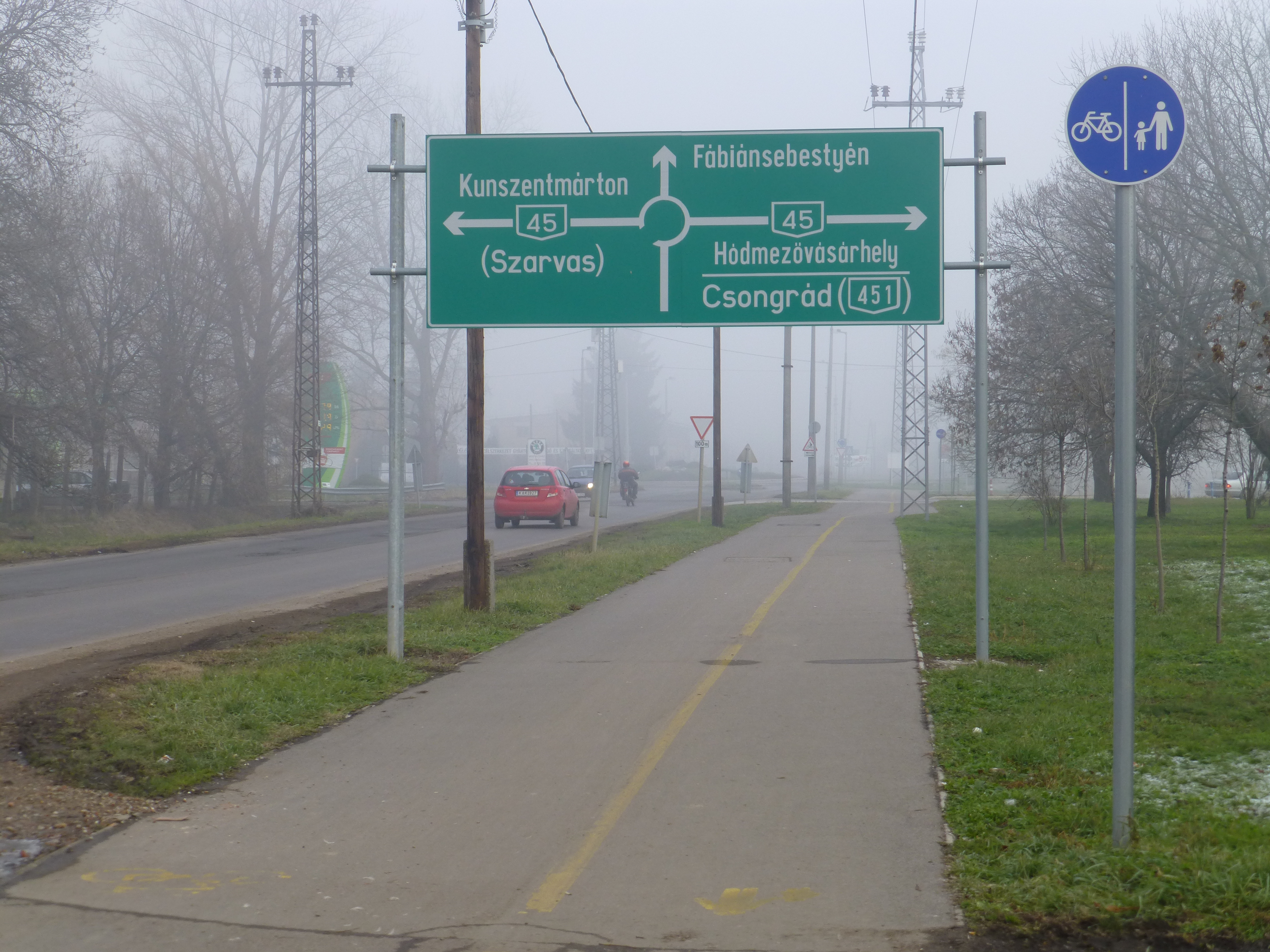
Signs of the main road 45 in Szentes.

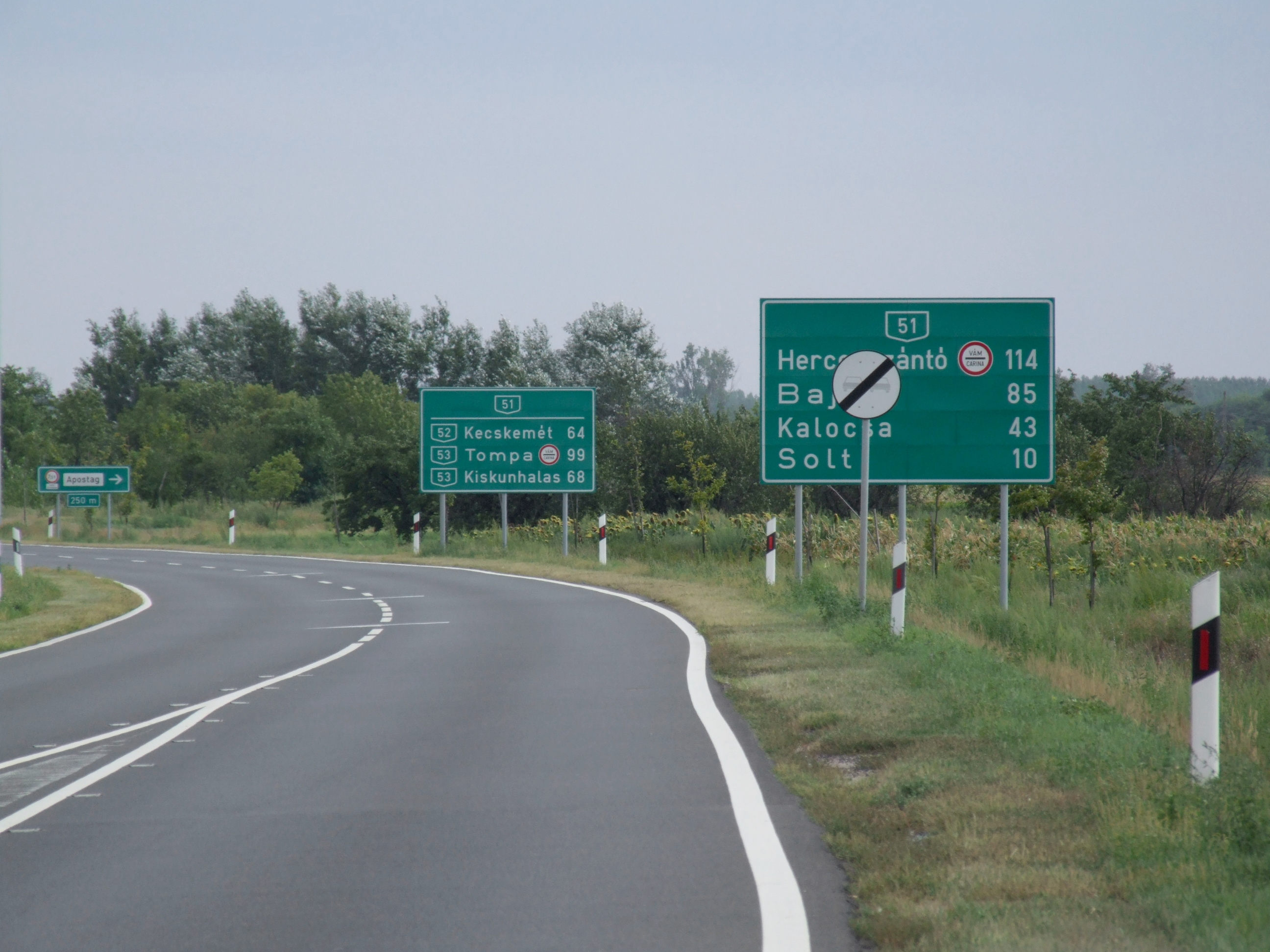
Signs of the main road 51 near Apsotag.

They have one lane in each direction, signs are white-on-green and the normal speed limit is 90 km/h.

=== Primary main roads ===
Roads categorized as state roads, primary main roads are 2,169 km in total length as of December 2022. The routes are marked with one, two, or three-digit numbers.

Designation	Route	Length
1	Budapest - Budaörs - Bicske - Tatabánya - Tata - Komárom - Győr - Mosonmagyaróvár - Hegyeshalom / Border with Austria	177 km
2	Budapest - Dunakeszi - Vác - Rétság - Parassapuszta (Hont) / Border with Slovakia	78 km
3	Budapest - Gödöllő - Aszód - Hatvan - Gyöngyös - Füzesabony - Mezőkövesd - Emőd - Nyékládháza - Miskolc - Szikszó - Encs - Tornyosnémeti / Border with Slovakia	247 km
4	Budapest - Monor - Cegléd - Szolnok - Törökszentmiklós - Kisújszállás - Karcag - Püspökladány - Hajdúszoboszló - Debrecen - Téglás - Hajdúhadház - Újfehértó - Nyíregyháza - Kisvárda - Záhony / Border with Ukraine	352 km
5	Budapest - Dabas - Lajosmizse - Kecskemét - Kiskunfélegyháza - Szeged - Röszke / Border with Serbia	185 km
6	Budapest - Érd - Százhalombatta - Dunaújváros - Dunaföldvár - Paks - Tolna - Bonyhád - Pécsvárad - Pécs - Szentlőrinc - Barcs / Border with Croatia	262 km
7	Budapest - Érd - Kápolnásnyék - Székesfehérvár - Siófok - Balatonföldvár - Balatonlelle - Balatonboglár - Fonyód - Zalakomár - Galambok - Nagykanizsa - Letenye / Border with Croatia	233 km
8	Székesfehérvár (M7 motorway) - Várpalota - Veszprém - Herend - Városlőd - Devecser - Jánosháza - Vasvár - Körmend - Rábafüzes (Szentgotthárd) / Border with Austria	190 km
10	Óbuda - Dorog - Tát - Nyergesújfalu (Main road 1)	75 km
15	Mosonmagyaróvár (Main road 1) - Rajka / Border with Slovakia	15 km
21	Hatvan (Main road 3) - Pásztó - Bátonyterenye - Salgótarján (Somoskőújfalu) / Border with Slovakia	65 km
41	Nyíregyháza (Main road 4) - Baktalórántháza - Vásárosnamény - Beregsurány / Border with Ukraine	73 km
42	Püspökladány (Main road 4) - Berettyóújfalu - Biharkeresztes - Ártánd / Border with Romania	59 km
43	Szeged (Main road 5) - Makó - Nagylak / Border with Romania	55 km
44	Kecskemét (Main road 5) - Kunszentmárton - Szarvas - Békéscsaba - Gyula / Border with Romania	144 km
354	Northern bypass of Debrecen (M35 motorway - Main road 4)	12 km
403	Eastern bypass of Nyíregyháza (M3 motorway - Main road 4)	14 km
405	Albertirsa (M4 expressway) - Újhartyán (M5 motorway)	15 km
502	Western bypass of Szeged	6 km

=== Secondary main road ===
Roads categorized as state roads, class IIb are 4,849 km in total length as of December 2022. The routes are marked with two or three-digit numbers.

Designation	Route	Length
101	Hegyeshalom (Main road 1) - M1 motorway	1 km
102	Herceghalom (Main road 1) - Zsámbék - Pilisjászfalu (Main road 10)	23 km
11	Óbuda (Main road 10) - Szentendre - Esztergom - Main road 117	72 km
111	Esztergom (Main road 11) - Dorog (Main road 10)	8 km
117	Bypass of Dorog	16 km
12	Vác (M2 epressway) - Nagymaros - Szob	27 km
13	Border with Slovakia / Bypass of Komárom - Nagyigmánd - Kisbér (Main road 81)	29 km
132	Old Komárom section of Main road 13 (Border with Slovakia / Komárom - Main road 13)	4 km
14	Győr (Main road 81) - Vámosszabadi / Border with Slovakia	13 km
211	Old Salgótarján section of Main road 21	3 km
22	Rétság (Main road 2) - Balassagyarmat - Szécsény - Salgótarján (Main road 21); Old section of Main road 2	67 km
222	Balassagyarmat (Main road 22) / Border with Slovakia	2 km
23	Bátonyterenye (Main road 21) - Pétervására - Tarnalelesz (Main road 25)	33 km
24	Gyöngyös (Main road 3) - Recsk - Sirok - Eger (Main road 25)	60 km
25	Kerecsend (Main road 3) - Eger - Tarnalelesz - Ózd - Bánréve (Main road 26)	82 km
251	Maklár (M25 expressway) - Füzesabony (Main road 3)	4 km
252	Part of the southern bypass of Eger (Main road 25 - M25 expressway)	1 km
253	Mezőkövesd (Main road 3) - Andornaktálya (M25 expressway); Old section of Side road 2502	12 km
26	Miskolc (Main road 3) - Kazincbarcika - Putnok - Bánréve / Border with Slovakia	45 km
260	Bypass of Sajószentpéter and Berente	11 km
27	Sajószentpéter (Main road 26) - Edelény - Szendrő - Tornanádaska / Border with Slovakia	55 km
302	Emőd (Main road 3) - M3 motorway	8 km
304	Southern bypass of Miskolc (Main road 3 - M30 motorway)	4 km
306	Northern bypass of Miskolc (M30 motorway - Main road 26)	6 km
31	Budapest - Gyömrő - Nagykáta - Jászberény - Jászapáti - Heves - Füzesabony (Main road 33)	126 km
311	Nagykáta (Main road 31) - Farmos - Cegléd (Main road 4)	34 km
32	Hatvan (M3 motorway) - Jászberény - Újszász - Szolnok (Main road 4)	80 km
33	Füzesabony (Main road 3) - Tiszafüred - Hortobágy - Debrecen (Main road 4)	111 km
331	Western bypass of Mezőkövesd (Main road 3 - M30 motorway)	6 km
338	Western bypass of Nyíregyháza (M3 motorway - Main road 38)	7 km
34	Tiszafüred (Main road 33) - Kunmadaras - Kunhegyes - Fegyvernek (Main road 4)	55 km
35	Nyékládháza (Main road 3) - Tiszaújváros - Polgár - Hajdúböszörmény - Debrecen (Main road 4)	86 km
351	Introduction road of Tiszaújváros (Main road 35 - M3 motorway)	8 km
36	Polgár Main road Main road 35) - Tiszavasvári - Nyíregyháza (Main road 38)	50 km
37	Felsőzsolca (Main road 3) - Szerencs - Sárospatak - Sátoraljaújhely / Border with Slovakia	76 km
38	Tarcal (Main road Main road 37) - Tokaj - Rakamaz - Nyíregyháza (Main road 4)	37 km
381	Sátoraljaújhely (Main road 37) - Cigánd - Kisvárda (Main road 4)	47 km
39	Encs (Main road 3) - Abaújszántó - Mezőzombor (Main road 37)	36 km
401	M4 expressway - Main road 4 near Abony	1 km
402	Southern Introduction road of Szolnok (Main road 4 - Main road 32)	6 km
404	Eastern bypass of Üllő (M4 expressway – Main road 4); Old section of Main road 4	2 km
406	Abony (M4 expressway) – Szolnok (Main road 4-32)	4 km
427	Berettyóújfalu; Old section of Main road 42	3 km
430	Eastern bypass of Makó (M43 motorway - Main road 43)	8 km
431	Kiszombor (Main road 43) / Border with Romania	6 km
441	Cegléd (Main road 4) - Nagykőrös - Kecskemét (Main road 5)	31 km
442	Szolnok (Main road 4) - Martfű - Kunszentmárton (Main road 44)	43 km
443	Szarvas (Main road 44) - Gyomaendrőd (Main road 46)	19 km
444	Western bypass and Southern Introduction road of Békéscsaba	2 km
445	Northeastern bypass of Kecskemét (Main road 44 - Hetényegyháza)	13 km
446	Old Békéscsaba section of Main road 44	2 km
45	Kunszentmárton (Main road 44) - Szentes - Hódmezővásárhely (Main road 47)	53 km
451	Szentes (Main road 45) - Csongrád - Kiskunfélegyháza (Main road 5)	42 km
46	Törökszentmiklós (Main road 4) - Mezőtúr - Gyomaendrőd - Mezőberény (Main road 47)	66 km
47	Debrecen (Main road 4) - Berettyóújfalu - Szeghalom - Mezőberény - Békéscsaba - Orosháza - Hódmezővásárhely - Szeged (Main road 5)	215 km
470	Mezőberény (Main road 47) - Békés - Békéscsaba (Main road 446); Old section of Main road 47	21 km
471	Debrecen (Main road 4) - Nyíradony - Nyírbátor - Mátészalka (Main road 49)	73 km
472	Old Hódmezővásárhely section of Main road 47	7 km
474	Old Orosháza section of Main road 47	13 km
48	Debrecen (Main road 4) - Vámospércs - Nyírbátor / Border with Romania	30 km
481	Southern bypass of Debrecen (Main road 47 - M35 motorway)	6 km
49	Vaja (Main road 41) - Mátészalka - Csenger - Csengersima / Border with Romania	57 km
491	Győrtelek (Main road 49) - Fehérgyarmat - Tiszabecs / Border with Ukraine	20 km
493	Baktalórántháza (Main road 41) - Nyírbátor (Main road 471)	20 km
51	Soroksár (M0 expressway) - Solt - Kalocsa - Baja - Hercegszántó / Border with Serbia	191 km
510	Old Soroskár, Dunaharaszti and Taksony section of Main road 51	11 km
511	East bypass of Baja (Main road 51 - Main road 55)	4 km
512	Western bypass of Kalocsa	4 km
513	Old Dunavecse and Apostag section of Main road 51	8 km
52	Kecskemét (Main road 5) - Solt - Dunaföldvár (Main road 6)	64 km
53	Solt (Main road 52) - Kiskőrös - Soltvadkert - Kiskunhalas - Tompa / Border with Serbia	89 km
54	Kecskemét (Main roads 5-44) - Bugacpusztaháza - Soltvadkert - Sükösd (Main road 51)	92 km
541	Southern Introduction road of Kecskemét (Main road 5 - Main road 54)	4 km
542	Western bypass of Kiskunfélegyháza	9 km
55	Szeged (Main road 5) - Mórahalom - Mélykút - Baja - Bátaszék (M6 motorway)	122 km
551	Introduction road of Baja (Old section of Main Road 55)	2 km
56	Szekszárd (Main road 6) - Bátaszék - Mohács - Udvar / Border with Croatia	61 km
57	Pécs (Main road 6) - Bóly - Mohács	38 km
578	Eastern bypass of Pécs (Main road 6 - M60 motorway)	9 km
58	Pécs (Main road 6) - Harkány - Drávaszabolcs / Border with Croatia	33 km

Sign	Number	Route	Length
	61	Dunaföldvár - Cece - Simontornya - Tamási - Dombóvár - Kaposvár - Nagykanizsa (Intersection with Motorway M7)	195 km
	610	Kaposvár (old section of Main road 61)	16 km
	611	Dombóvár - Sásd	14 km
	62	Dunaújváros (Intersection with Main road 6) - Seregélyes - Székesfehérvár	47 km
	63	Szekszárd (Intersection with Main road 6) - Cece - Sárbogárd - Székesfehérvár (Intersection with Motorway M7)	90 km
	631	Motorway M6 - Main road 63	5 km
	64	Simontornya - Enying (Intersection with Main road 7)	37 km
	65	Szekszárd (Intersection with Main road 6) - Tamási - Siófok	85 km
	651	Tamási bypass (Main road 65 - Main road 61)	10 km
	66	Pécs - Sásd - Kaposvár (Intersection with Main roads 61 and 610)	54 km
	67	Szigetvár - Kaposvár - Balatonlelle	90 km
	68	Barcs - Nagyatád - Marcali - Balatonszentgyörgy (Intersection with Main roads 7 and 76)	95 km
	681	Nagyatád (Intersection with Main road 68) - Border with Croatia near Berzence	24 km
	682	Marcali (old section of Main road 68)	6 km
	71	Lepsény (Intersection with Main road 7) - Balatonfűzfő - Balatonalmádi - Balatonfüred - Balatonederics - Keszthely (Intersection with Main road 76)	116 km
	710	Balatonakarattya (Intersection with Main road 71) - Balatonfűzfő (Intersection with Main road 72)	17 km
	72	Balatonfűzfő - Litér - Veszprém (Intersection with Main road 8)	7 km
	73	Csopak (Intersection with Main road 71) - Veszprém (Intersection with Main road 8)	13 km
	74	Nagykanizsa (Intersection with Main road 7) - Bak - Zalaegerszeg - Vasvár (Intersection with Main road 8)	75 km
	75	Keszthely (Intersection with Main road 71) - Pacsa - Bak - Rédics	69 km
	76	Balatonszentgyörgy (Intersection with Main roads 7 and 68) - Sármellék - Zalaegerszeg - Nádasd (Intersection with Main road 86)	82 km
	760	Main road 75 - Hévíz - Main road 76	km
	761	Zalaegerszeg north bypass (Main road 74 - Main road 76)	km
	762	Zalaegerszeg (old section of Main road 76)	km
	77	Veszprém (Intersection with Main road 71) - Nagyvázsony - Tapolca - Lesencetomaj (Intersection with Main road 84)	54 km
	81	Székesfehérvár (Intersection with Main road 8) - Mór - Kisbér - Győr	81 km
	811	Székesfehérvár - Lovasberény - Felcsút - Bicske (Intersection with Main road 1)	42 km
	813	Győr northeast bypass (Intersection with Motorway M1 - Main road 14)	13 km
	82	Veszprém (Intersection with Main road 8) - Zirc - Pannonhalma - Győr	80 km
	821	Győr (Main road 83 - Main road 1)	3 km
	83	Városlőd (Intersection with Main road 8) - Pápa - Tét - Győr	76 km
	830	Veszprém north bypass (Main road 82 – Main road 8)	7 km
	832	Pápa (Intersection with Main road 83) - Pápateszér - Veszprémvarsány (Intersection with Main road 82)	30 km
	834	Pápa (Intersection with Main road 83) - Celldömölk - Sárvár-Hegyközség (Intersection with Main road 84)	41 km
	84	Balatonederics (Intersection with Main road 71) - Sümeg - Sárvár - Hegyfalu - Border with Austria near Sopron	132 km
	85	Győr (Intersection with Main road 1) - Csorna - Kapuvár - Nagycenk (Intersection with Main road 84)	72 km
	86	Mosonmagyaróvár - Csorna - Répcelak - Szombathely - Körmend - Zalalövő - Border with Slovenia near Rédics	159 km
	861	Border with Austria near Kópháza	2 km
	87	Kám - Rum - Szombathely - Border with Austria near Kőszeg	49 km
	88	Sárvár (Intersection with Main road 84) - Vát (Intersection with Main road 86)	12 km
	89	Szombathely (Intersection with Main road 87) - Torony - Border with Austria near Bucsu	18 km

=== Local roads ===
Minor, local roads in the country are designated as "local roads". The total length of these roads is 23,780 km and are marked with four or some five-digit numbers, while the rest have consisted of macadam and earthen roads.

== European routes ==
The following European routes pass through Hungary:

=== Class A ===
- E60: (France, Switzerland, Austria, Germany, Austria) – Hegyeshalom – Mosonmagyaróvár – Győr – Tatabánya – Budapest – Szolnok – Püspökladány – Ártánd – (Romania, Georgia, Azerbaijan, Turkmenistan, Uzbekistan, Tajikistan, Kyrgyzstan, China)
- E65: (Sweden, Poland, Czech Republic, Slovakia) – Rajka – Csorna – Szombathely – Körmend – Zalaegerszeg – Nagykanizsa – Letenye – (Croatia, Bosnia and Herzegovina, Croatia, Montenegro, Kosovo, North Macedonia, Greece)
- E66: (Italy, Austria) – Rábafüzes – Körmend – Ajka – Veszprém – Székesfehérvár – Dunaújváros – Kecskemét – Cegléd
- E68: Szeged – Makó – Csanádpalota – (Romania)
- E71: (Slovakia) – Tornyosnémeti – Miskolc – Füzesabony – Hatvan – Budapest – Székesfehérvár – Siófok – Nagykanizsa – Letenye – (Croatia)
- E73: Budapest – Dunaújváros – Paks – Szekszárd – Mohács – Udvar – (Croatia, Bosnia and Herzegovina)
- E75: (Norway, Finland, Poland, Czech Republic, Slovakia) – Rajka – Győr – Tatabánya – Budapest – Kecskemét – Szeged – Röszke – (Serbia, North Macedonia, Greece)
- E77: (Russia, Estonia, Latvia, Lithuania, Russia, Poland, Slovakia) – Parassapuszta – Vác – Budapest
- E79: Miskolc – Polgár – Debrecen – Berettyóújfalu – Ártánd – (Romania, Bulgaria, Greece)

=== Class B ===
- E573: Püspökladány – Debrecen – Nyíregyháza – Záhony – (Ukraine)
- E575: (Slovakia) – Vámosszabadi – Győr
- E579: Görbeháza – Nyíregyháza – Vásárosnamény – Beregdaróc
- E653: (Slovenia) – Tornyiszentmiklós – Letenye
- E661: Balatonkeresztúr – Nagyatád – Barcs – (Croatia, Bosnia and Herzegovina)

== See also ==
- Transport in Hungary
