= M3 motorway (Hungary) =

Road in Hungary

M3 motorway
- M3-as autópálya
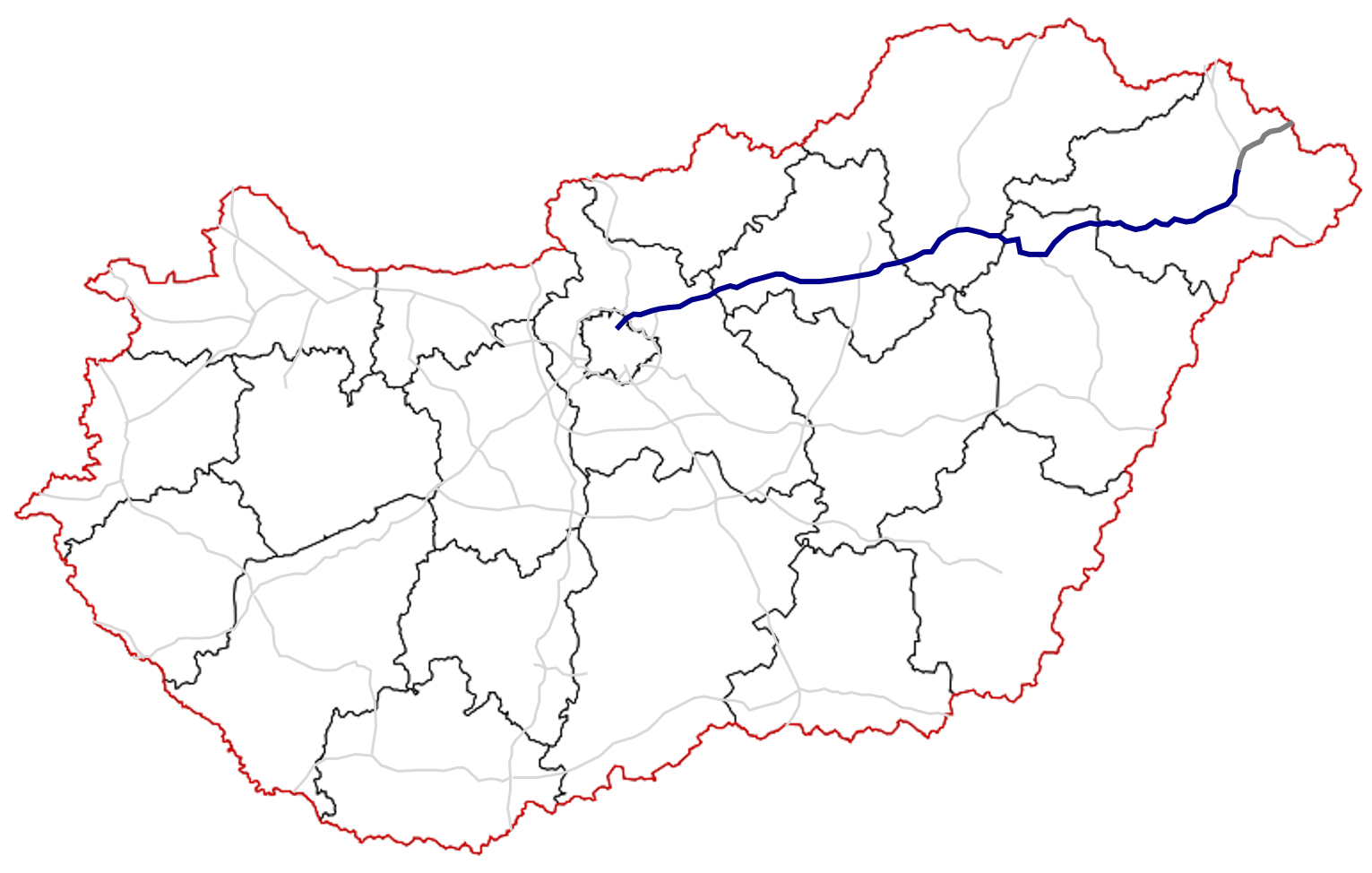
- in use planned

Route information
- Part of E71 / E79 / E573 / E579
- Length: 281 km (175 mi) 307 km (191 mi) planned
- Existed: 1978–present

Major junctions
- From: Budapest
- M0 near Fót; M31 in Gödöllő; 21, 32 in Hatvan; M25, 33 near Füzesabony; 331 near Mezőkövesd; M30 near Emőd; 35 near Polgár; M35 near Görbeháza; 338, 4, 403 near Nyíregyháza; M49, 49 near Őr; 41 near Vásárosnamény
- To: Barabás; M 24 border with Ukraine

Location
- Country: Hungary
- Counties: Pest, Heves, Borsod-Abaúj-Zemplén, Hajdú-Bihar, Szabolcs-Szatmár-Bereg
- Major cities: Budapest, Hatvan, Gyöngyös, Füzesabony, Polgár, Nyíregyháza

Highway system
- Roads in Hungary; Highways; Main roads; Local roads

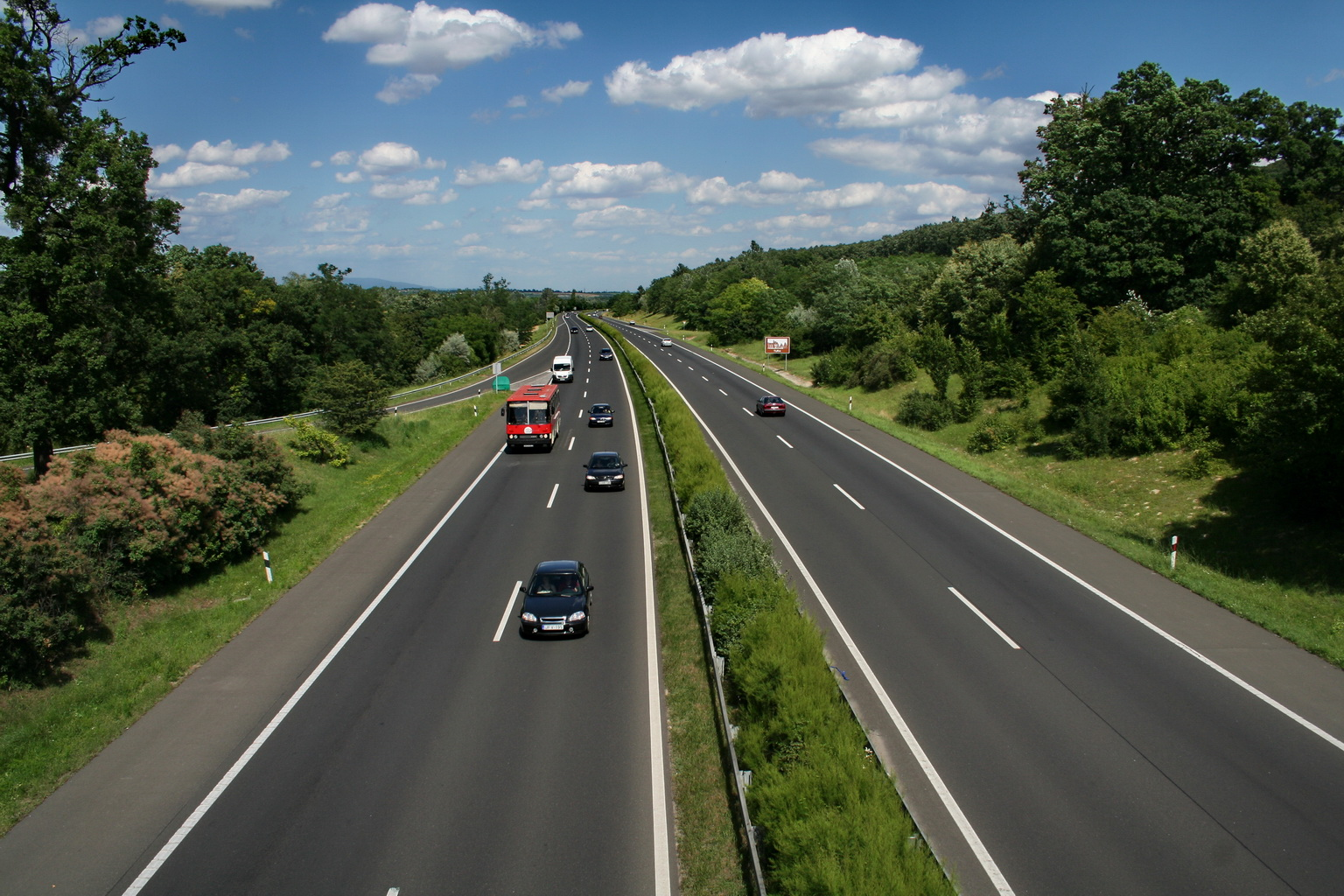
The motorway near Kisbagi rest area

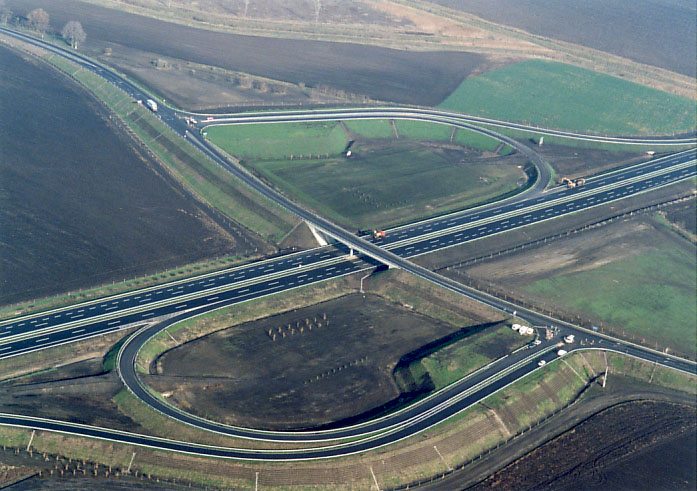
Junction in the road

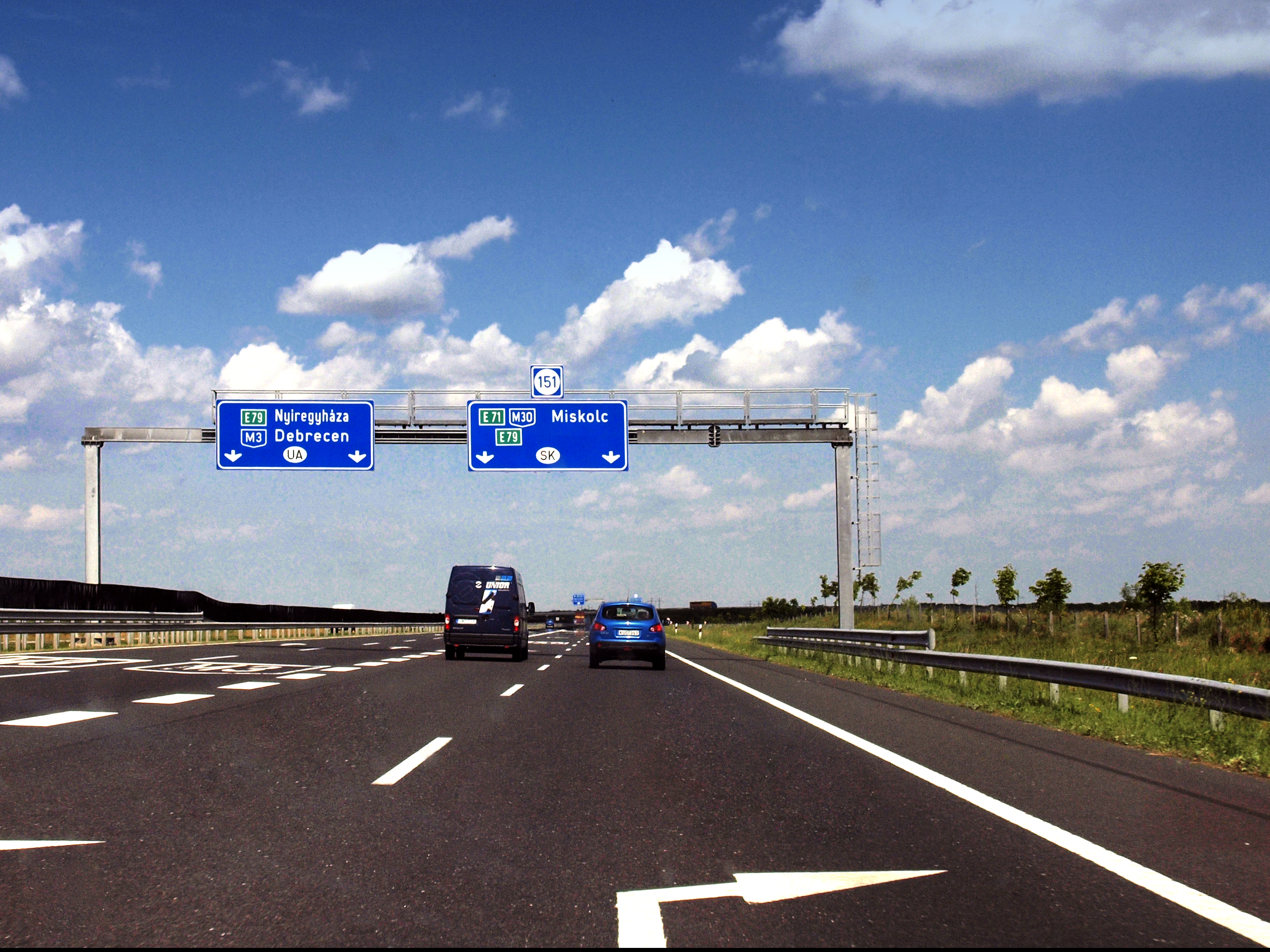
Junction (M3-M30) near Emőd

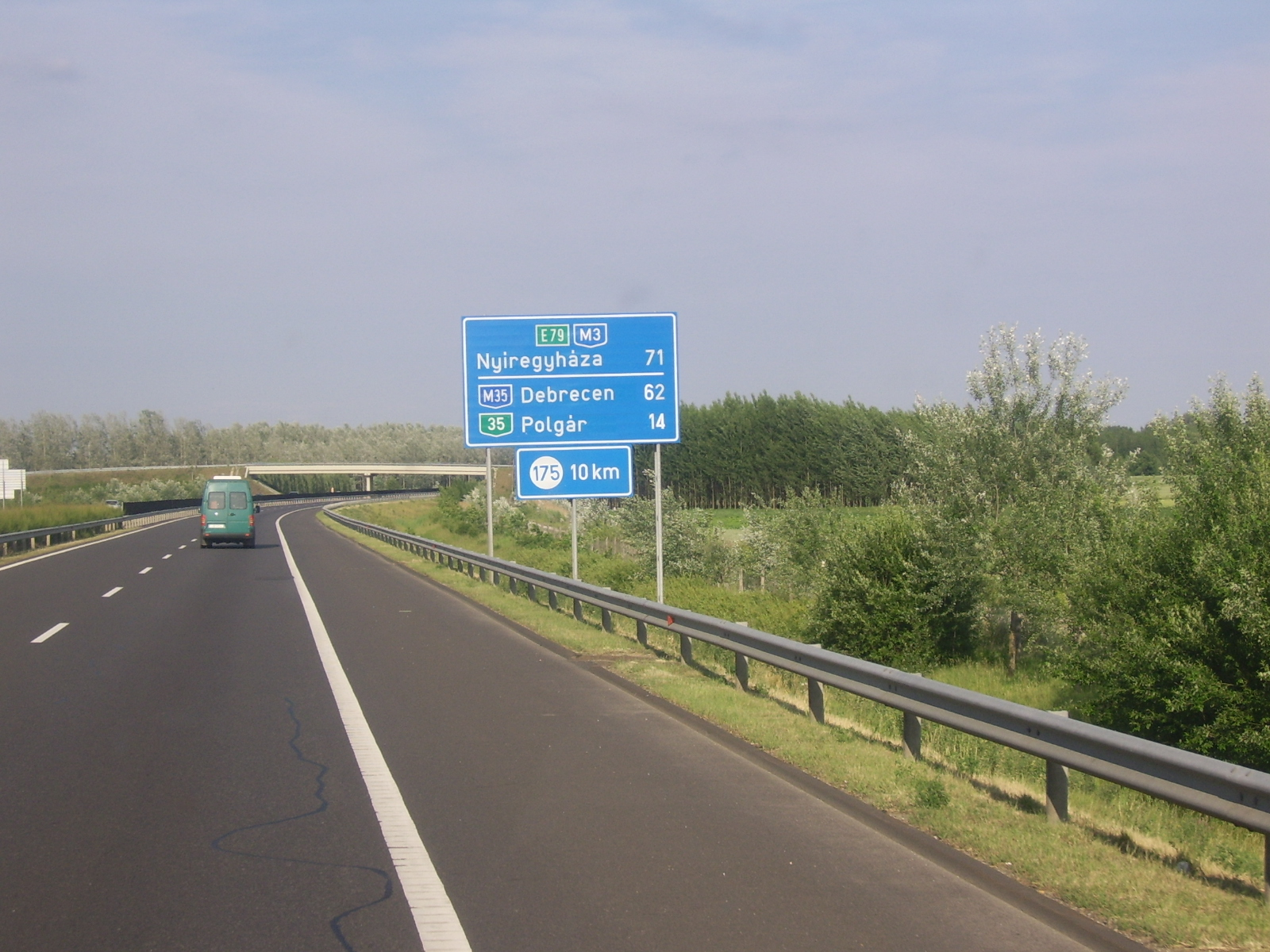
Near Hejőkürt

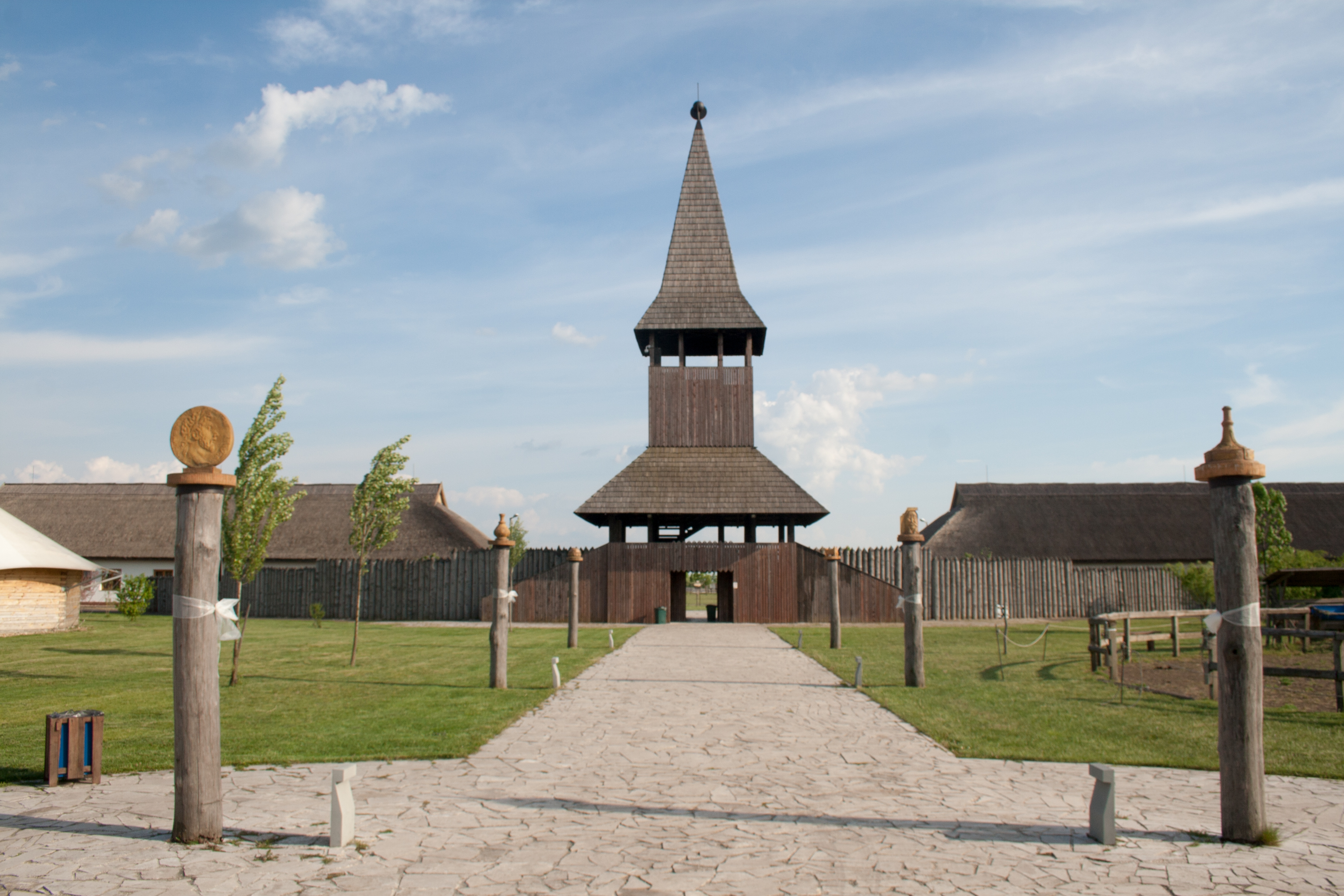
The main entrance of M3 Archeopark

The M3 motorway (Hungarian: M3-as autópálya) is a Hungarian motorway connecting Budapest to Vásárosnamény. It will eventually connect Budapest to the Ukrainian border. Two other motorways branch off it, the M30 (connecting the M3 to Miskolc) and the M35 (connecting the M3 to Debrecen). The M3 follows route 3, and, later, route 4. The section of the motorway between Görbeháza and Nyíregyháza was opened to traffic in August 2007. The section of the motorway between Highway 49 and Vásárosnamény was opened to the public in 2014. The current length of the motorway completed is 281 km.

== Openings timeline ==
- Budapest – Gödöllő (14 km): 1978.10.16.
- Gödöllő – Hatvan (29 km): 1980.10.31.
- Hatvan – Gyöngyös-west (15 km): 1983
- Gyöngyös-west – Füzesabony (44 km): 1998.09.01.
- Füzesabony – Polgár (61 km): 2002
- Polgár – Görbeháza; M35 (11 km): 2004.10.
- Görbeháza; M35 – Nyíregyháza (41 km): 2007.08.31.
- Nyíregyháza bypass (8 km): 2006.08.05.
- Nagykálló – Őr (33,8 km): 2013.01.16.
- Őr – Vásárosnamény (11,9 km): 2014.10.10.

== List of junctions, exits and rest area ==
Distance from Zero Kilometre Stone (Adam Clark Square) in Budapest in kilometres.

- The route is full length motorway. The maximum speed limit is 130 km/h, with (2x2 lane road with stop lane).

km		Destinations	Route	Notes
10	Exit	Budapest		Introductory path of M3
11	Exit	Újpalota, Újpest	2102	
12	Rest area	Szilas pihenőhely		Rest area: Shell / Shell +
12	Exit	Dunakeszi, Vác		
13	Interchange	M3-M0 interchange (Budapest bypass)	M0	Connection to Győr, Székesfehérvár, Pécs, Szeged, Budapest International Airport, Szolnok and Vác.
18	Rest area	Ring pihenőhely		Temporary rest area, toward to Hungaroring circuit:
19	Exit	Mogyoród-nyugat, Fót, Hungaroring	2139	Western connection to Mogyoród
23	Exit	Mogyoród-kelet, Hungaroring, Szada	21109	
25	Rest area	Jakabpusztai pihenőhely		Rest area: Lukoil / Lukoil +
27	Interchange	M3-M31 interchange	M31; E71	Unloading road, connection to M0. The western terminus of European routes E71
27	Exit	Vác, Gödöllő	30870	
32	Rest area	Babati pihenő		Rest area, towards only Nyíregyháza:
36	Rest area	Kisbagi pihenőhely		Rest area:
39	Exit	Bag, Aszód, Tura	3105	
43	Rest area	Galga pihenőhely		Rest area:
Border of Pest and Heves Counties
51	Rest area	Kerekharaszti pihenőhely		Rest area: MOL / MOL +
51	Exit	Kerekharaszt	2134	
55	Exit	Hatvan-nyugat, Salgótarján, Galyatető	21	Western connection to Hatvan
59	Exit	Hatvan-kelet, Szolnok	32	Eastern bypass to Hatvan
60	Rest area	Horti pihenőhely		Rest area:
66	Rest area	Ecsédi pihenőhely		Rest area:
70 km	Exit	Gyöngyös-nyugat, Hort	3	Access route of Gyöngyös
75	Rest area	Halászaranyosi pihenőhely		Rest area:
78	Exit	Gyöngyös-kelet, Mátrafüred, Adács	3210	Eastern connection to Gyöngyös
82	Rest area	Borsókúti pihenőhely		Rest area: OMV / OMV +
87	Rest area	Nagyfügedi pihenőhely		Rest area:
90	Exit	Nagyfüged, Heves, Ludas	3206	
92	Rest area	Kisasszonytéri pihenőhely		Rest area:
103	Exit	Kál, Erdőtelek	3208	
104	Bridge	Bridge over Railway Line 102 (Kál-Kápolna-Kisújszállás)		
106	Rest area	Rekettyés pihenőhely		Rest area: MOL / MOL +
108	Interchange	M3-M25 interchange	M25	Access route of Eger
114	Exit	Füzesabony, Eger, Jászberény	33	
122	Rest area	Mezőszemerei pihenőhely		Rest area:
Border of Heves and Borsod-Abaúj-Zemplén Counties
128	Exit	Mezőkövesd, Borsodivánka	331; 3302	
139	Exit	Mezőnagymihály, Mezőkeresztes	3305	
142	Rest area	Geleji pihenőhely		Rest area: Shell / Shell +
151	Interchange	M3-M30 interchange	M30; E71; E79	Connection to M30 motorway, towards to Slovakia, via Miskolc; The eastern terminus of European routes E71, and the northern of E79
153	Rest area	Igrici pihenőhely		Rest area:
156	Exit	Mezőcsát, Hejőpapi	3307	
164	Exit	Hejőkürt, Tiszaújváros	3313	
169	Bridge	Tisza (Bridge - 405.5 m)		
Border of Borsod-Abaúj-Zemplén and Hajdú-Bihar Counties
171	Rest area	Polgári pihenőhely		Rest area:
175	Exit	Nyékládháza, Polgár	35	
175	Arcehopark	M3 Arcehopark		Archeological and landscape historical skansen
179	Bridge	Western Main Channel (Bridge - 93 m)		
184	Rest area	Görbeháza pihenőhely		Rest area: MOL / MOL +
187	Interchange	Görbeháza; M3-M35 interchange	M35; E79	Connection to M35 motorway, towards to Romania, via Debrecen; The southern terminus of European routes E79
194	Rest area	Rétaljai pihenőhely ( E579)		Rest area:. The western terminus of European routes E579
200	Bridge	Eastern Main Channel (Bridge)		
203	Exit	Hajdúnánás, Tiszavasvári	3502	
206	Rest area	Hajdúnánási pihenőhely		Rest area:
Border of Hajdú-Bihar and Szabolcs-Szatmár-Bereg Counties
215	Rest area	Kálmánházi pihenőhely		Rest area: Mobil Petrol / Mobil Petrol +
221	Exit	Nyíregyháza-nyugat, Kálmánháza	338	Western bypass of Nyíregyháza, toward to Tokaj
227	Exit	Nyíregyháza-dél, Debrecen	4 E573	The western terminus of European routes E573
229	Rest area	Nyíregyházi pihenőhely		Rest area:
234	Exit	Nyíregyháza-kelet, Nagykálló	4911	
234	Exit	Nyíregyháza-észak, Záhony	403; E573	Eastern bypass of Nyíregyháza, and terminus of European routes E573
244	Rest area	Mohos pihenőhely		Rest area: ? +
254	Exit	Ófehértó	4105	Connection to Nyírbátor or Baktalórántháza
263	Rest area	Kántorjánosi pihenőhely		Rest area:
267	Interchange	Vaja, Mátészalka; M3-M49 interchange	49; M49	
280	Roundabout	Vásárosnamény	41	
	Exit	Vásárosnamény-észak, Ilk	4108	
286	Interchange	M3-M34 interchange	M34	Connection to Záhony
288	Exit	Kisvarsány, Nagyvarsány	4115	
289	Bridge	Tisza (Bridge - 210 m)		
292	Exit	Tiszaszalka, Gergelyiugurnya	4113	
	Rest area	Vámosatyai pihenőhely		Rest area:
301	Exit	Gelénes, Barabás	4124	
307	Border control	Beregdaróc (H) – Luzhanka (UA) border crossing		
M24 highway → to Mukachevo, Ukraine

- Under construction, Planned section

== Maintenance ==
The operation and maintenance of the road by Hungarian Public Road Nonprofit Pte Ltd Co. This activity is provided by these highway engineers.

- near Gödöllő, kilometre trench 23
- near Kál, kilometre trench 103
- near Emőd, kilometre trench 151
- near Hajdúnánás, kilometre trench 204
- near Újfehértó, kilometre trench 254

== Payment ==
Hungarian system has 2 main type in terms of salary:

1, time-based fee vignettes (E-matrica); with a validity of either 10 days (3500 HUF), 1 month (4780 HUF) or 1 year (42980 HUF).

2, county vignettes (Megyei matrica); the highway can be used instead of the national sticker with the following county stickers:

Type of vignette	Available section
Pest County	between Szentmihályi Street junction and Hatvan west (11 km – 55 km)
Heves County	between Bag and Mezőkövesd (39 km – 128 km)
Borsod-Abaúj-Zemplén County	between Füzesabony and Polgár (114 km – 175 km)
Hajdú-Bihar County	between Hejőkürt and Nyíregyháza west (164 km – 221 km)
Szabolcs-Szatmár-Bereg County	between Hajdúnánás and Vásárosnamény (203 km – 280 km)

== Significant artifacts ==
From Budapest to the Ukrainian border, the M3 motorway features the following bridges, tunnels or covered cuts:

Bridge

- Tisza Bridge of Polgár (Polgári Tisza-híd; 405.5 m or 1,330 ft) over Tisza river

Landscape history memorial park

- M3 Arcehopark – Open-air museum near this motorway

Outlet center

- M3 Outlet Center

== European Route(s) ==
Name	Route
	124 km	Emőd (151) – Gödöllő (27)
	89 km	Rétaljai pihenőhely (191) – Vásárosnamény (280)
	36 km	Emőd (151) – Görbeháza (187)
	7 km	Nyíregyháza-south (227) – Nyíregyháza-north (234)

== See also ==
- Roads in Hungary
- Transport in Hungary
- International E-road network
