= Main road 41 (Hungary) =

Road in Hungary

Main road 41
- 41-es főút
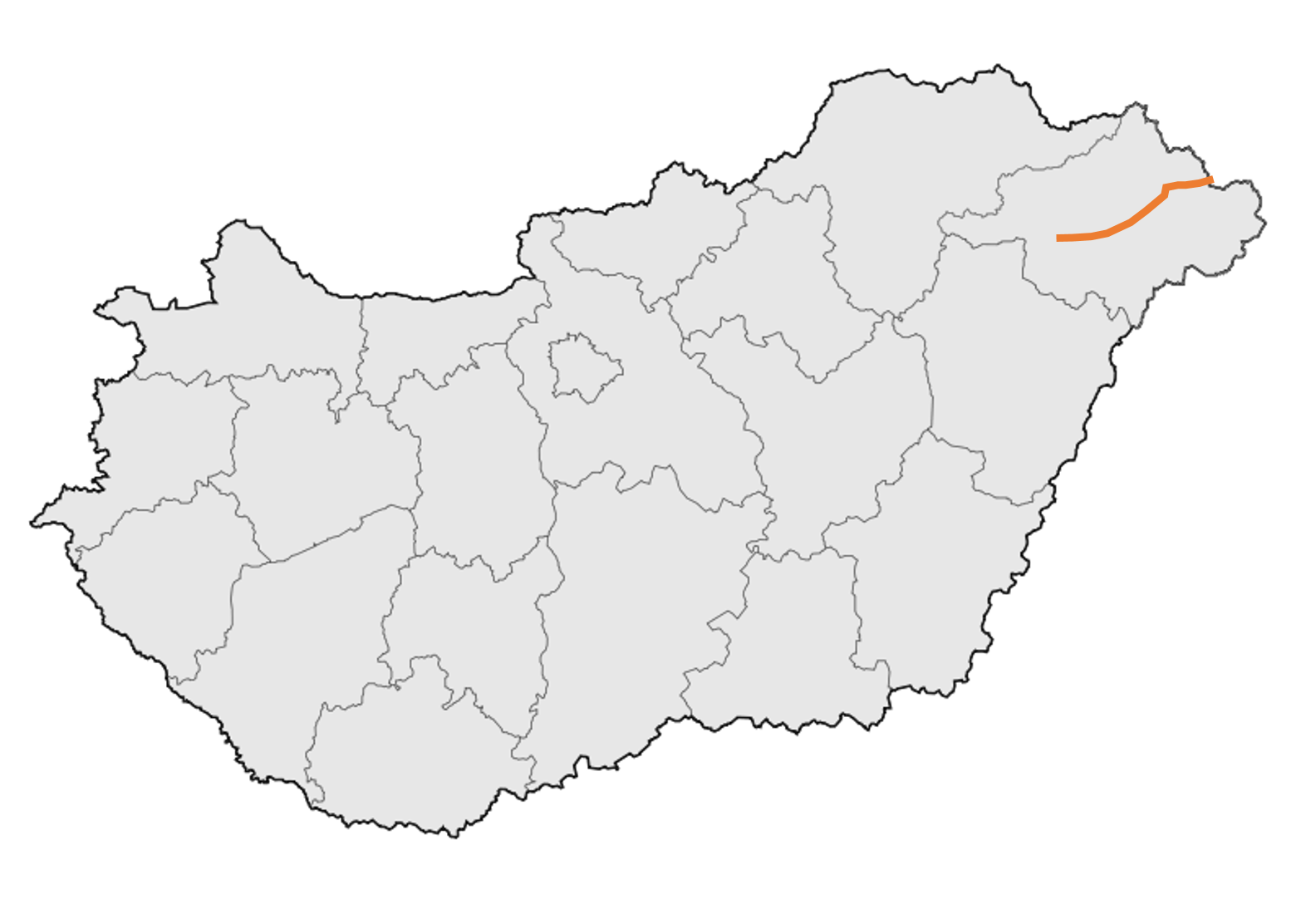

Route information
- Part of E579
- Length: 73 km (45 mi)

Major junctions
- From: 4 in Nyíregyháza
- 403 near Nyíregyháza; 49 near Vaja; M3 near Vásárosnamény
- To: Beregsurány; M 24 border with Ukraine

Location
- Country: Hungary
- Counties: Szabolcs-Szatmár-Bereg
- Major cities: Nyíregyháza, Baktalórántháza, Vaja, Nyírmada, Vásárosnamény

Highway system
- Roads in Hungary; Highways; Main roads; Local roads

The Main road 41 (Hungarian: 41-es főút) is a west–east direction First class main road in Hungary, that connects Nyíregyháza (the Main road 4 change) with Beregsurány (the border of Ukraine). The road is 73 kilometres (45 mi) long. Most of the traffic was taken over by the M3 motorway.

The road, as well as all other main roads in Hungary, is managed and maintained by Magyar Közút, state owned company.

== See also ==
- Roads in Hungary
