= M25 expressway (Hungary) =

Road in Hungary

M25 expressway
- M25-ös autóút
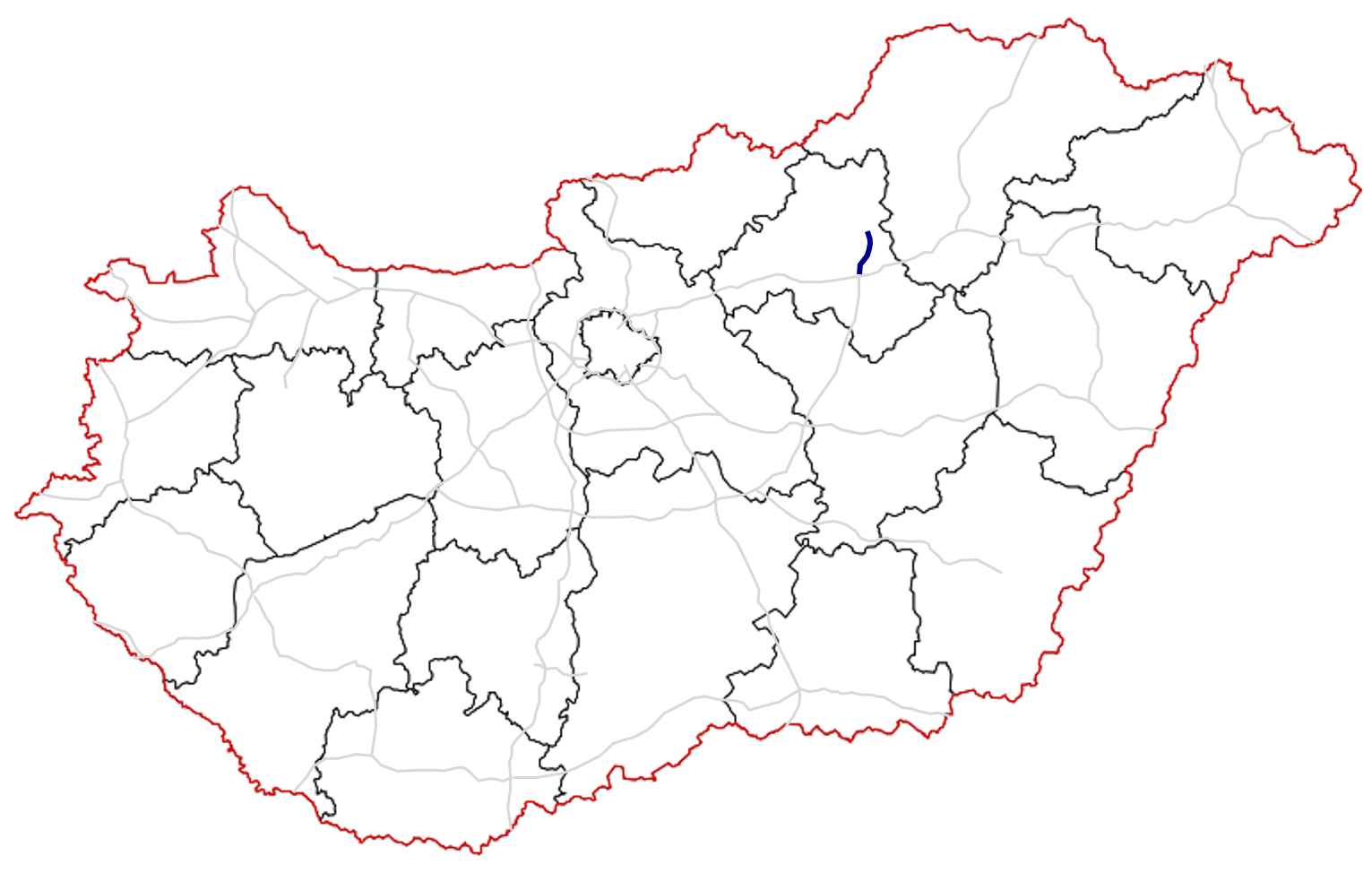
- in use other highways

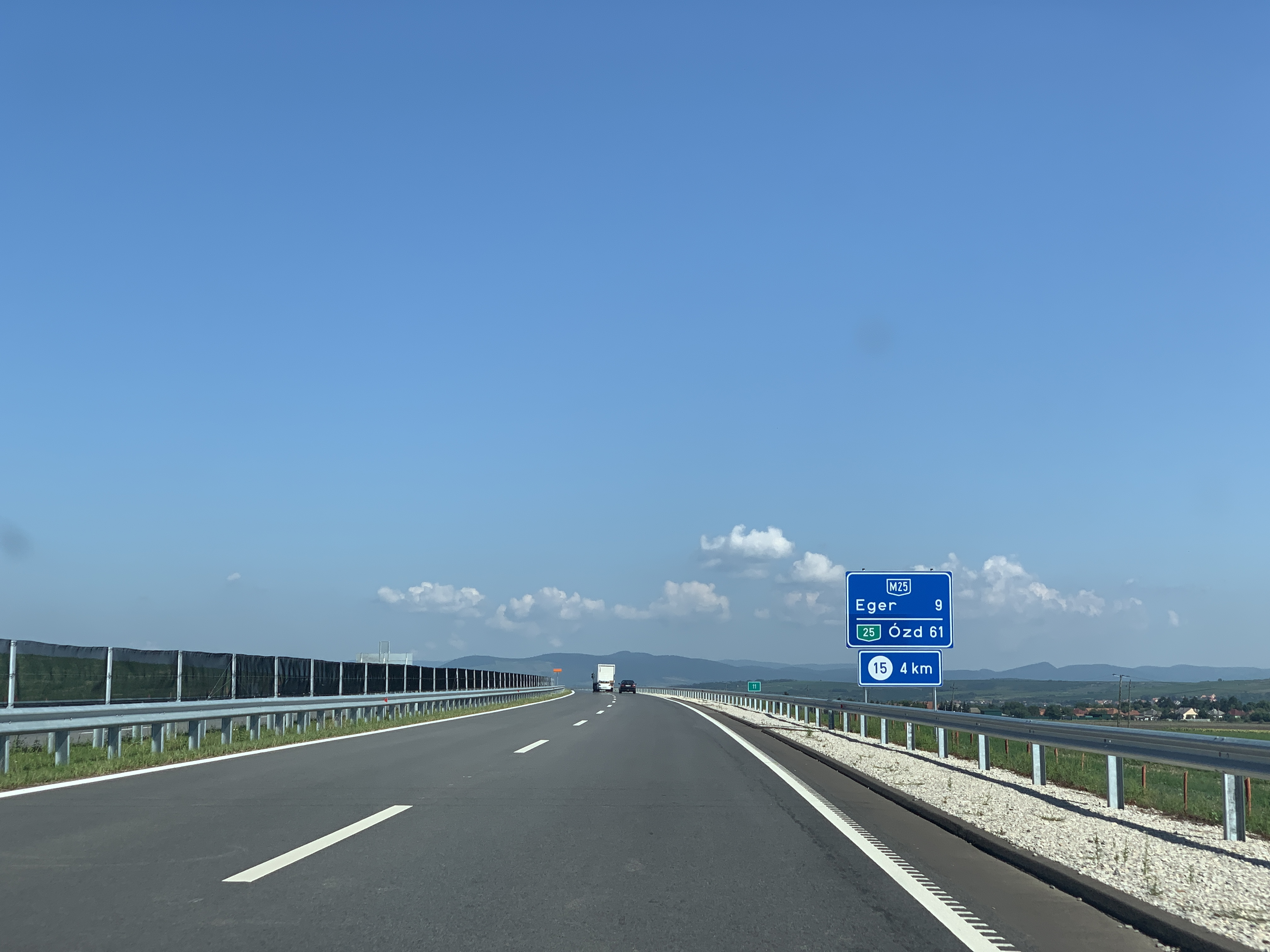
- M25 near Eger

Route information
- Length: 19 km (12 mi)
- Existed: 2018–present

Major junctions
- From: M3 near Füzesabony
- 3 near Kerecsend; 253 near Andornaktálya
- To: 252 in Eger

Location
- Country: Hungary
- Counties: Heves
- Major cities: Eger

Highway system
- Roads in Hungary; Highways; Main roads; Local roads

The M25 expressway (Hungarian: M25-ös autóút) is a short north–south highway in Hungary. It connects the M3 motorway to the city of Eger.

== Timeline ==
Section	Length	Opened	Notes
Kál (M3) – Andornaktálya	14.5 km (9.01 mi)	20 July 2020	Segment South, built between 2018 – 2020.
Andornaktálya – Eger	4.0 km (2.49 mi)	7 November 2018	Segment North, built between 2017 – 2018.

== Route description ==
- The route is full length expressway. The maximum speed limit is 110 km/h, with (2x2 lane road).

County	km	Type	Destination	Notes
Heves	0	Interchange	M3 / E71 – Budapest, Gyöngyös M3 / E71 – Nyíregyháza, Miskolc (M30), Debrecen (M35)	The southern terminus of the expressway. Kilometrage starting point trumpet interchange
Heves	6	Bridge	Laskó híd	híd means Bridge
Heves	7	Exit	Main road 3 – Kerecsend / Main road 33 – Füzesabony	
Heves	10	Exit	Main road 251 – Maklár, Bosch factory	
Heves	15	Exit	Main road 253 – Mezőkövesd, Andornaktálya	
Heves	19	Roundabout	Main road 252 – Eger Centrum, towards to Main road 25 → Ózd	The northern terminus of the expressway.
1.000 mi = 1.609 km; 1.000 km = 0.621 mi: Concurrency terminus; Incomplete access; Unopened

== Maintenance ==
The operation and maintenance of the road by Hungarian Concession Infrastructure Development Plc. This activity is provided by this highway engineer.

- near Kál (M3), kilometre trench 103

== Payment ==
Hungarian system has 2 main type in terms of salary:

1, time-based fee vignettes (E-matrica);

- Cars, vans and motorbikes up to 3.5 tonnes only need to buy a single vignette which costs 6,400 Hungarian forint (Ft) for 10 days, 10,360 Ft for 1 month and 57,260 Ft for a year, from 1 January 2024.

2, county vignettes (Megyei matrica); the highway can be used instead of the national sticker with the following county stickers:

Type of county vignette	Available section
Heves	full length (0 km – 19 km)

== See also ==
- Roads in Hungary
- Transport in Hungary
