= Main road 403 (Hungary) =

Road in Hungary

Main road 403
- 403-as főút
- Eastern bypass of Nyíregyháza
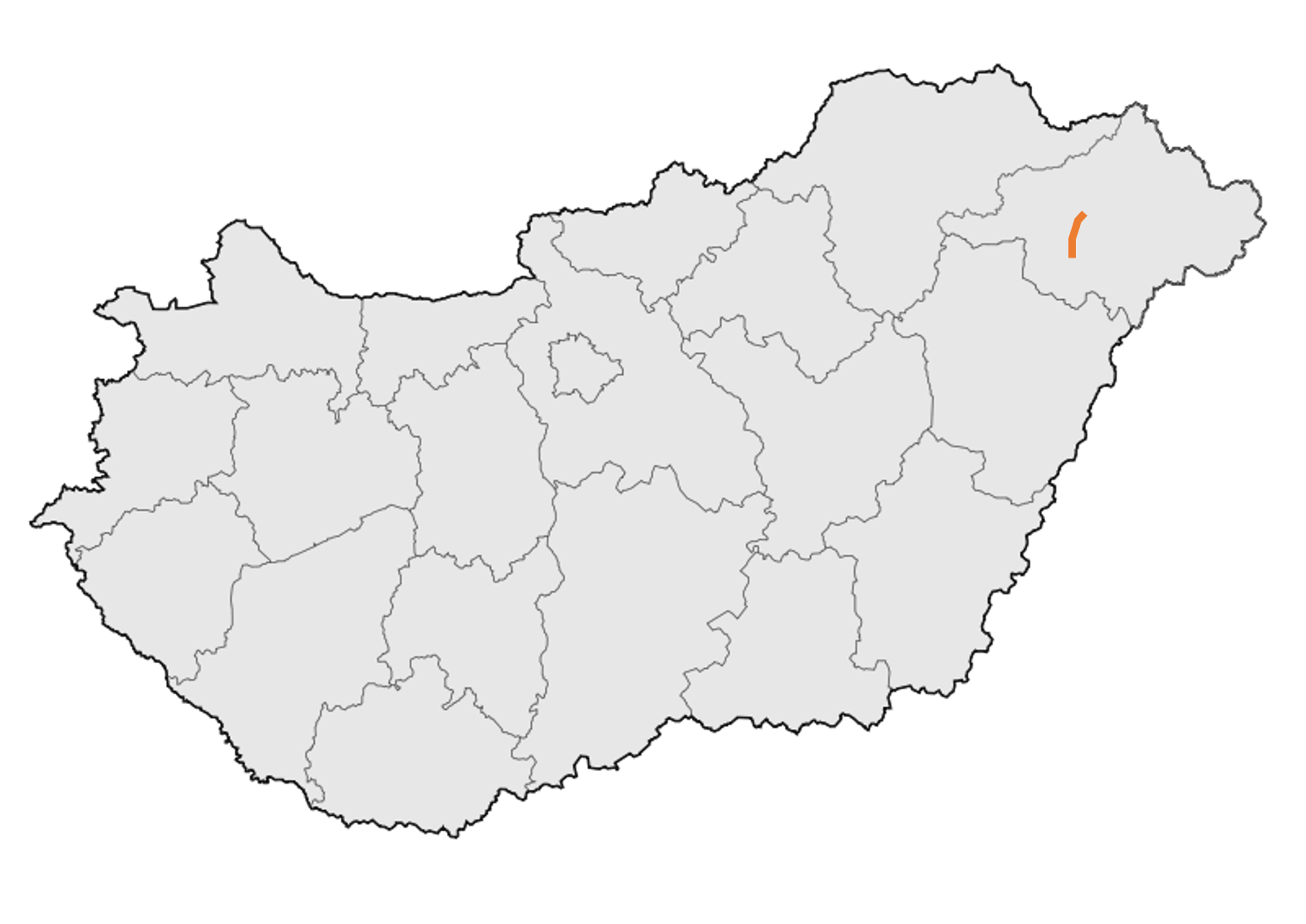

Route information
- Part of E573
- Length: 14 km (8.7 mi)
- History: 2006–2008

Major junctions
- From: M3 in Nyíregyháza-kelet
- 41 in Oros
- To: 4 near Nyírtura

Location
- Country: Hungary
- Counties: Szabolcs-Szatmár-Bereg
- Major cities: Nyíregyháza

Highway system
- Roads in Hungary; Highways; Main roads; Local roads

The Main road 403 (Hungarian: 403-as főút) is a short bypass direction First class main road near Nyíregyháza, that connects the Nyírgegyháza-kelet junction in M3 motorway to the Main road 4 near Nyírmada. The road is 14 kilometres (8.7 mi) long.

The road, as well as all other main roads in Hungary, is managed and maintained by Magyar Közút, a state owned company.

== See also ==
- Roads in Hungary
