= Main road 338 (Hungary) =

Road in Hungary

Main road 338
- 338-as főút

Route information
- Length: 15 km (9.3 mi)
- History: 2013–2019

Major junctions
- From: M3 in Nyíregyháza-nyugat
- 36 in Nyugati Ipari Park
- To: 38, 3822 near Felsőpázsit

Location
- Country: Hungary
- Counties: Szabolcs-Szatmár-Bereg
- Major cities: Nyíregyháza

Highway system
- Roads in Hungary; Highways; Main roads; Local roads

The Main road 338 is a short bypass direction Secondary class main road near Nyíregyháza, that connects the M3 motorway's Nyíregyháza-nyugat junction to the Main road 37 and Local road 3822. The road is 15 kilometres (9.3 mi) long.

The road, as well as all other main roads in Hungary, is managed and maintained by Magyar Közút, state owned company.

== See also ==
- Roads in Hungary
