= Tiszaszalka =

Coordinates: 48°11′N 22°19′E

- Village
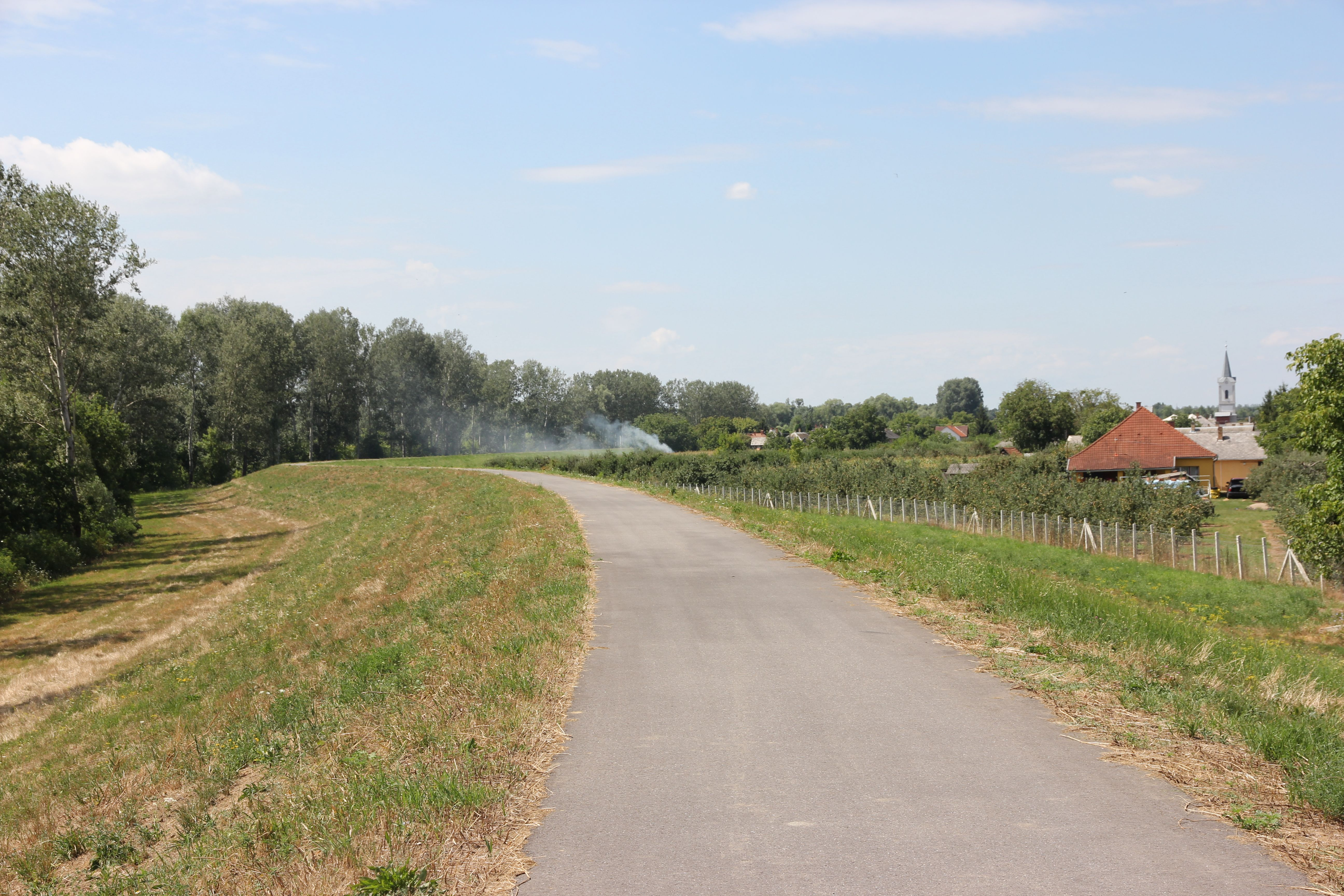
- Flood defence barrier with Reformed Church in distance

- Coat of arms

- Country: Hungary
- County: Szabolcs-Szatmár-Bereg

Area
  - Total: 15.20 km^{2} (5.87 sq mi)

Population (2015)
  - Total: 870
  - Density: 58.2/km^{2} (151/sq mi)
- Time zone: UTC+1 (CET)
  - Summer (DST): UTC+2 (CEST)
- Postal code: 4831
- Area code: 45
- Website: http://www.tiszaszalka.hu

Tiszaszalka is a village in Szabolcs-Szatmár-Bereg county, in the Northern Great Plain region of eastern Hungary.

== Geography ==
It covers an area of 15.20 km^{2} (6 sq mi) and has a population of 870 people (2015).

The village is centred on a Reformed Church and school building, both rebuilt in recent years following Flooding.

Recent improvements to the flood defence system (raised earth berm) separating the village from the river Tisza, has allowed the emergency services and local population to use the berm as a vehicle and bicycle route.

Recent improvements in road infrastructure, namely the construction of the M3 motorway, has made the region more easily accessible from the west.

== History ==
There is a legend associated with the establishment and naming of the village. This is about the fact that a team of our conquering ancestors followed the line of the Tisza in search of a camp residence. Such was found on a hill protected from the waters and wild, protected from the curved river bend. A tent was beaten. To beat their hunger, fish were caught from nearby stagnant and river waters. Their eating was slowed by herringbone. Referring to the filthy dinner, the place was called “Strand” behind them. Later, due to its proximity to the river, it was prefixed with the Tisza.

The name Tiszaszalka (Zalka) first appears in 1289, under the name Zalka, (Dl. 12 51.) at the division of one of the branches of the Gutkeled clan, as a purchased estate, which Mátyás Atyai and Pál gave to Lőrincz of Balkány.

In 1330, the sons of László Balkányi first pledged Szalka for 62 M and then sold it to Master Pál Magyar (dictus) for another 38 M (100 M in total). In a new contract of sale of 1331, its accessories are also listed, when its wooden chapel dedicated to All Saints is also mentioned. In 1331 it was written on the border of Bács (Szabolcs vm). It was written in a charter dated 1299 as a neighbor of Vid (Tiszavid). In 1369 it was the property of Elizabeth, the mother of King Louis the Great.

Records from 1595 already report a populous Reformed community. From 1764, the Reformed already kept a register.

During the Revolution and the War of Independence in 1848–49, the young people of the village were sworn into the 10th Honvéd Battalion. In 1880 the settlement was the seat of the Kaszonyi district.

In 1925, the Roman Catholic Church was established in the village, and within a few years it became a chapel.

World War I and World War II also claimed many lives in the village.
