= Main road 49 (Hungary) =

Road in Hungary

Main road 49
- 49-es főút

Route information
- Length: 57 km (35 mi)

Major junctions
- From: 41 near Vaja
- M3 near Őr; 471 in Mátészalka; 491 in Győrtelek
- To: Csengersima; DN19A border with Romania

Location
- Country: Hungary
- Counties: Szabolcs-Szatmár-Bereg
- Major cities: Vaja, Mátészalka, Csenger

Highway system
- Roads in Hungary; Highways; Main roads; Local roads

The Main road 49 is a west–east direction Secondary class main road, that connects the Main road 41 change to the border of Romania. The road is 57 kilometres (35 mi) long.

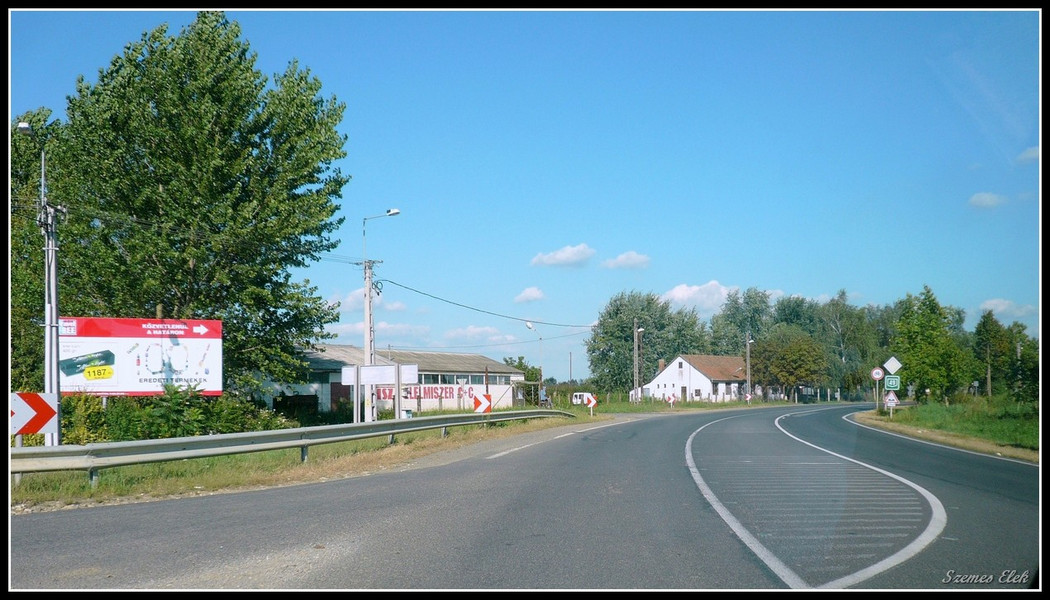
Main road 49 (Hungary)

The road, as well as all other main roads in Hungary, is managed and maintained by Magyar Közút, state owned company.

== See also ==
- Roads in Hungary
