= Main road 331 (Hungary) =

Highway in Hungary

Main road 331
- 331-es főút
- Southern bypass of Mezőkövesd

Route information
- Length: 6 km (3.7 mi)

Major junctions
- From: 3 in Mezőkövesd-Zsórifürdő
- To: M3 near Mezőkövesd

Location
- Country: Hungary
- Counties: Borsod-Abaúj-Zemplén
- Major cities: Mezőkövesd

Highway system
- Roads in Hungary; Highways; Main roads; Local roads

The Main road 331 is a short bypass direction Secondary class main road near Mezőkövesd in Hungary, that connects the M3 motorway's Mezőkövesd interchange to Main road 3. The road is 6 km long.

The road, like all other main roads in Hungary, is managed and maintained by Magyar Közút, the state-owned company.

== See also ==
- Roads in Hungary
- Transport in Hungary
