= Hejőkürt =

- Village
- Flag Coat of arms

- Location of Hejőkürt
- Coordinates: 47.857281°N 20.994189°E
- Country: Hungary
- Region: Northern Hungary
- County: Borsod-Abaúj-Zemplén
- District: Tiszaújváros

Area
  - Total: 14.91 km^{2} (5.76 sq mi)

Population (1 January 2025)
  - Total: 257
  - Density: 17.2/km^{2} (44.6/sq mi)
- Time zone: UTC+1 (CET)
  - Summer (DST): UTC+2 (CEST)
- Postal code: 3588
- Area code: (+36) 49
- Website: www.hejokurt.hu

Hejőkürt is a village in Borsod-Abaúj-Zemplén County in northeastern Hungary.
