= Main road 491 (Hungary) =

Road in Hungary

Main road 491
- 491-es főút

Route information
- Length: 38 km (24 mi)

Major junctions
- From: 49 in Győrtelek
- To: Tiszabecs; M 26 border with Ukraine

Location
- Country: Hungary
- Counties: Szabolcs-Szatmár-Bereg
- Major cities: Fehérgyarmat

Highway system
- Roads in Hungary; Highways; Main roads; Local roads

The Main road 491 is a west–east direction Secondary class main road, that connects the Main road 49 change to the border of Ukraine. The road is 38 kilometres (24 mi) long.

The road, as well as all other main roads in Hungary, is managed and maintained by Magyar Közút, state owned company.

== See also ==
- Roads in Hungary
