= Barabás =

Place in Hungary

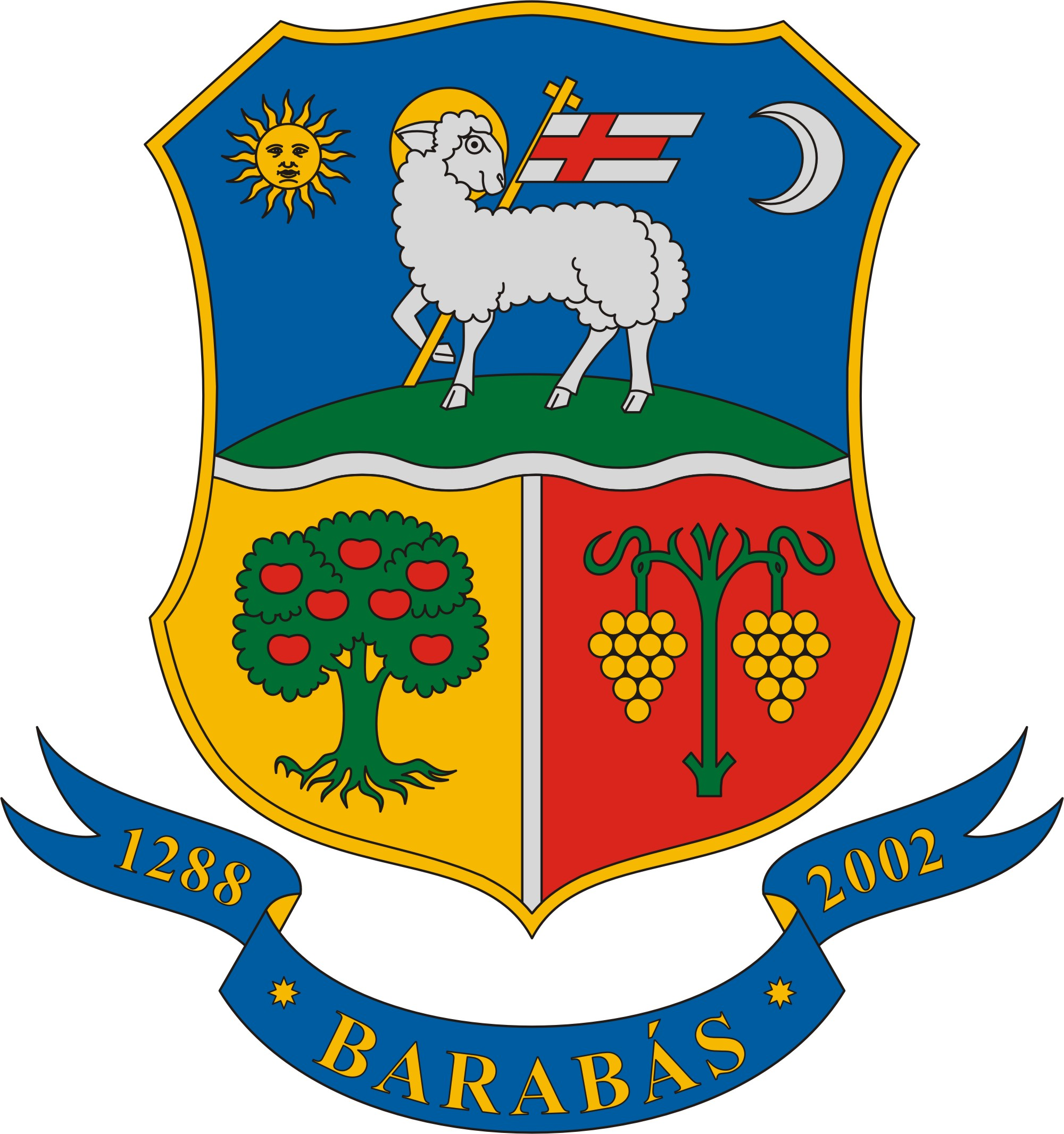
- Coat of arms

- Location of Barabás in Hungary
- Coordinates: 48.23°N 22.43°E
- Country: Hungary
- Region: Northern Great Plain
- County: Szabolcs-Szatmár-Bereg

Area
  - Total: 38.19 km^{2} (14.75 sq mi)

Population (2012)
  - Total: 746
  - Density: 19.5/km^{2} (50.6/sq mi)
- Time zone: UTC+1 (CET)
  - Summer (DST): UTC+2 (CEST)
- Postal code: 4397
- Area code: +36 45
- Website: https://barabas.hu/

Barabás is a village in Szabolcs-Szatmár-Bereg county, in the Northern Great Plain region of eastern Hungary.

Jews settled in Barabás in the middle of the 19th century. The synagogue of the Orthodox community was built in 1910. There is a Jewish cemetery on the site.

In 1944, after the German occupation, all the Jews of the village were deported to the Auschwitz extermination camp; only two of them survived after the war.

== Geography ==
It covers an area of 38.19 km^{2} (15 sq mi) and has a population of 855 people (2001).
