= European route E573 =

Road in trans-European E-road network

E573

Route information
- Length: 193 km (120 mi)

Major junctions
- From: Püspökladány
- Debrecen; Nyíregyháza; Chop
- To: Uzhhorod

Location
- Countries: Hungary; Ukraine

Highway system
- International E-road network; A Class; B Class

E 573 is a B-class European route connecting Püspökladány in Hungary to Uzhhorod in Ukraine. The route is approximately 193 km long. Its national number in Hungary is 4. Formerly, it began in Nyíregyháza as its southern part was called E77.

== Route and E-road junctions ==
The E 573 routes through two European countries:

- Hungary (on shared signage 4, except for a 23 km M3 to 403 shared signage bypass of Nyíregyháza)
  - Püspökladány: E60
  - Debrecen: E79
  - Záhony (near Ukrainian border)
- Ukraine (on shared signage M 06)
  - Chop (near Hungarian border)
  - Uzhhorod: ( E50)
