= Andornaktálya =

- Village (község)
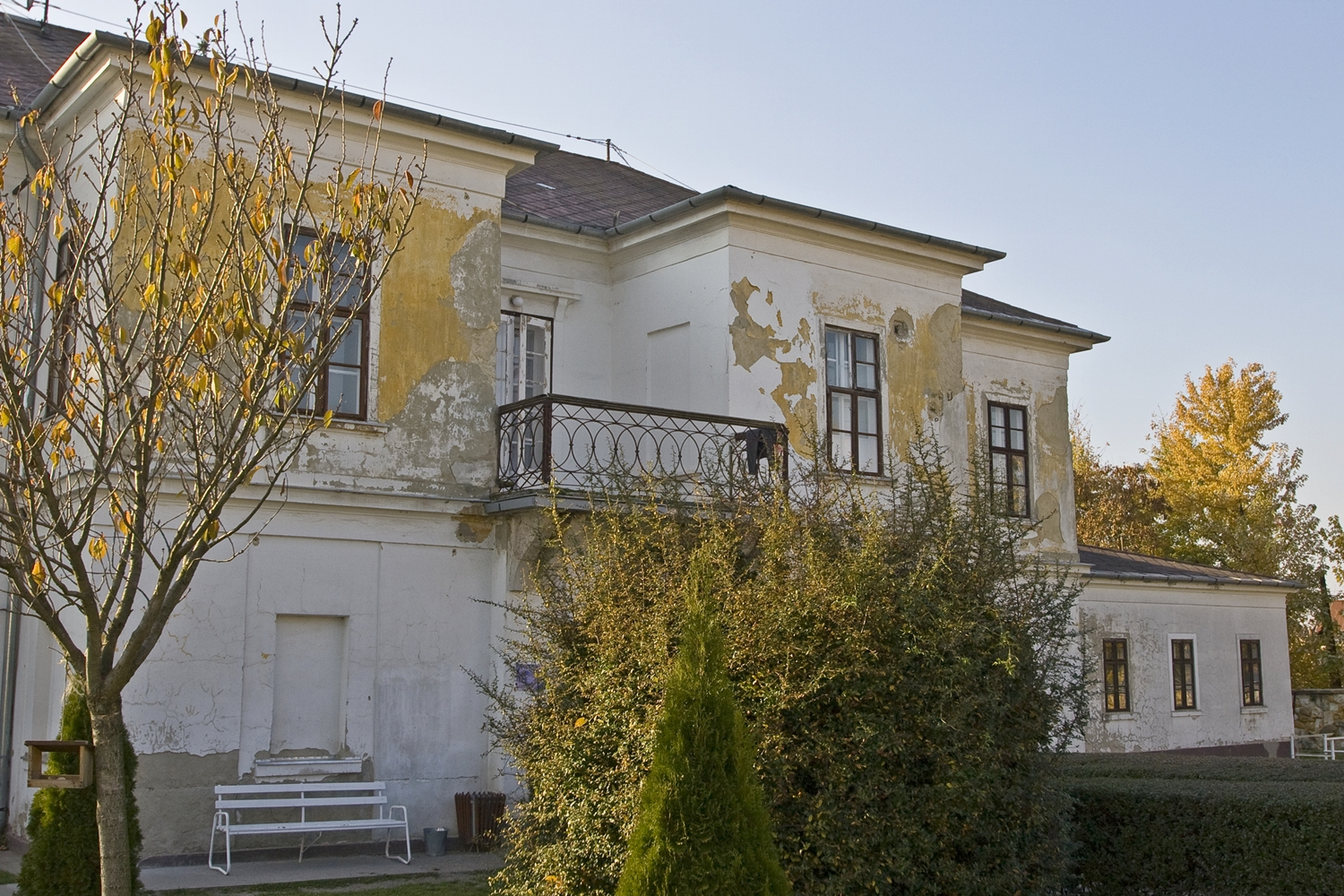

- Coat of arms

- Location of Heves County in Hungary

- Location of Andornaktálya in Hungary
- Coordinates: 47°50′40″N 20°24′42″E
- Country: Hungary
- Region: Northern Hungary
- County: Heves County
- Subregion: Eger District

Government
  - Mayor: László Vámosi

Area
  - Total: 16.75 km^{2} (6.47 sq mi)

Population (1 Jan. 2015)
  - Total: 2,604
  - Density: 156.12/km^{2} (404.3/sq mi)
- Time zone: UTC+1 (CET)
  - Summer (DST): UTC+2 (CEST)
- Postal code: 3399
- Area code: 36
- Website: www.andornaktalya.hu

Andornaktálya is a village in Heves County, Northern Hungary Region, Hungary.
