= Nyírmada =

- Flag Coat of arms

- Location of Nyírmada in Hungary
- Coordinates: 48.0667°N 22.1882°E
- Country: Hungary
- Region: Northern Great Plain
- County: Szabolcs-Szatmár-Bereg
- Rank: City

Area
  - Total: 38.82 km^{2} (14.99 sq mi)

Population (1 January 2009)
  - Total: 4,886
  - Density: 125.9/km^{2} (326.0/sq mi)
- Time zone: UTC+1 (CET)
  - Summer (DST): UTC+2 (CEST)
- Postal code: 4564
- Area code: +36 45
- KSH code: 12274
- Website: https://www.nyirmada.hu/

Nyírmada is a town in Szabolcs-Szatmár-Bereg County, Hungary.

== History ==
=== The jewish community ===
Jews began to settle in Nyírmada in the middle of the 19th century. There was a Jewish-owned flour mill and factories for soda, liquor, vinegar, soap and chemicals.

The Jewish community began to function in 1860, and at the time of the rift in Hungarian Jewry at the Congress of Hungarian Jews (1869,1868) it joined the Orthodox stream.

There was a burial society that cared for the sick, an elementary school, a "Talmud Torah" and a yeshiva. And operated mikveh, rabbi and shochat.

A fire that broke out in the city in 1892 burned down the synagogue building and the school building. A few years later the buildings were rebuilt.

The Jews of Nyírmada were integrated into the social and cultural life of the town and during the World War I many members of the community enlisted in the army, 17 of whom killed in battle.

The status and rights of Hungarian Jews were restricted even before the outbreak of World War II, when the pro-German Hungarian government enacted "Jewish laws" in 1938.

In March 1944, with the entry of the German army into Hungary, the local Jews were ordered to wear yellow badge and on 19 April 1944, the Jews were concentrated in the buildings of the "beit midrash" and the synagogue and their homes were confiscated. At the end of April, they were transported to the Kisvárda ghetto, and a month later were sent to the Birkenau extermination camp near Auschwitz. The youngest of them were transferred to the Dachau concentration camp in Germany.

After the war, 40 survivors returned to Nyírmada. They renewed community life, but over the years abandoned the place, and by 1957 Jews no longer lived in the city.
