= Vásárosnamény =

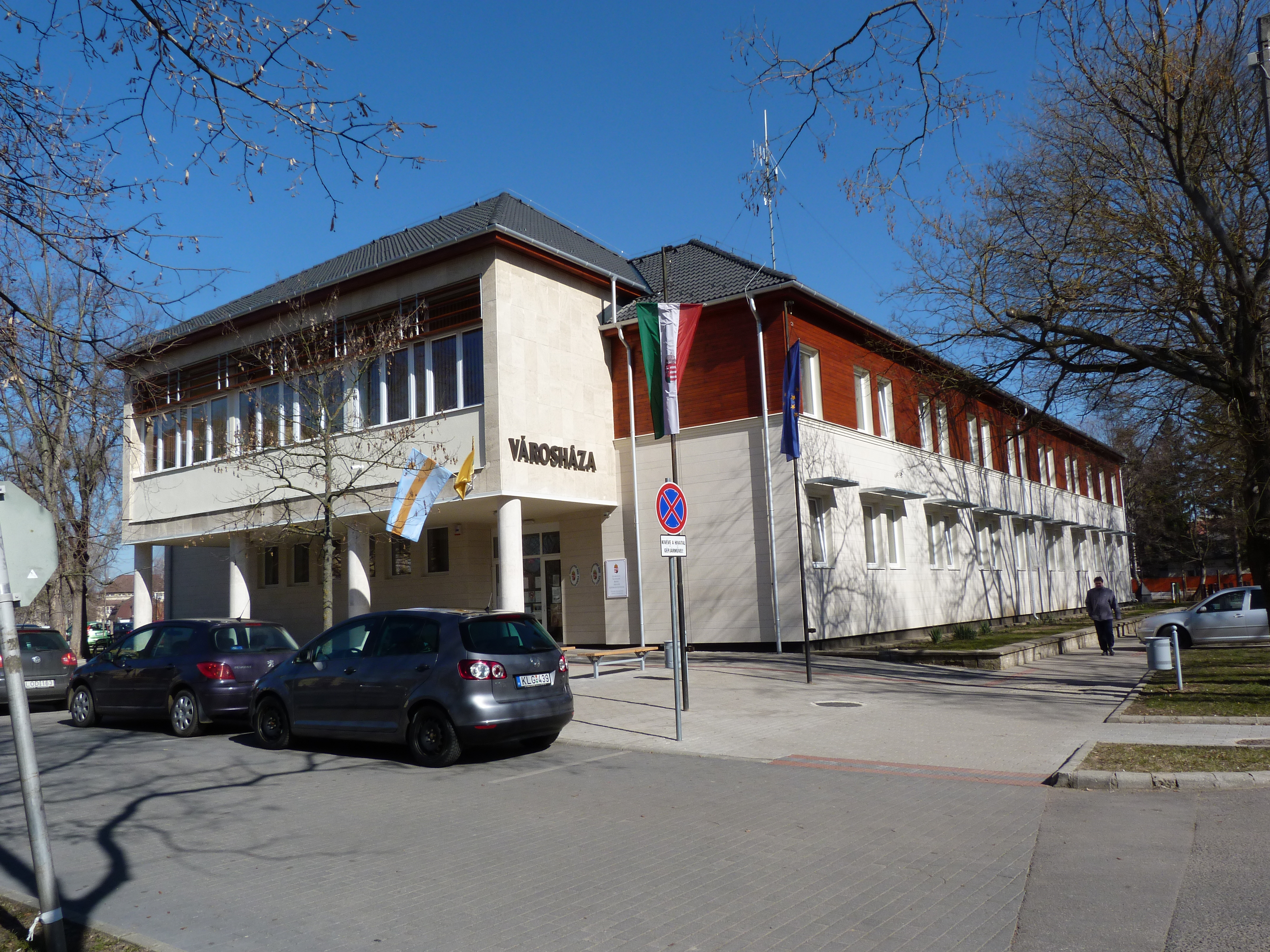
- Town hall of Vásárosnamény

- Flag Coat of arms

- Location within Szabolcs-Szatmár-Bereg County Location within Hungary
- Coordinates: 48°7′36″N 22°19′6″E
- Country: Hungary
- Region: Northern Great Plain
- County: Szabolcs-Szatmár-Bereg
- District: Vásárosnamény

Area
  - Total: 65.66 km^{2} (25.35 sq mi)

Population (2001)
  - Total: 9,325
  - Density: 142/km^{2} (370/sq mi)
- Time zone: UTC+1 (CET)
  - Summer (DST): UTC+2 (CEST)
- Postal code: 4800, 4802–4804
- Area code: 45
- Website: https://vasarosnameny.hu/

Vásárosnamény is a small town in Szabolcs-Szatmár-Bereg county, in the Northern Great Plain region of eastern Hungary. It also includes Vitka since 1969, and in 1939 Gergelyi and Ugornya formed by uniting Gergelyiugornya.

== Postal history ==
Prior to the breakup of Hungary at the end of World War I, the town was in Bereg county. The Post office was established in 1836. The postmaster began using a straight line postmark in 1839. In 1848, the post office began using the standard Hungarian double circle postmark.

== Notable people ==
- Tibor Kapu, astronaut
