= Vaja =

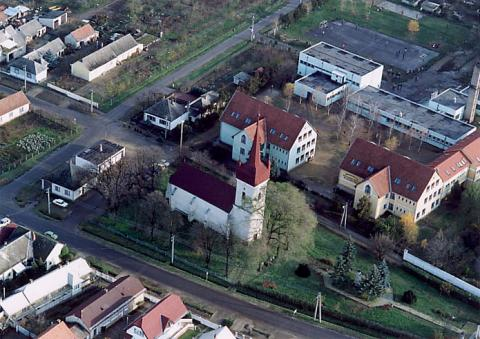
- Aerial view

- Flag Coat of arms

- Location of Vaja in Hungary
- Coordinates: 47.9994°N 22.1711°E
- Country: Hungary
- Region: Northern Great Plain
- County: Szabolcs-Szatmár-Bereg

Area
  - Total: 28.61 km^{2} (11.05 sq mi)

Population (2015)
  - Total: 3,515
  - Density: 122.9/km^{2} (318.2/sq mi)
- Time zone: UTC+1 (CET)
  - Summer (DST): UTC+2 (CEST)
- Postal code: 4562
- Area code: +36 44
- Website: http://vaja.hu/

Vaja is a town in Szabolcs-Szatmár-Bereg county, in the Northern Great Plain region of eastern Hungary.

== Geography ==
It covers an area of 28.61 km^{2} (11 sq mi) and has a population of 3515 people (2015).
