= List of E-roads in Hungary =

European routes in Hungary
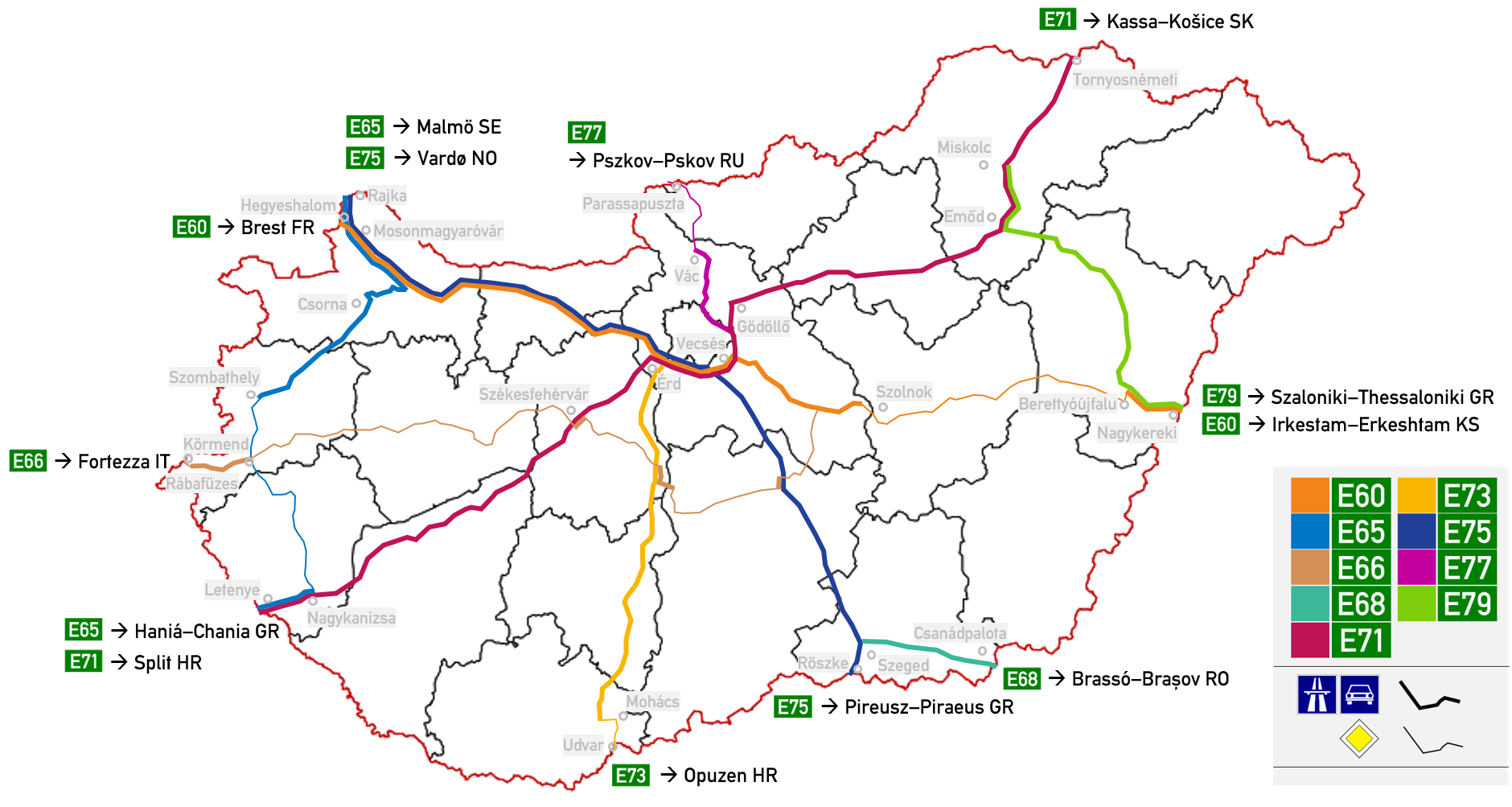

System information
- Maintained by Magyar Közút Nonprofit Zrt. MKIF Magyar Koncessziós Infrastruktúra Fejlesztő Zrt. Duna-Intertoll Zrt. AKA Zrt.
- Length: 2,485 km (1,544 mi)

Highway names
- European routes: European route E nn (E nn)

System links
- Roads in Hungary; Highways; Main roads; Local roads

This is a list of the European Routes, or E-road highways, that run through the Hungary. The current network is signposted according to the 2016 system revision, and contains seven Class A roads and three Class B roads within the country.

Most of the roads are highways (motorways and expressways) that also carry various national M-numbers (e.g. M1-es autópálya and M25-ös autóút), and there are several main roads with numbers (e.g. 6-os főút).

== List of European routes ==
E-road marker on Hungarian road sign

=== Class-A ===
| Number | Length | Northern or western terminus | Southern or eastern terminus | Route |
|---|---|---|---|---|
| E60 | 422 km (262 mi) | Austrian border near Hegyeshalom | Romanian border near Nagykereki | M1: Hegyeshalom - Biatorbágy; M0: Budapest bypass M4: Üllő - Törökszentmiklós; 4: Törökszentmiklós - Berettyóújfalu; 47: Berettyóújfalu; M4: Berettyóújfalu - Nagykereki |
| E65 | 274 km (170 mi) | Slovak border near Rajka | Croatian border near Letenye | M15: Rajka - Levél; M1: Levél - Mosonmagyaróvár; 86: Mosonmagyaróvár - Csorna; M86: Csorna - Szombathely; 86: Szombathely - Nádasd; 76: Nádasd - Zalaegerszeg; 74: Zalaegerszeg - Nagykanizsa; M7: Nagykanizsa - Letenye |
| E66 | 355 km (221 mi) | Austrian border near Rábafüzes (Szentgotthárd) | Main road 4 in Cegléd | M80: Rábafüzes (Szentgotthárd) - Körmend; 86: M80 expressway - Main road 8; 8: Körmend - Székesfehérvár; M7: Székefehérvár bypass 62: Székesfehérvár - Dunaújváros; M6: Dunaújváros - M8 motorway M8: M6 motorway - Dunavecse; 51: Dunavecse - Solt; 52: Solt - Kecskemét; 5: Kecskemét; 441: Kecskemét - Cegléd |
| E68 | 58 km (36 mi) | M5 motorway near Szeged | Romanian border near Csanádpalota | M43: Szeged - Csanádpalota |
| E71 | 532 km (331 mi) | Slovak border near Tornyosnémeti | Croatian border near Letenye | M30: Tornyosnémeti - Mezőcsát; M3: Mezőcsát - Gödöllő; M31: Gödöllő - Nagytarcsa; M0: Budapest bypass M7: Törökbálint - Letenye |
| E73 | 194 km (121 mi) | M0 expressway junction near Nagytétény (Budapest) | Croatian border near Udvar | M6: Nagytétény (Budapest) - Babarc; 57: Babarcs - Mohács; 56: Mohács - Udvar |
| E75 | 360 km (220 mi) | Slovak border near Rajka | Serbian border near Röszke | M15: Rajka - Levél; M1: Levél - Biatorbágy; M0: Budapest bypass M5: Gyál - Röszke |
| E77 | 78 km (48 mi) | Slovak border near Parassapuszta (Hont) | M31 motorway junction near Nagytarcsa | 2: Parassapuszta (Hont) - Vác; M2: Vác - Budapest; M0: Budapest bypass |
| E79 | 223 km (139 mi) | Slovak border near Tornyosnémeti | Romanian border near Nagykereki | M30: Tornyosnémeti - Mezőcsát; M3: Mezőcsát - Görbeháza; M35: Görbeháza - Berettyóújfalu; M4: Berettyóújfalu - Nagykereki |

Class-A European routes

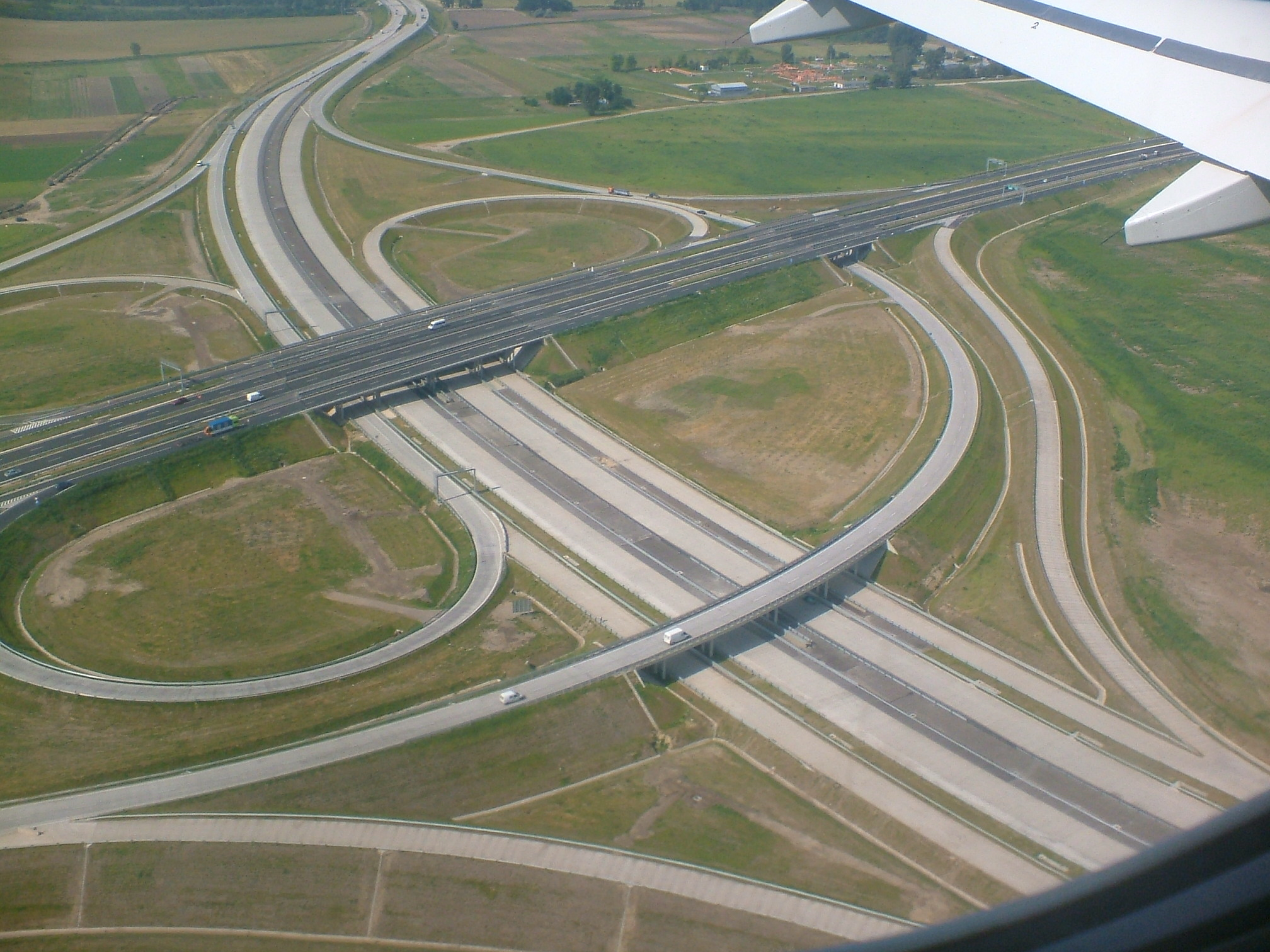
E 60 and E 71 interchange in bypass of Budapest

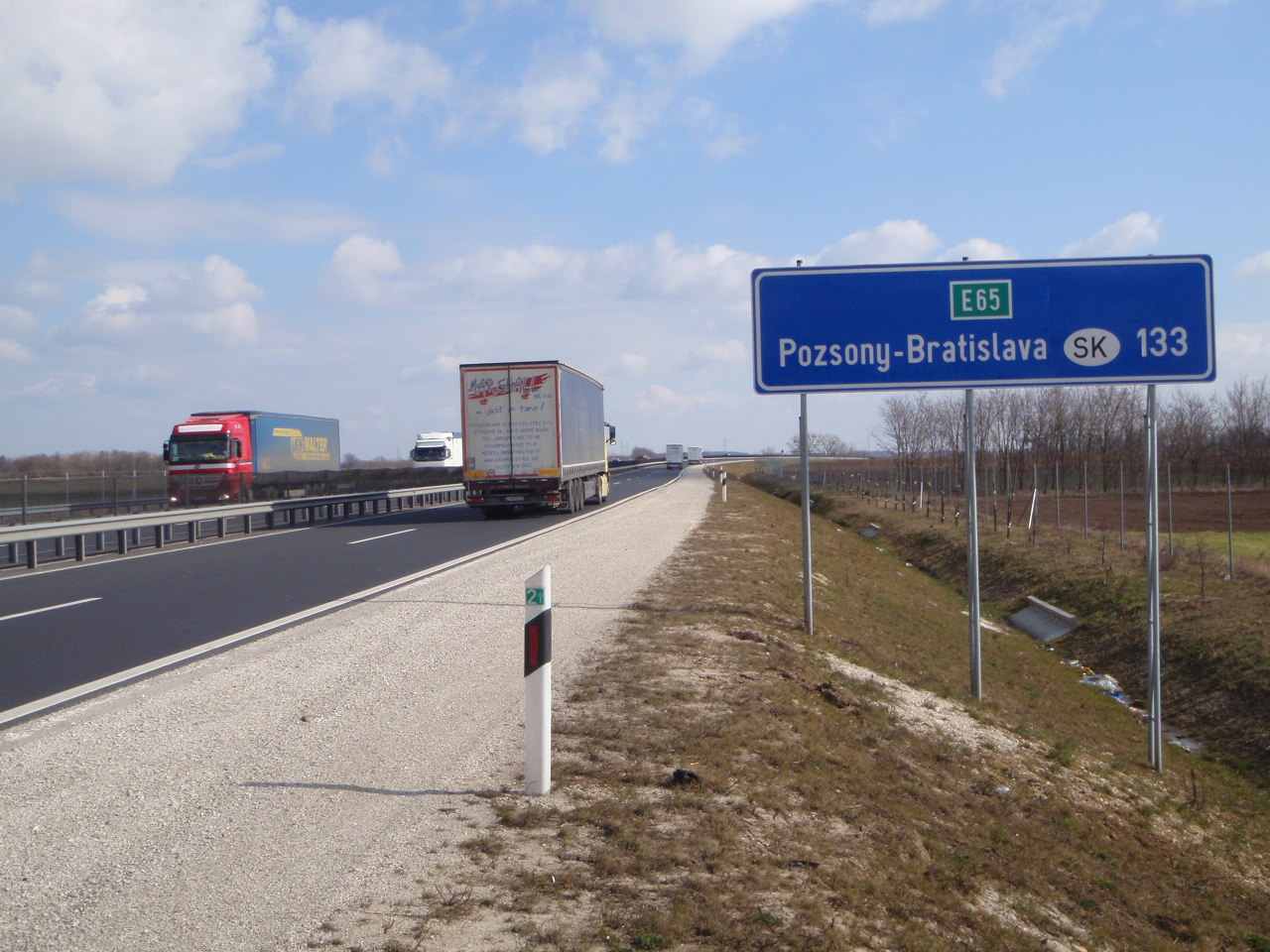
E 65 in Szombathely

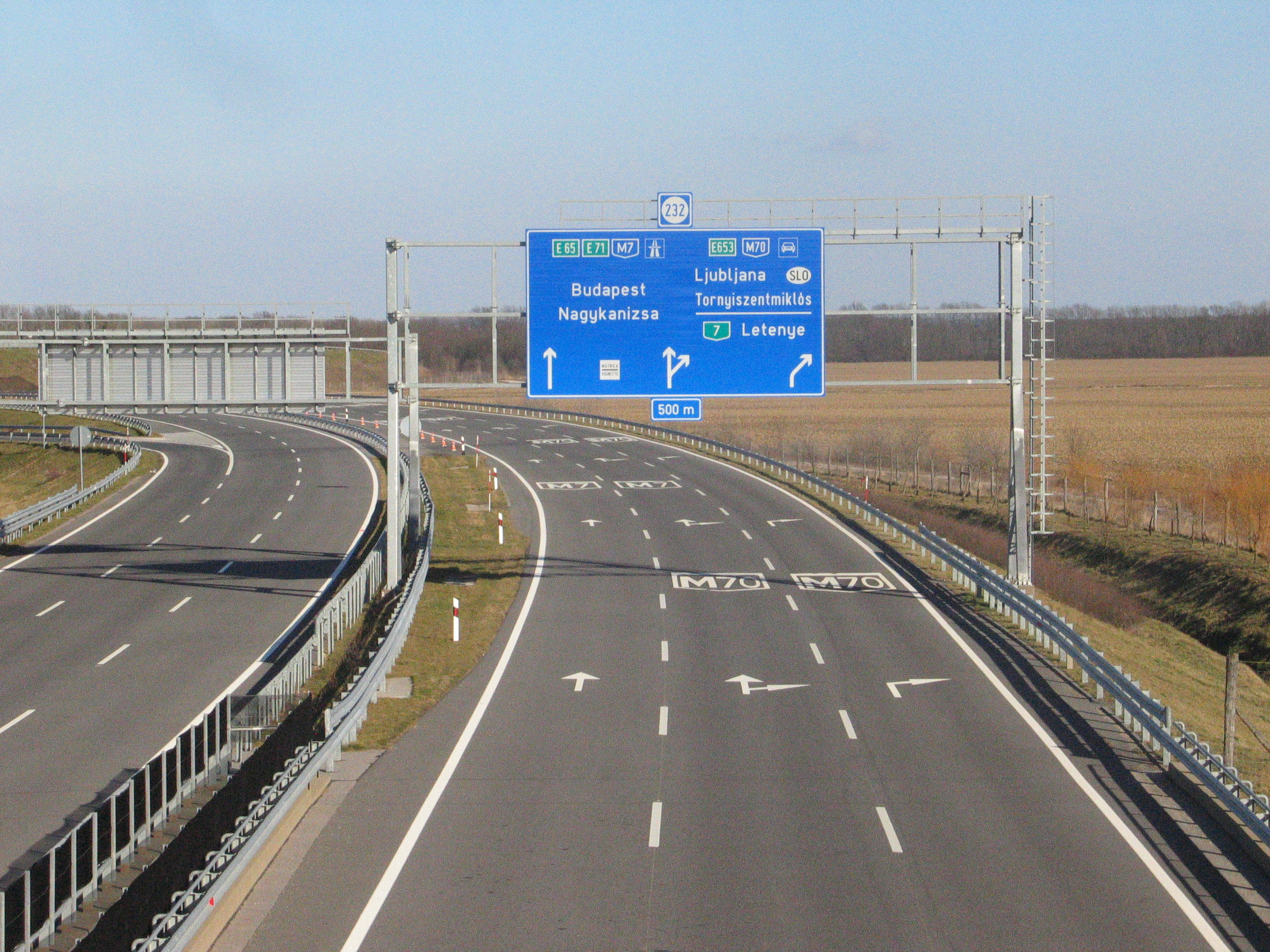
E 71 and E 653 at the Letenye interchange

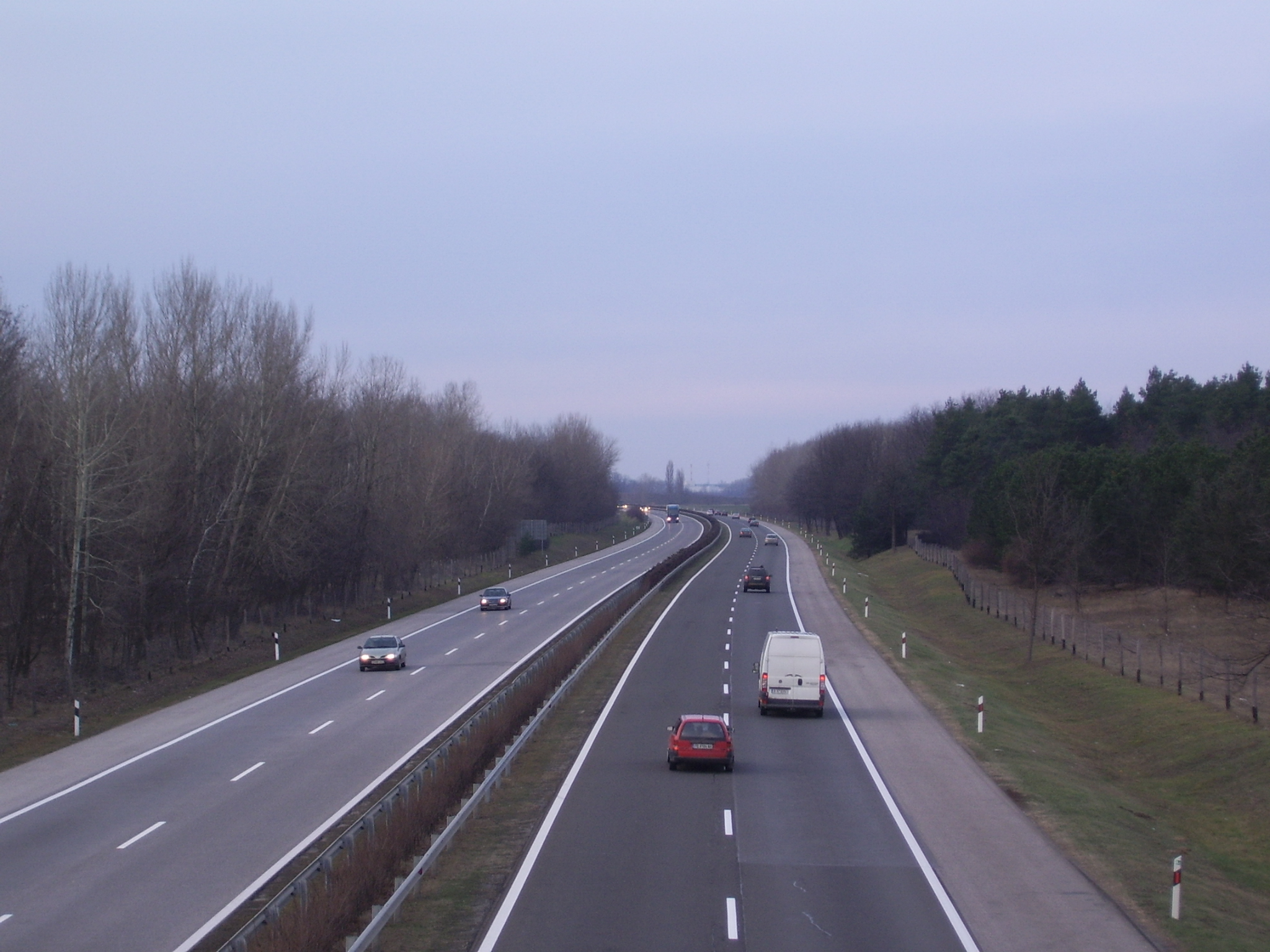
E 75 near Hernád

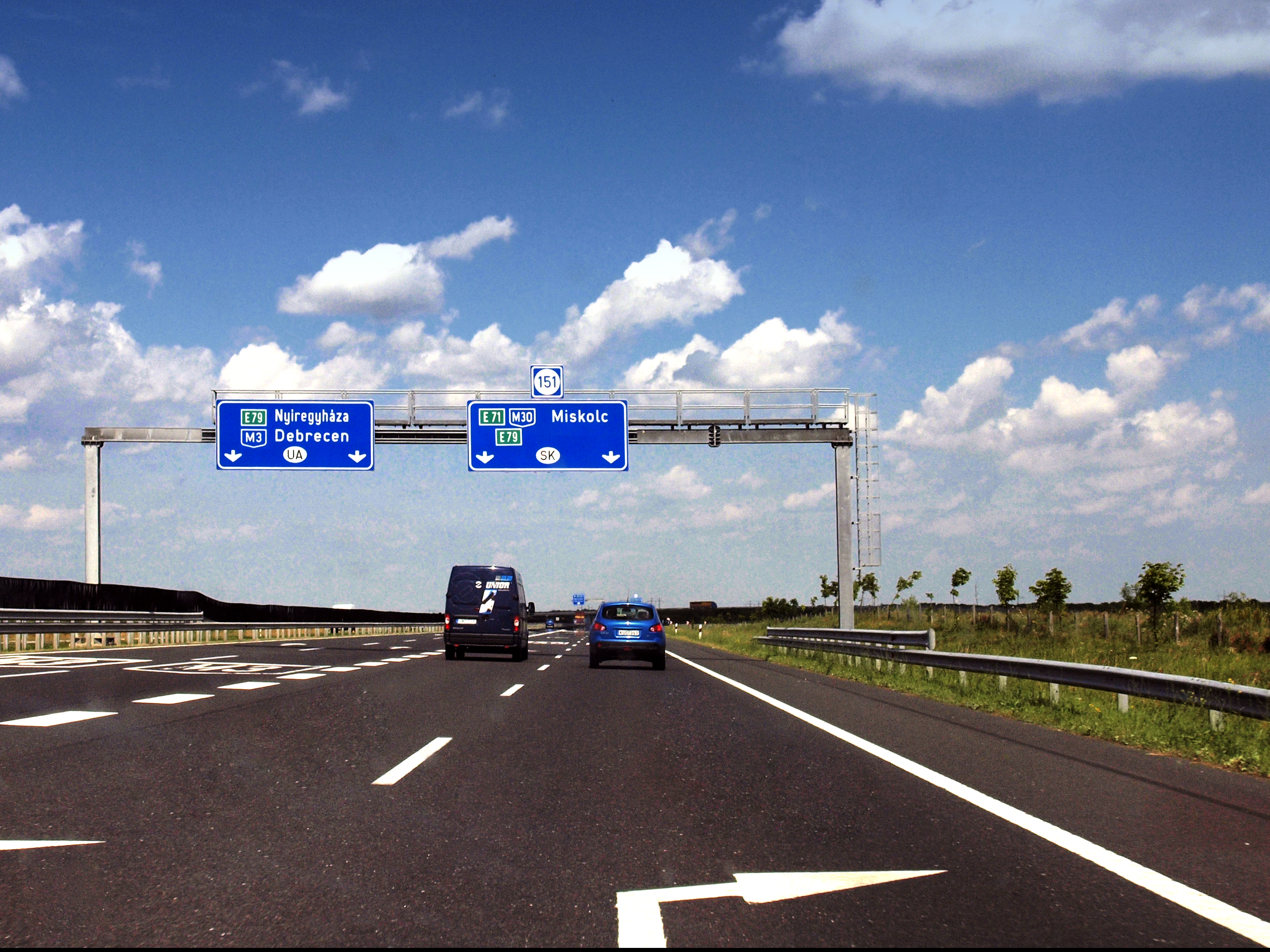
E 79 and E 71 at the Mezőcsát interchange

=== Class-B ===
| Number | Length | Northern or western terminus | Southern or eastern terminus | Route |
|---|---|---|---|---|
| E573 | 170 km (110 mi) | Ukrainian border near Záhony | Main road 4 near Püspökladány | 4: Záhony - Nyíregyháza; 403 and M3: Nyíregyháza bypass 4: Nyíregyháza - Hajdúhadház; 354 and M35: Debrecen bypass 4: Debrecen - Püspökladány |
| E575 | 14 km (8.7 mi) | Slovak border near Vámosszabadi | Main road 1 in Győr | 14: Vámosszabadi - Győr |
| E579 | 121 km (75 mi) | M35 motorway junction near Görbeháza | Ukrainian border near Beregdaróc | M3: Görbeháza - Nyírmada; 41: Nyírmada - Beregdaróc |
| E653 | 21 km (13 mi) | Slovenian border near Tornyiszentmiklós | M7 motorway junction near Letenye | M70: Tornyiszentmiklós - Letenye |
| E661 | 96 km (60 mi) | M7 motorway junction near Balatonkeresztúr | Croatian border near Barcs | 68: Balatonkeresztúr - Barcs; 6: Barcs |

Class-B European routes

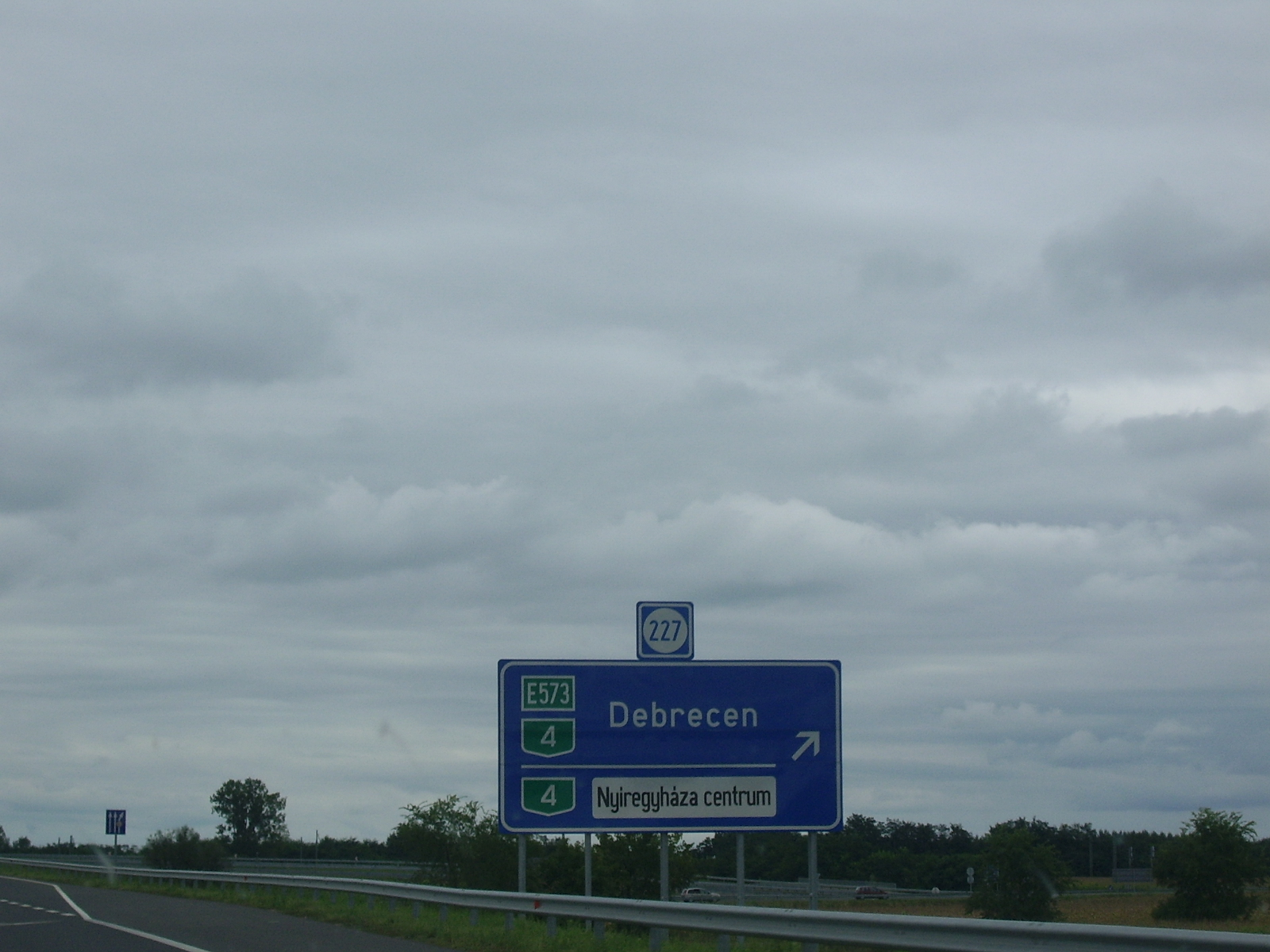
E 573 in southern bypass Nyíregyháza

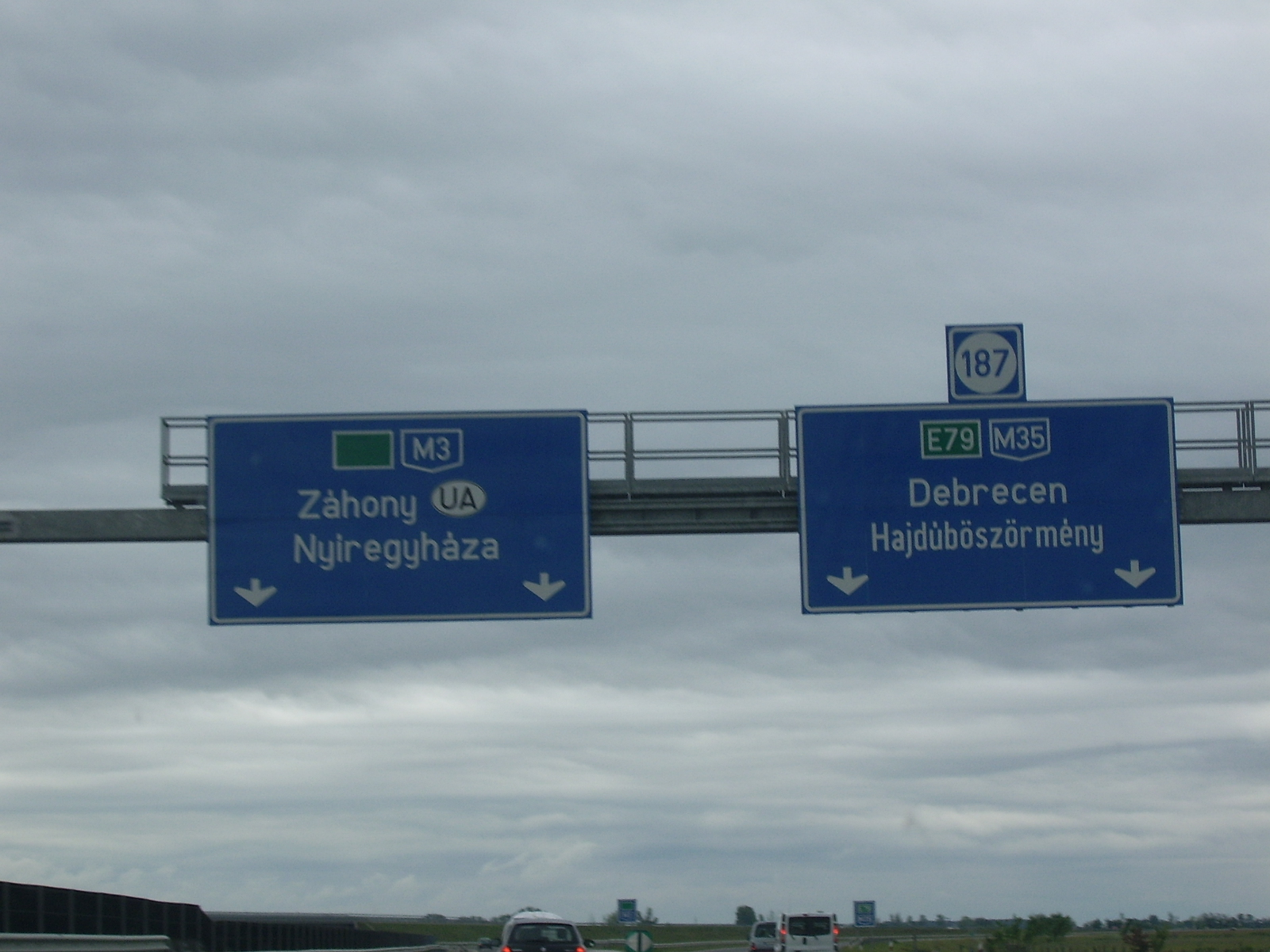
E 579 and E 79 at the Görbeháza interchange

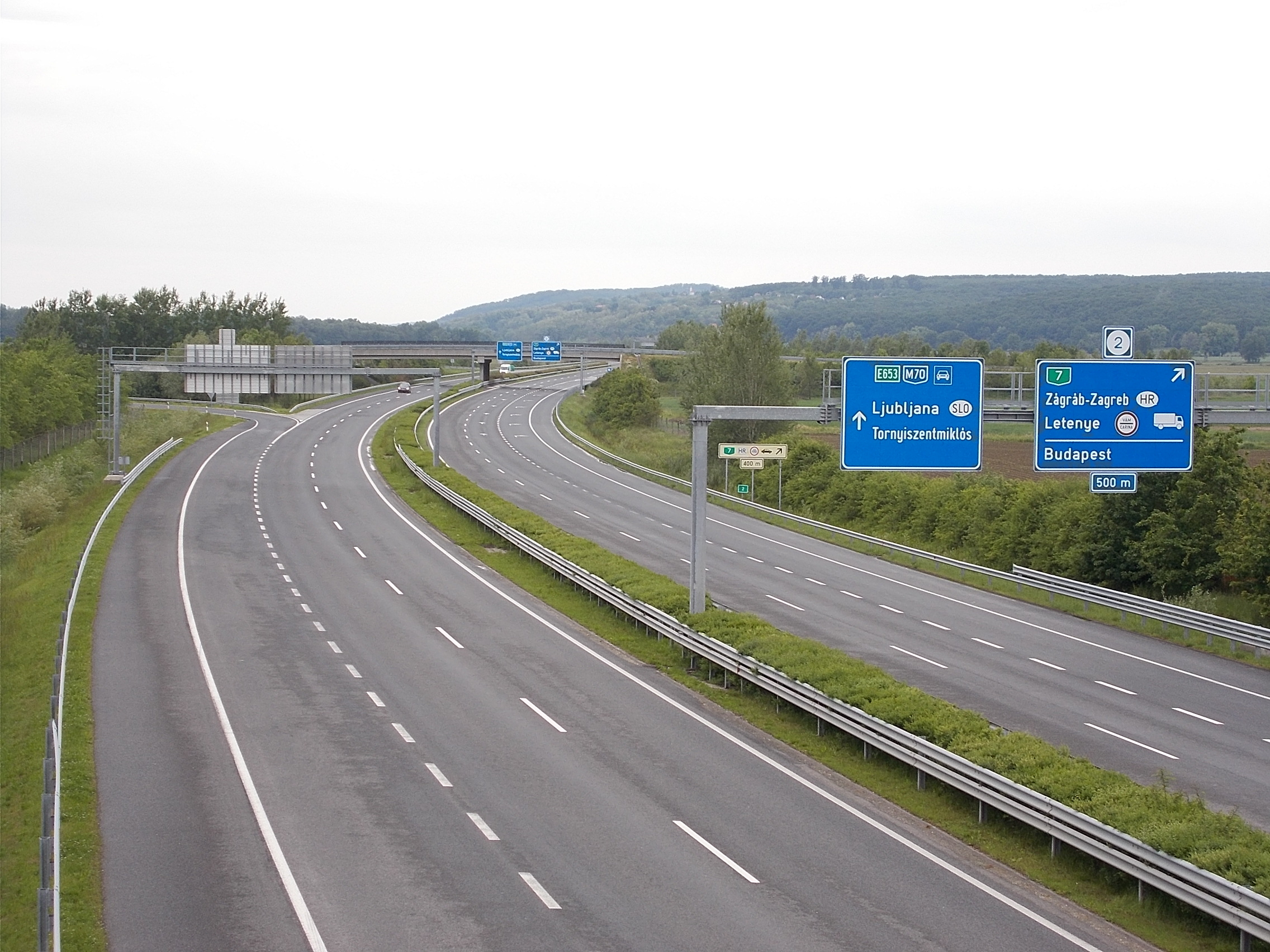
E 653 on the Letenye

== See also ==
- Highways in Hungary
- Roads in Hungary
