= Highways in Hungary =

Numbered system of roads in Hungary

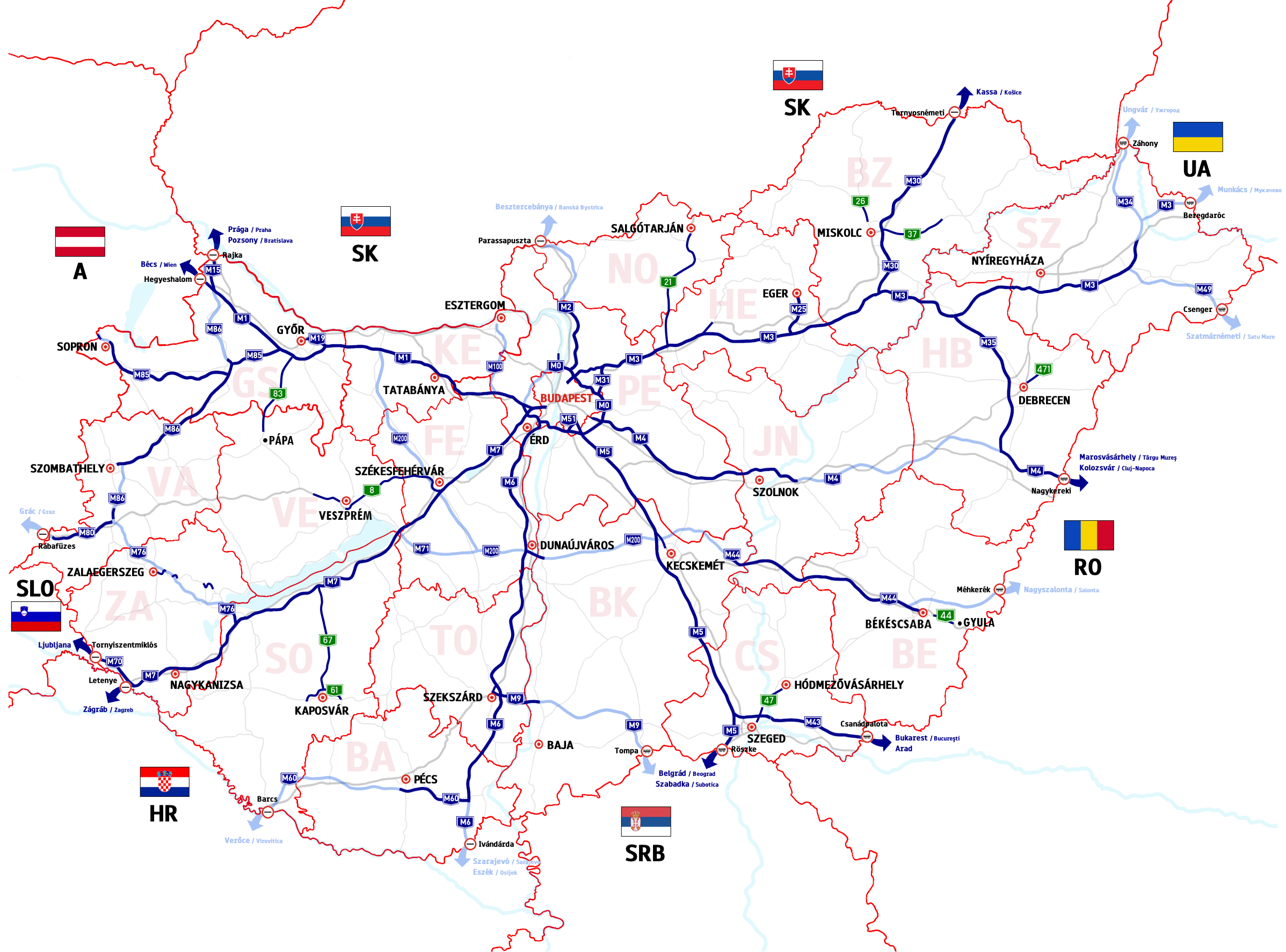
Highways in Hungary in January 2024. Dark blue lines depict sections in use, turquoise lines show sections under construction or proposed highways.

Controlled-access highways in Hungary are dual carriageways, grade separated with controlled-access, designed for high speeds. The legislation amendments define two types of highways: motorways (Hungarian: autópálya) and expressways (Hungarian: autóút).

The main differences are that motorways feature emergency lanes and the maximum allowed speed limit is 130 km/h (81 mph), while expressways may be built without them and the speed limit is 110 km/h (68 mph).

According to Magyar Közút Nonprofit Zrt. (Hungarian Public Roads Ltd.; a state-owned enterprise responsible for the operation and maintenance of public roads in the country), the total length of the Hungarian highway system was 1,855 kilometers in 2022. The construction of the Hungarian highway system started in 1964 with M7, which connected Budapest with Lake Balaton by 1975. The total length of the system reached a milestone of 200 km in 1980, surpassed 500 km in 1998 and 1000 km in 2007.

As of July 2022, the Hungarian highway network comprises 26 highways (13 motorways and 13 expressways), 13 of which (M1, M5, M6, M7, M15, M19, M25, M30, M31, M35, M43, M51 and M70) have reached their total planned length.

== Road categories ==
Motorway sign, autópálya

Expressway sign, autóút

Road signs are white shield on blue and the abbreviation for both types of highways is M. There are 2 main categories of state-owned roads in Hungary: motorways (autópálya – pl. autópályák) and highways (autóút – pl. autóutak).

=== Motorways (Autópálya) ===
- Motorways are public roads with controlled access which are designated for motor vehicles only, and feature two carriageways with at least two continuous lanes each with paved emergency lanes, divided by a median. They have no one-level intersections with any roads or other forms of land and water transport. They are equipped with roadside rest areas, which are intended only for the users of the motorway.

=== Expressways (Autóút) ===
- Expressways are public roads with limited-access which share most of the characteristics of motorways, differing mainly in that:
1. Expressways may be built without paved emergency lanes.
2. Expressway may occasionally have at-grade junctions with roads and other forms of transport.
3. Expressways are designated for lower speed than motorways. For example, the road curvature can be higher and the lanes are usually narrower (3.25/3.50m vs 3.50/3.75 m on Motorways).
4. Expressways can have a single carriageway on sections with low traffic density.

=== Speed limits ===
Maximum speed (km/h)
Vehicle	Motorways	Expressways
Private car, motorbike, van up to 3.5 t (does not apply if towing trailer)	130	110
Bus meeting additional technical requirements	100	80
Truck or van over 3.5 t, bus; Vehicle signed as carrying e.g. dangerous, fragile articles; Car, motorbike, van or bus towing trailer	80	70
Not allowed on motorways: pedestrians, bikes, mopeds, agricultural vehicles. Minimal speed on motorways is 60 km/h unless there are any extraordinary circumstances (e.g., snow, ice, or a car broken down). It is forbidden to stop except extraordinary situations, or travel backwards. Roads are protected from animals crossing the road.

== History ==
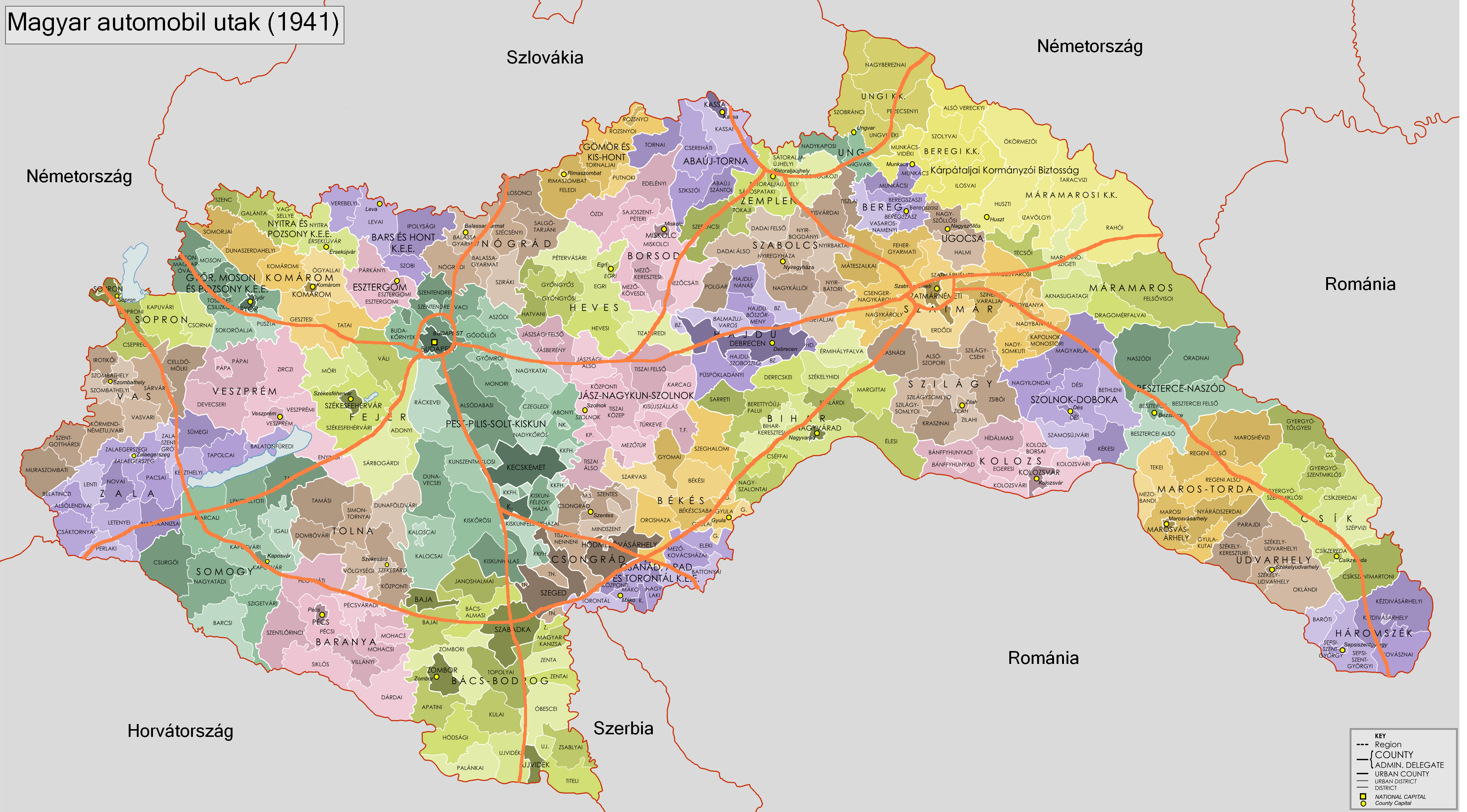
These so-called automobile roads would have stretched along the orange line. This plan was made by Boldizsár Vásárhelyi.

=== First plans for automobile roads ===
The first domestic design for the creation of automobile roads (autómobil utak, autómobil-pályák) was the work of Boldizsár Vásárhelyi, who prepared the first professional concept in 1941 as his doctoral dissertation. It was made in 1941, and in some respects it was more careful than today. Although this draft would not have eliminated the radial structure starting from Budapest, it would have emphasized the highway in places where there is no main road.

For example: to the east between Main roads 3 and 4 as the crow flies towards Debrecen, to the south between Highway 5 and the Danube straight towards Újvidék and Belgrade, to Zagreb further south from Highway 7, thus avoiding Lake Balaton further away, Tab and in the area of Marcali, and also towards Vienna by straightening Main road 1 towards the southern bypass of Tata. The project envisaged the construction of 2,000 km of automobile roads on the then twice the national area, essentially including today's outer ring. Out of all of these, only the relocation of the Main road 1 was realized: then the motorway being built followed the route of the relocated main road here as well.

At the beginning of the 1960s, the development of Highway 80, which was later developed into the M1 motorway, into a highway began specifically as a reconstruction work. At the same time, there were sharp professional discussions about the plans for the M7, which was to be built for the first time in the section between the capital and Székesfehérvár: the position that a large city like Székesfehérvár cannot be bypassed by the highway gained significant emphasis. In this case, the delay in construction had the beneficial effect of allowing the views to improve. A similar type of debate took place a decade later about the avoidance of Győr – here only the northern or southern avoidance was at stake – where time also helped to finally build a more modern network solution.

=== From the late of 1960s ===
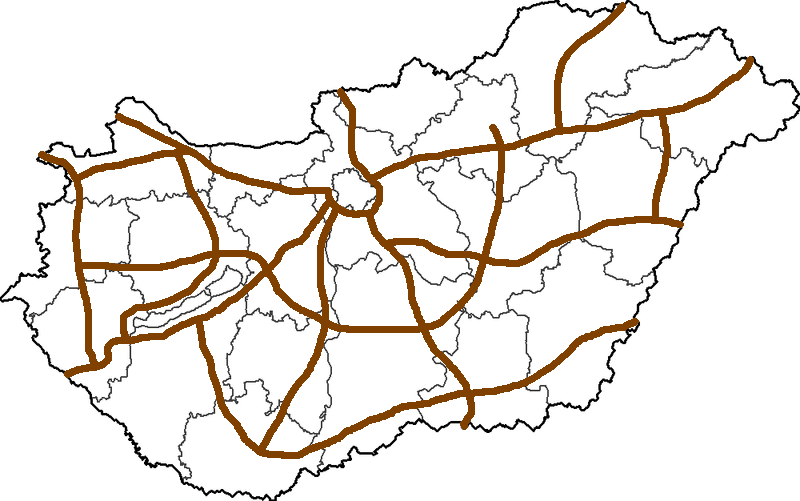
Plans in 1970s.

The 1968 transport policy concept considered the eight single-digit main roads as the backbone of road traffic. However, following the settlement network development concept of 1971, an official highway network concept emerged, which, in addition to the eight radial main roads and the complementary Sopron and north Balaton roads, contained important ring elements: the southern and eastern sectors of the Budapest Ring, a Győr–Veszprém–Székesfehérvár–Dunaföldvár–Kecskemét–Szolnok–Eger "inner" ring, and some elements from an "outer" ring, Sopron–Szombathely–Nagykanizsa, Balatonlelle–Kaposvár–Pécs–Baja–Szeged–Békéscsaba–Gyula, and Berettyóújfalu–Debrecen–Nyíregyháza sections. Within this, the concept envisaged the construction of roads 1, 3, 5, and 7 as Highways. A total of 500 kilometers of highways were expected to be built by 1985. However, the rigid way of thinking of the concept makers of the era left the spatial structure of Hungary unchanged in essential points: the outlined highway network is centered on Budapest, and the roads cross the major rivers (e.g. Danube and Tisza) exactly where bridges already stood at the time the plan was prepared.

In essence, the above was confirmed by the fact that in 1978, the transformation of the radial structure of the main road network into a ring-radial system was already included as a directive in the new transport policy concept. This concept accepts the raison d'être of routes bypassing Budapest, but even this plan only gives space to transversal routes by maintaining the centrality of the capital.

=== After the fall of communism ===
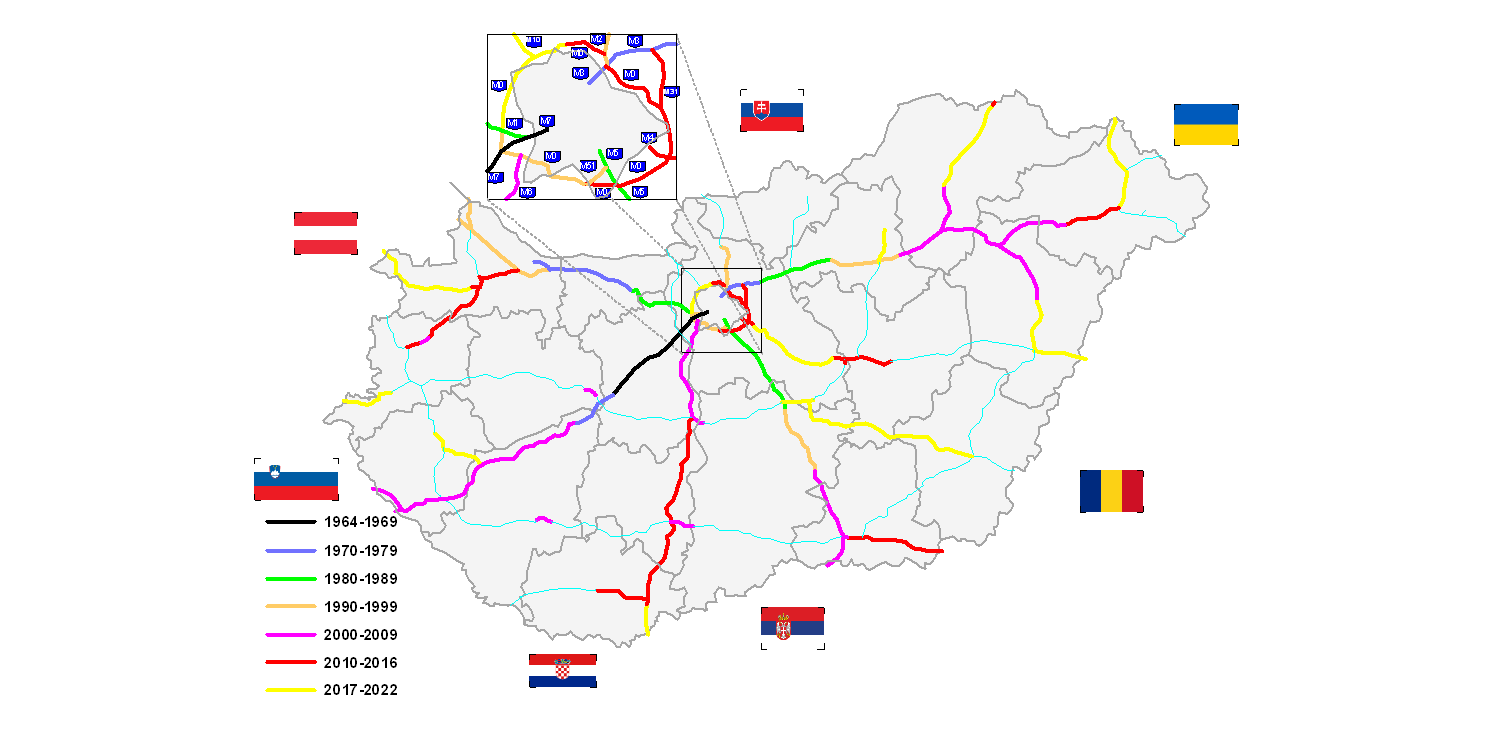
The development of the Hungarian highway network between 1964 and 2022.

In 1988, the need to create European-standard connections to the north–south and east–west transit traffic flow directions already appeared among the priority tasks. This is also reflected in the maturing changes in the international situation, the logical consequence of which in the high-speed network is the adoption of an opening grid structure. The National Road Network Development Program for the years 1991–2000, adopted in 1991, supported the development of radial and transverse roads, but did not consider the southern highway (Déli autópálya), which is increasingly emerging thanks to the activities of lobbyists, to be feasible.

In terms of national borders, the M1 motorway was the first to reach the Austrian border in 1996, followed by the M15 at the Slovak border in 1998, and the M70 motorway reaching the Slovenian border in 2005. In March 2006, the M5 reached the Serbian border. With the completion of the Zrínyi Miklós Bridge over the Mura at the Croatian border, the M7 motorway also joined the neighboring country's motorway system in 2008. In 2015 and 2020, the M43 motorway and M4 stretched to the Romanian border. The year 2025 also brought new connections to neighbouring countries, as the last section of the M80 expressway was opened in september, after the austrian side finally inaugurated their corresponding expressway. The M6 motorway also reached the croatian border being inaugurated in October 2025, after the building on the croatian side was delayed. In the future, the M3, M34, M60, M8, M85, M87 motorways may also reach the Hungarian border.

Plans were made to connect Szombathely with an expressway from 1995, and then its implementation took 10 years from 2006 to 2016. The construction was carried out in 9 stages and cost 158 billion forints, with 85% support from the European Union. The bypass section of the city of Csorna, handed over in 2015, became a unique solution in domestic road construction, as it was the first construction of an interweaving and diverging expressway, with the intersection of two roads in different directions. The merging and distribution of the M85 and M86 expressways into a common route was achieved with a 3.5 km expressway with a 2×3 lane track, while two railway lines are crossed together with an overpass.

From the 2020s

== Highway system ==
The following is a list of all existing, under construction and/or planned highways in Hungary.

Sign	Class	Map	Route	Total length	Existing		Years of construction
Sign	Class	Map	Route	Total length	(km)	%	Years of construction
M0	Limited-access road		Budapest Ring (Budapesti körgyűrű); Biatorbágy (M1) – Törökbálint (M7) – Bp., Budafok-Tétény (M6) – Dunaharaszti (M51) – Gyál (M5) – Vecsés (M4) – Nagytarcsa (M31) – Bp., Újpalota (M3) – Bp., Újpest (M2) – Budakalász – Üröm – Budakeszi – Biatorbágy; Planned section: Budakalász – Biatorbágy (M1)	109 km (68 mi)	76.82	71%	1988 –
M1	Motorway		Budapest – Budaörs (M7) – Biatorbágy (M0) – Bicske – Tatabánya – Komárom – Győr (M19, M85) – Mosonmagyaróvár – Levél (M15) – Hegyeshalom / border with Austria (motorway A 4)	160.16 km (99.52 mi)	160.16	100%	1964–1996
M2	Limited-access road		Budapest (M0) – Dunakeszi (M1) – Vác – Rétság – Hont (Parassapuszta) / border with Slovakia; Planned section: Vác – Rétság – Hont (Parassapuszta) / border with Slovakia (expressway R3)	70 km (43 mi)	30.73	44%	1996 –
M3	Motorway		Budapest – Gödöllő (M31) – Hatvan – Gyöngyös – Füzesabony (M25) – Mezőcsát (M30) – Polgár – Görbeháza (M35) – Nyíregyháza – Vaja (M49) – Vásárosnamény – Beregdaróc / border with Ukraine; Planned section: Vásárosnamény – Beregdaróc / border with Ukraine	297 km (185 mi)	280	94%	1978 –
M4	Limited-access road Motorway		Budapest – Üllő (M0) – Cegléd – Szolnok – Törökszentmiklós – Karcag – Püspökladány – Berettyóújfalu – Nagykereki / border with Romania (motorway A 3); Under construction section: Törökszentmiklós – Kisújszállás; Planned section: Kisújszállás – Berettyóújfalu	222.48 km (138.24 mi)	128.76	58%	2005 –
M5	Motorway		Budapest – Gyál (M0) – Lajosmizse – Kecskemét (M44) – Kiskunfélegyháza – Szeged (M43) – Röszke / border with Serbia (motorway A1)	160.92 km (99.99 mi)	160.92	100%	1985–2006
M6	Motorway		Budapest (M0) – Érd – Dunaújváros (M8) – Paks – Szekszárd – Bóly (M60) – Ivándárda / border with Croatia (motorway A5)	212.13 km (131.81 mi)	212.13	100%	2006 – 2024
M7	Motorway		Budapest – Budaörs (M1) – Érd (M0) – Székesfehérvár – Siófok – Balatonboglár – Balatonkeresztúr – Hollád (M76) – Nagykanizsa – Letenye / border with Croatia (motorway A4)	226.52 km (140.75 mi)	226.52	100%	1964–2008
M8	/		Balatonfőkajár (M7) – Dunaújváros (M6) – Dunavecse – Kecskemét (M5, M44) – Abony (M4); Planned section: Balatonfőkajár – Dunaújváros, Dunavecse – Abony	approx. 161 km (100 mi)	9.77	6%	2007 –
M9	Limited-access road		Szekszárd (M6) – Dusnok	approx. 61 km (38 mi)	20.48		2003 –
M10			Üröm (M0) – Pilisvörösvár – Dorog (M100)	approx. 34 km (21 mi)	under planning		/
M15	Motorway		Levél (M1) – Rajka / border with Slovakia (motorway D2)	14.74 km (9.16 mi)	14.74	100%	1996–1998; 2018–2019
M19	Limited-access road		Introductory road of Győr (M1 – Main road 1)	9.65 km (6.00 mi)	9.65	100%	1975
M25	Limited-access road		Introductory road of Eger (M3 – Main road 252)	17.41 km (10.82 mi)	17.41	100%	2017–2020
M30	Motorway		Part of Via Carpathia; Mezőcsát (M3) – Miskolc – Szikszó – Encs – Tornyosnémeti / border with Slovakia (expressway R4)	88.54 km (55.02 mi)	88.54	100%	2002–2021
M31	Motorway		Part of the Budapest bypass (M0 – M3)	12.41 km (7.71 mi)	12.41	100%	2009–2010
M32			Abony (M4) – Jászapáti – Füzesabony (M3, M25)	approx. 63 km (39 mi)	under planning		/
M34	Limited-access road		Vásárosnamény (M3) – Záhony / border with Ukraine	approx. 36 km (22 mi)	under planning		/
M35	Motorway		Part of Via Carpathia; Görbeháza (M3) – Hajdúböszörmény – Debrecen – Berettyóújfalu (M4)	67.79 km (42.12 mi)	67.79	100%	2006–2018
M43	Motorway		Szeged (M5) – Makó – Csanádpalota / border with Romania (motorway A 1)	57.72 km (35.87 mi)	57.72	100%	2005–2015
M44	Limited-access road		Kecskemét (M5) – Lakitelek – Kunszentmárton – Szarvas – Békéscsaba – Sarkad / border with Romania; Under construction section: Kecskemét (M5) – Lakitelek; Planned section: Békéscsaba – Sarkad	approx. 168 km (104 mi)	125	74%	2016 –
M49	Limited-access road		Vaja (M3) – Mátészalka – Csenger / border with Romania	45 km (28 mi)	under construction		2023 –
M51	Limited-access road		Part of the old Budapest bypass (M0 – M5)	3.6 km (2.2 mi)	3.6	100%	1988
M60	/		Bóly (M6) – Pécs – Szigetvár – Barcs / border with Croatia; Planned section: Pécs – Barcs / border with Croatia	97 km (60 mi)	32	33%	2007 – 2015
M70	Motorway		Letenye (M7) – Tornyiszentmiklós / border with Slovenia (motorway A5)	21.26 km (13.21 mi)	21.26	100%	2002–2005; 2017–2019
M76	Limited-access road		Hollád (M7) – Sármellék – Zalaegerszeg – Körmend; Planned section: Sármellék – Körmend	approx. 82.3 km (51.1 mi)	8.48	10%	2018 –
M80	Limited-access road		Körmend – Szentgotthárd (Rábafüzes) / border with Austria (expressway S 7)	28.12 km (17.47 mi)	28.12	100%	2018–2021
M81	Limited-access road		Komárom (M1) – Kisbér – Mór – Székesfehérvár – Sárbogárd (M8)	approx. 114 km (71 mi)	under planning		/
M85	Limited-access road		Győr (M1) – Csorna – Kapuvár – Sopron / border with Austria; Planned section: Scarbantia rest stop – border section	95 km (59 mi)	93	98%	2008 – 2024
M86	Limited-access road		Körmend – Szombathely – Répcelak – Csorna (M85) – Mosonmagyaróvár; Planned section: Körmend – Szombathely, Csorna – Mosonmagyaróvár	approx. 115 km (71 mi)	70.96	62%	2008 – 2016
M87	Limited-access road		Szombathely (M86) – Kőszeg / border with Austria; Planned section: Szombathely – Kőszeg	22 km (14 mi)	1	5%	2021 –
M90	Limited-access road		Hollád (M7-M76) – Kaposvár – Szigetvár (M60) + Bóly (M60) – Mohács – Tompa – Szeged (M5/M43)	approx. 90 km (56 mi) + 131 km (81 mi)	under planning		/
M100	Limited-access road		Bicske (M1) – Esztergom / border with Slovakia	approx. 41 km (25 mi)	under planning		/

=== Main highways ===
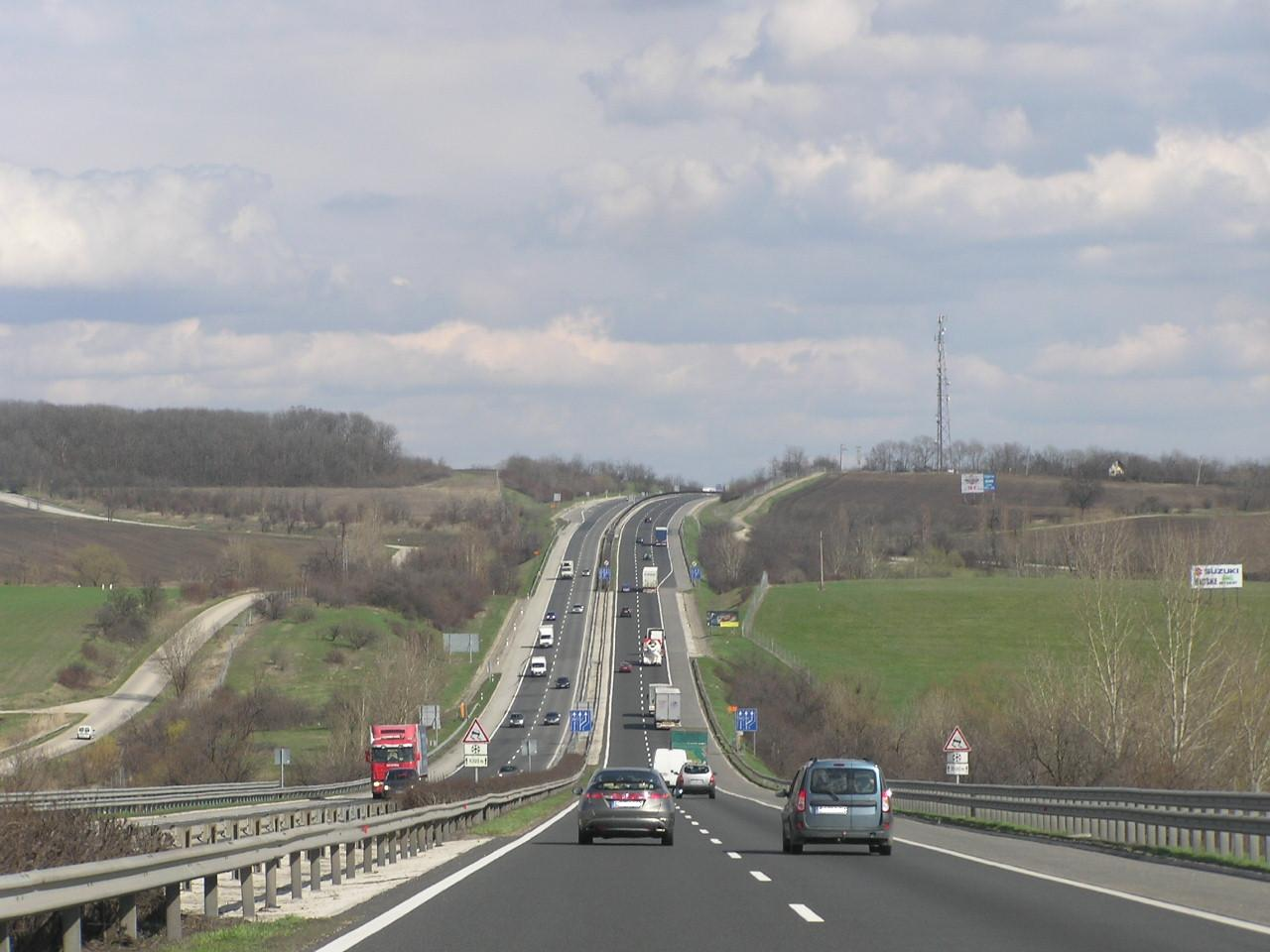
M1 between Budapest and Tatabánya

==== M1 motorway ====
The M1 motorway is one of the oldest motorway of Hungary. It connects the Hungarian capital with the northwester part of Transdanubia, (Tatabánya, Győr) towards to Vienna. The motorway is part of the Pan-European Corridor IV, and European route E60, E65 and E75. Average daily traffic is 75,510 near Budapest and 56,421 vehicles/day near Győr. The construction of the motorway began 1964, it took more than thirty years to reach Hegyeshalom and the Austrian border. Its significance has increased since the change of regime in 1990, and today it is the most important western connection in Hungary.

- M19 expressway is a branch of the M1 motorway. This is an introductory road of Győr and the old part of the M1.
- M15 motorway is a branch of the M1 motorway, connecting it with the border of Slovakia, toward to Bratislava.
- M85 expressway is a branch of the M1 motorway, connecting it with the city of Csorna, toward to Szombathely (M86) or Sopron and the border of Austria.

==== M2 expressway ====
The M2 expressway connects the northern part of Hungary (western part of North Hungarian Mountains), towards to Banská Bystrica and Kraków. The highway is part of the European route E77. This one is an important route of the Hungarian highway and road network, the northern diagonal main line of traffic forming part of Budapest.

==== M3 motorway ====
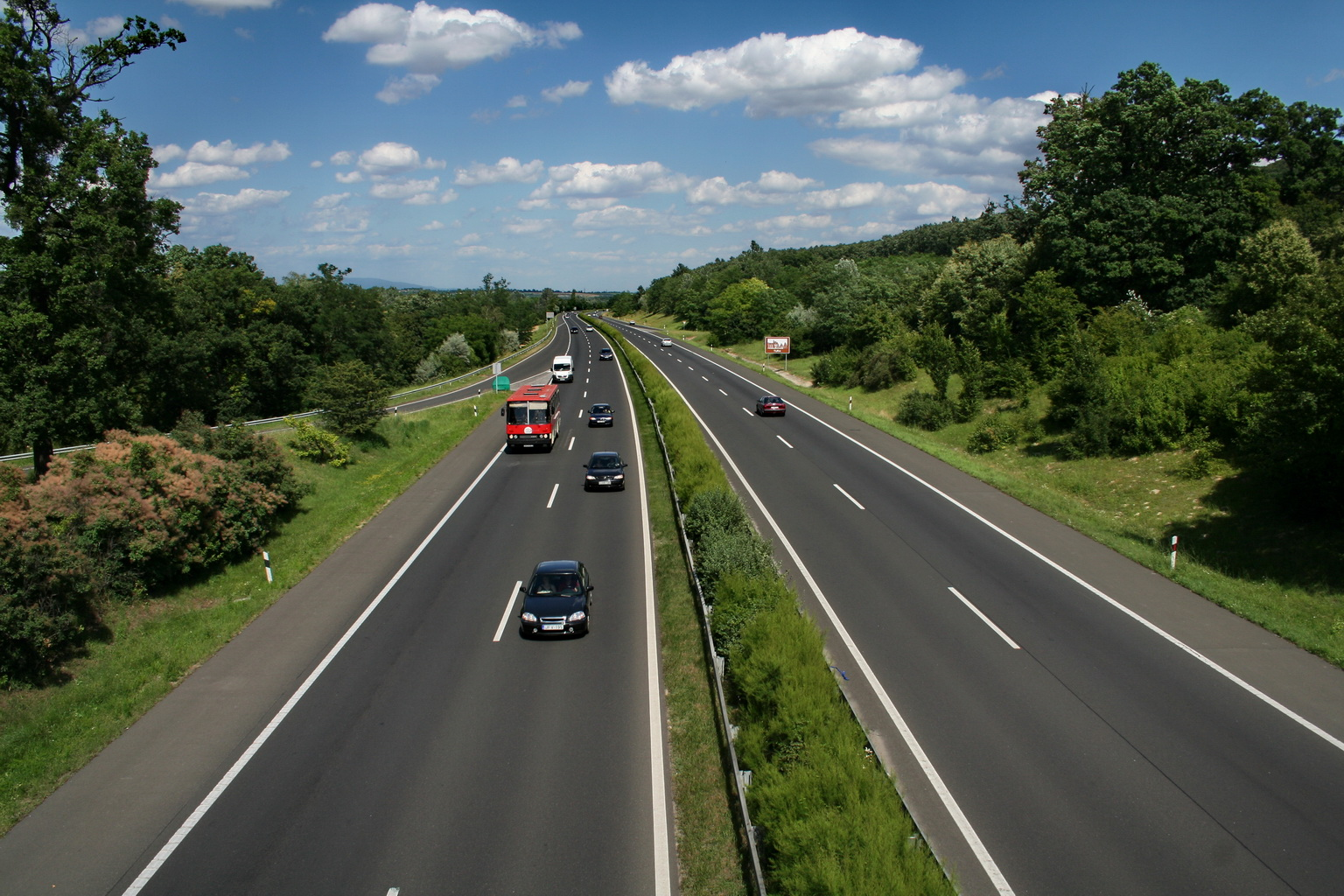
M3 in Kisbag rest area

The M3 motorway is connects the northeaster part of Hungary (North Hungarian Mountains and northeastern part of Great Hungarian Plain), towards to Carpathian Ruthenia. The motorway is part of the Venice-Trieste-Ljubljana-Budapest-Lviv-Kyiv line Central-East Europe Corridor V, and European route E71, E79, E573 and E579. This is one of the most important route of the Hungarian motorway and road network, the southwest–north-eastern diagonal main line of traffic forming part of Budapest. Through Ukraine, Eastern Europe, and through Slovakia, creates a highway connection to the countries of north-eastern Europe.

- M31 motorway is a branch of the M3 motorway. This is an important transit road between the M3 motorway and bypass of Budapest (M0 expressway)
- M25 expressway is a branch of the M3 motorway. This is an introductory road of Eger.
- M30 motorway is another branch of the M3 motorway, connecting it with the city of Miskolc and the border of Slovakia, towards to Košice. This route is fully part of the Via Carpathia.
- M35 motorway is a branch of the M3 motorway, connecting it with the city of Debrecen towards to M4 motorway and Romania. This route is fully part of the Via Carpathia.
- M49 expressway is a future branch of the M3 motorway, connecting it with the city of Mátészalka, and the border of Romania, toward to Satu Mare.

==== M4 expressway/motorway ====
The M4 expressway/motorway is connects the eastern part of Hungary (eastern part of Great Hungarian Plain), towards to Romania (Oradea and Cluj Napoca). The motorway is part of the and European route E60 and E79. Through Romania, M4 creates a highway connection to the countries of eastern Europe.

==== M5 motorway ====
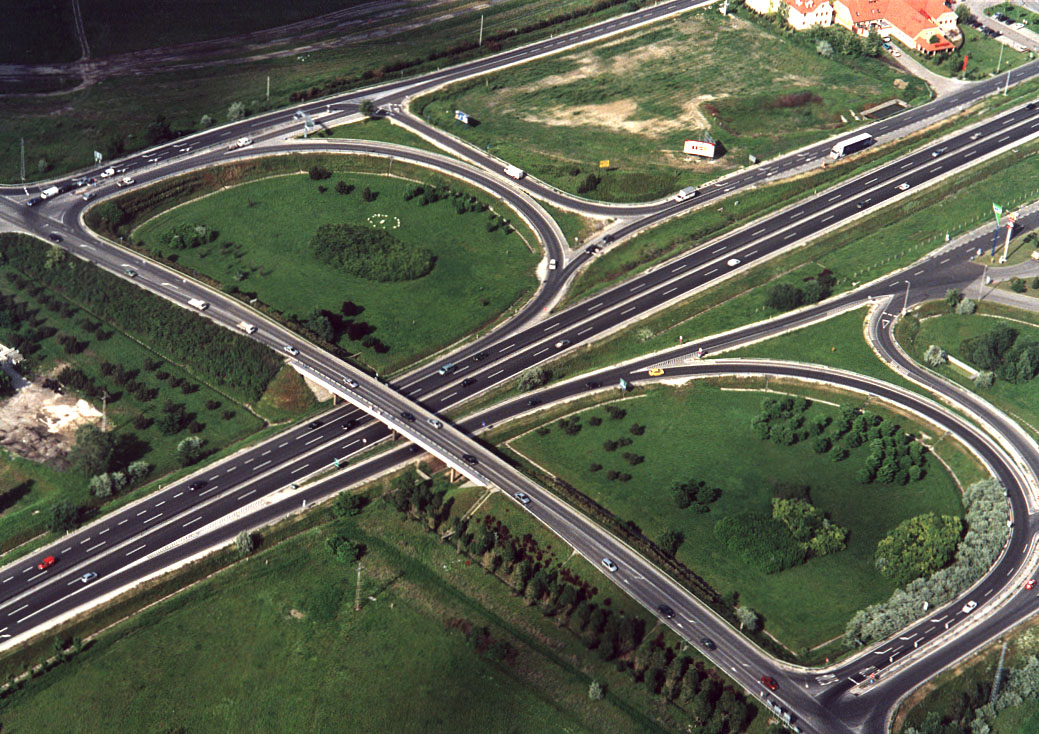
M5 near Lajosmizse

The M5 motorway starts from Budapest, it connects the Hungarian capital with Szeged and southeast part of Hungary, towards Belgrade. It was the third motorway in Hungary that reached the border. The motorway is part of the Pan-European Corridor X, and European route E75. The motorway was built in the 1980s and reached the Serbian border in March 2006.

- M44 expressway is a future branch of the M5 motorway, connecting it with the city of Békéscsaba, and the border of Romania, toward to Salonta.
- M43 motorway is a branch of the M5 motorway, connecting it with the city of Makó and the border of Romania, towards to Arad and Timișoara.

==== M6 motorway ====
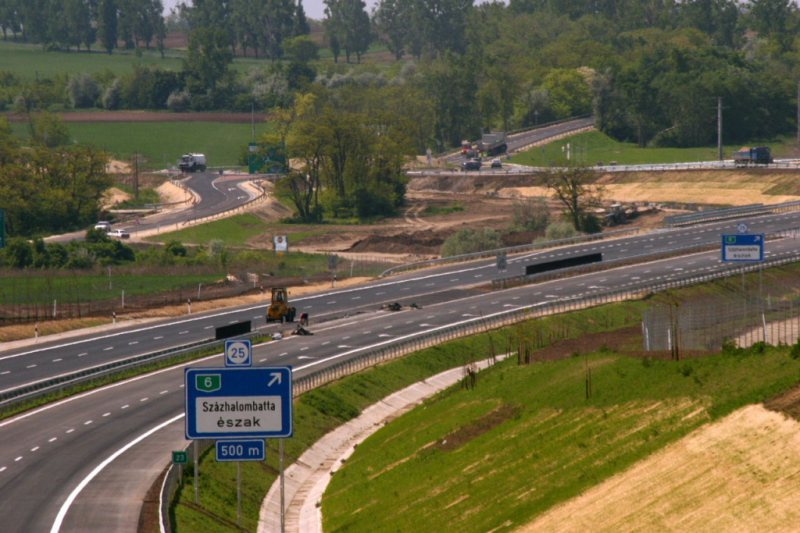
M6 near Százhalombatta

The M6 motorway starts from Budapest (M0-M6 Interchange), it connects the Hungarian capital with Dunaújváros, Szekszárd and Mohács, on the right bank of the Danube, towards Osijek and Sarajevo. The motorway is part of the European route E73. The final section reaching the border is currently under construction with a planned opening date in 2024. The connecting Croatian section is scheduled to be delivered a year earlier.

Main junctions:

- M8 motorway is a branch of the M6 motorway, connecting it with the Dunavecse, this will be the future plan for connecting the city of Veszprém, Dunaújváros, Kecskemét and Szolnok.
- M60 motorway is a branch of the M6 motorway, connecting it with the city of Pécs and the border of Croatia, towards to Zagreb in the future.

==== M7 motorway ====
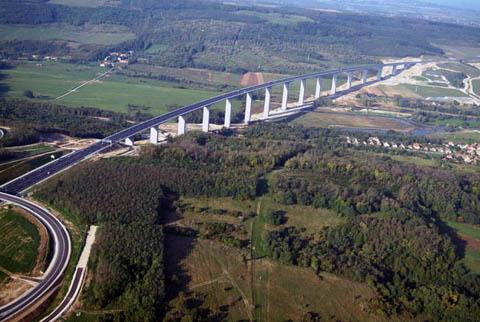
M7 at Köröshegy Viaduct

The M7 motorway starts from Budapest, it connects the Hungarian capital with Lake Balaton and southwestern part of Transdanubia, towards to Zagreb. The motorway is part of the Pan-European Corridor V, and European route E71. Average daily traffic is 62,779 near Budapest and 49,273 vehicles/day near Székesfehérvár. The motorway was built in the 1960s and reached the Croatian border in October 2008.

Main junctions:

- M70 motorway is a branch of the M7 motorway, connecting it with the border of Slovenia, towards to Maribor, Ljuljana and Venice.

== Opening of new highways ==
Construction of new motorways in recent years has been hampered due to corruption scandals and austerity measures as well as owing to new European rules under which old EIA assessments lapsed. In the coming years, the highway network expansion focuses on connecting all major cities into the highway network, and on the completion of highways in the border region of Hungary. Construction of non-radial roads continues to be slow.

Contracted segments with estimated openings:

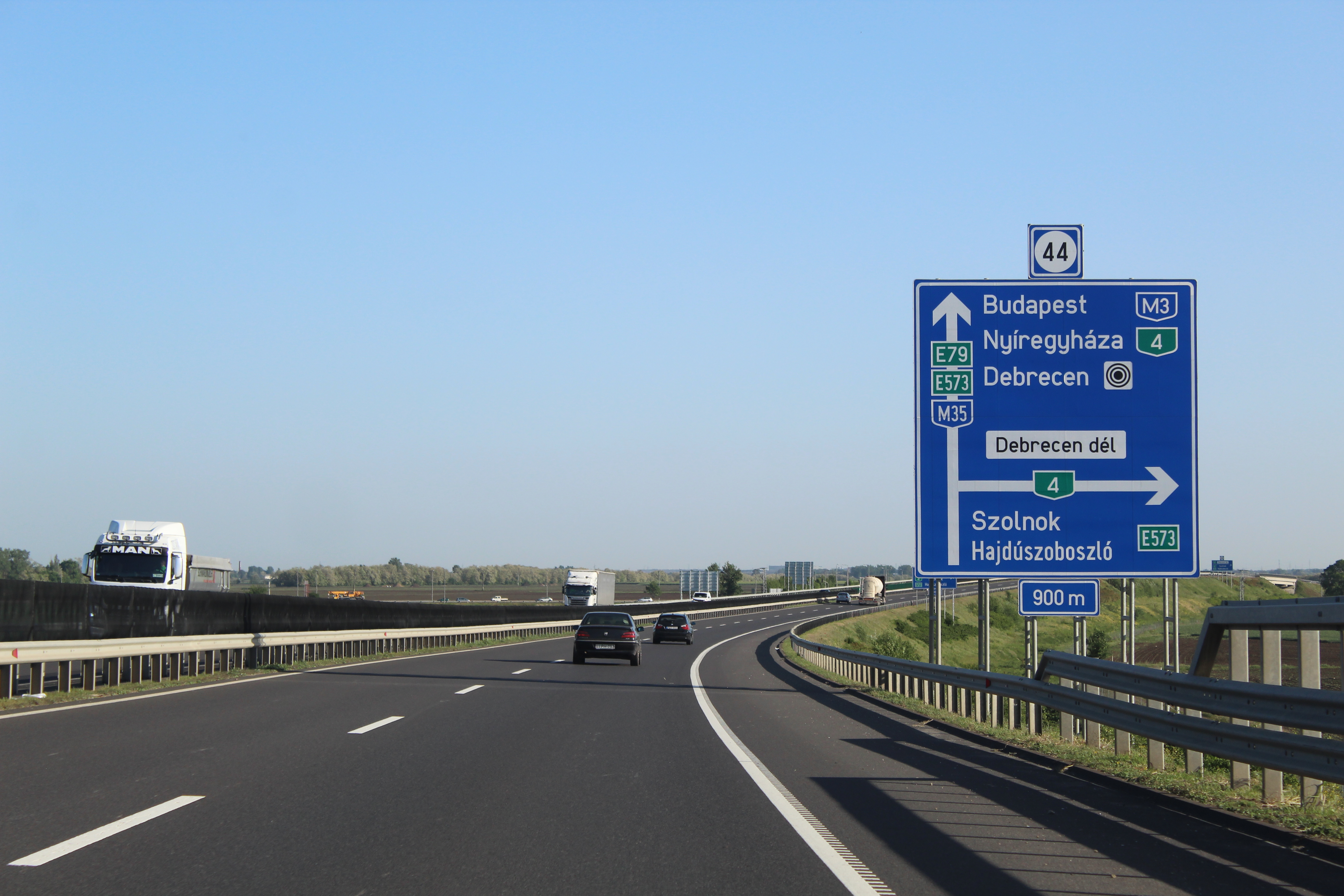
M35 motorway just outside Debrecen

2024

- M6: Bóly (M60 Interchange) – exit Villány (13.9 km) (Q1)
- M85: Sopron Tunnel, section between Sopron-észak – border of Austria (4 km) (Q3)

2025

- M44: Kecskemét-észak (M5 Interchange) – Szentkirály (32.2 km) (Q2)
- M6: exit Villány – border of Croatia, towards to A5 motorway (6 km) (Q3)
- M80: Szentgotthárd – border of Austria, towards to S7 expressway (1.7 km) (Q3)
- M4: Törökszentmiklós-nyugat – Kisújszállás-kelet (34.3 km) (Q4)

2026

- M49: Vaja (M3 Interchange) – Ököritófülpös (28.2 km) (Q3)

== Network size ==
Development of the overall length (at the end of the year)
Year	Length (km)	Year	Length (km)	Year	Length (km)	Year	Length (km)
1965	7	2005	777	2013	1,319	2021	1,845
1970	85	2006	916	2014	1,340	2022	1,875
1975	132	2007	993	2015	1,399	2023	1,875
1980	213	2008	1,069	2016	1,432	2024	1,897
1985	302	2009	1,073	2017	1,442	2025	1,938
1990	347	2010	1,241	2018	1,479	2026	2,001
1995	384	2011	1,279	2019	1,593		
2000	531	2012	1,279	2020	1,745		
IEA-PVPS

Hungarian highways network since 1964

== Toll requirements ==
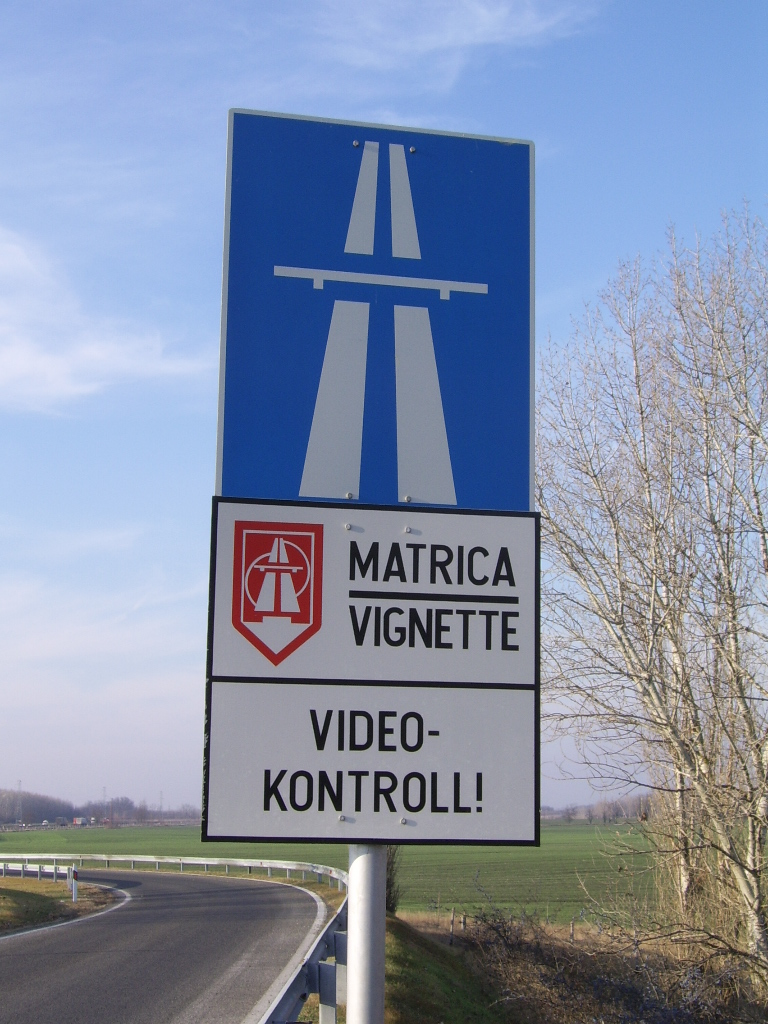
Sign indicating the beginning of a toll road section.

=== Motorcars up to 3.5 tonnes ===
The Hungarian system has 2 main type in terms of salary (for motorcycles, passenger cars, buses, trailers, vans up to 3.5 t):

1. time-based fee vignettes (E-vignette system)
2. regional vignettes (annual vignette for Hungarian counties)

==== Time-based fee vignettes ====
All vehicles must have an electronic vignette to use the motorways and expressways in Hungary. Cars, vans and motorbikes up to 3.5 tonnes only need to buy a single vignette which costs 6,400 Hungarian forint (Ft) for 10 days, 10,360 Ft for 1 month and 57,260 Ft for a year, from 1 January 2024. The e-vignette user charge system applies to motorcycles, passenger cars and their trailers, as well as cargo vehicles with a maximum permissible gross weight of 3.5 tonnes, campers and buses, and their trailers. These vehicles are authorized to use the Hungarian toll speedway network's roads exclusively with pre-purchased –purchased prior to entering a toll speedway section– road use authorization, i.e. electronic vignettes (e-vignettes). The amount of toll charges depends on the category of the vehicle and the type of the e-vignette. The category of the motor vehicles must be determined according to the official entry that appears in the vehicle registration certificate, based on the maximum permissible gross weight of the motor vehicle and the number of persons it is allowed to transport.

Electronic vignettes replaced the windscreen toll vignette (autópálya matrica) in 2008.

A blue motorway or expressway road sign means that a paid e-vignette toll is obligatory unless stated otherwise (usually sections from the border to the closest exit). Only sections not subject to e-vignette are designated with an additional road sign (see below).

All vignettes are checked via ANPR cameras or the police will pull a driver over and the driver will have to show a vignette via the E-vignette app or the driver will print out a sheet with the payment. If failing to buy a e-vignette the driver will face fines from 18,750 Ft to 74,970 Ft.

==== Regional vignettes ====
Valid for the toll expressways of the specific county with annual validity, that is from the time of purchase (from the first day of the current year in case of pre-purchase) until midnight on 31 January of the year following the reference year.

Weekly and monthly vignettes are valid from the time of purchase (the payment taking effect), unless the customer specifies the start of the validity period (starting date) of the e-vignette.

The vignette is valid until the exit after the county border. The table below shows which sections can be used with which county vignettes:

Type of regional vignette	Usable sections	Length (in 2024)
Bács-Kiskun	M5 (53–140 km), M44 (30–36 km)	93 km
Baranya	M6 (163–193 km), M60 (0–30 km)	60 km
Békés	M44 (50–117 km)	67 km
Borsod-Abaúj-Zemplén	M3 (114–175 km), M30 (full part, 88 km)	149 km
Csongrád-Csanád	M5 (114–174 km), M43 (full part, 58 km)	108 km
Fejér	M1 (27–56 km), M6 (25–98 km), M7 (23–90 km)	169 km
Győr-Moson-Sopron	M1 (94–171 km), M15 (full part, 15 km), M19 (full part, 10 km), M85 (full part, 95 km), M86 (116–150 km)	241 km
Hajdú-Bihar	M3 (164–221 km), M4 (210–241 km), M35 (full part, 68 km)	156 km
Heves	M3 (39–128 km), M25 (full part, 19 km)	108 km
Jász-Nagykun-Szolnok	M4 (93–117 km), M44 (30–71 km)	65 km
Komárom-Esztergom	M1 (48–112 km), M19 (0–6 km)	70 km
Pest	M0 (full part, 78 km), M1 (7–39 km), M2 (full part, 17–48 km), M3 (11–55 km), M4 (21–98 km), M5 (14–67 km), M6 (15–34 km), M7 (7–30 km)	357 km
Somogy	M7 (80–191 km), M76 (0–8 km)	119 km
Szabolcs-Szatmár-Bereg	M3 (203–280 km)	77 km
Tolna	M6 (75–173 km)	98 km
Veszprém	M7 (80–98 km)	18 km
Vas	M86 (80–124 km)	44 km
Zala	M7 (183–234 km), M70 (full part, 21 km), M76 (4–8 km)	76 km

A road sign indicating the beginning of the motorway electronic vignette (paid on a specific license plate of a vehicle) duty for cars ≤ 3.5t (placed under the road sign for motorway or expressway)

A road sign indicating that a motorway sections is not subject to electronic vignette. ≤ 3.5t (placed under the road sign for motorway or expressway)

=== Vehicles over 3.5 tonnes ===
Lorries have to buy an e-toll Via E-toll app to use the highways and expressways. There are different fares for lorries below 3.5 tonnes and lorries above 3.5 tonnes.

== Operators ==
The network is managed by 6 operators, of which one is under full government control and other fiveare operated by joint ventures.

Operator	Highway	Length (in 2022)	Notes
MKIF Magyar Koncessziós Infrastruktúra Fejlesztő Zrt.	M1, M7 (from M0 to the border); M3, M4, M8, M15, M30, M35, M44, M70, M85, M86	1,273 km (791 mi)	Under concession until 2057.
Magyar Közút	M1, M5, M7 (from Budapest to M0); M6 (from M0 to Érd); M0, M2, M9, M31, M43, M80	291 km (181 mi)	Ownership by Hungary (100%).
AKA Alföldi Koncessziós Autópálya Zrt.	M5 (from M0 to the border)	156.5 km (97.2 mi)	Ownership by Strabag. Under concession until 2031.
M6 Duna Autópálya Koncessziós Zrt.	M6 (from Érd to Dunaújváros); M8 (from M6 to Kisapostag)	59 km (37 mi)	Ownership by Aberdeen Asset Management, EBRD and Intertoll. Under concession until 2026.
M6 Tolna Autópálya Koncessziós Zrt.	M6 (from Dunaújváros to Tolna)	63 km (39 mi)	Ownership by Aberdeen Asset Management, EBRD and Intertoll. Under concession until 2038.
Mecsek Autópálya Koncessziós Zrt.	M6 (from Tolna to Bóly); M60 (until Pécs)	83 km (52 mi)	Ownership by Strabag, Colas, Bouygues, John Laing Group, Intertoll. Under concession until 2038.

== Main roads with 2x2 traffic lanes ==
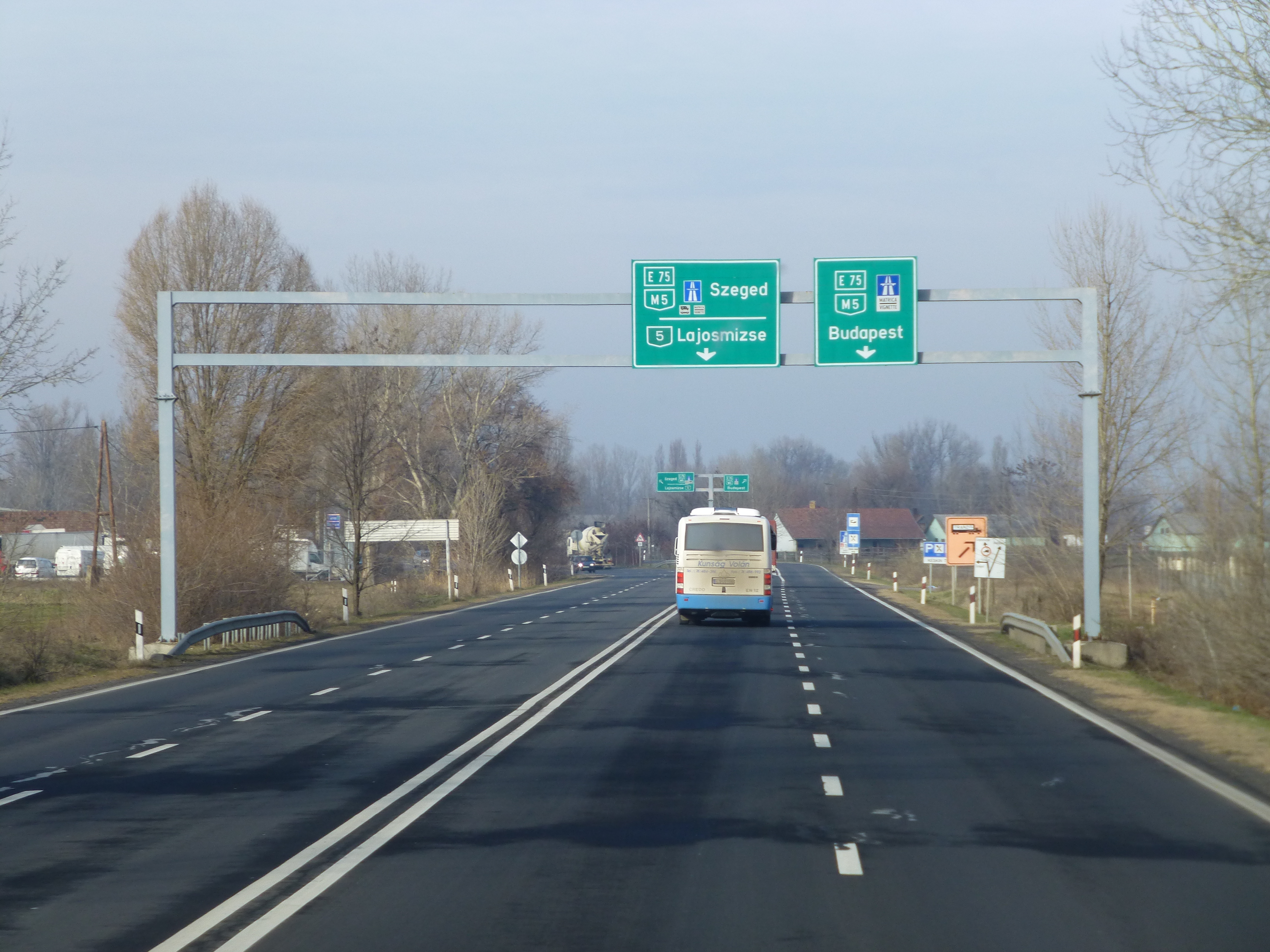
Main road 5 near Kecskemét.

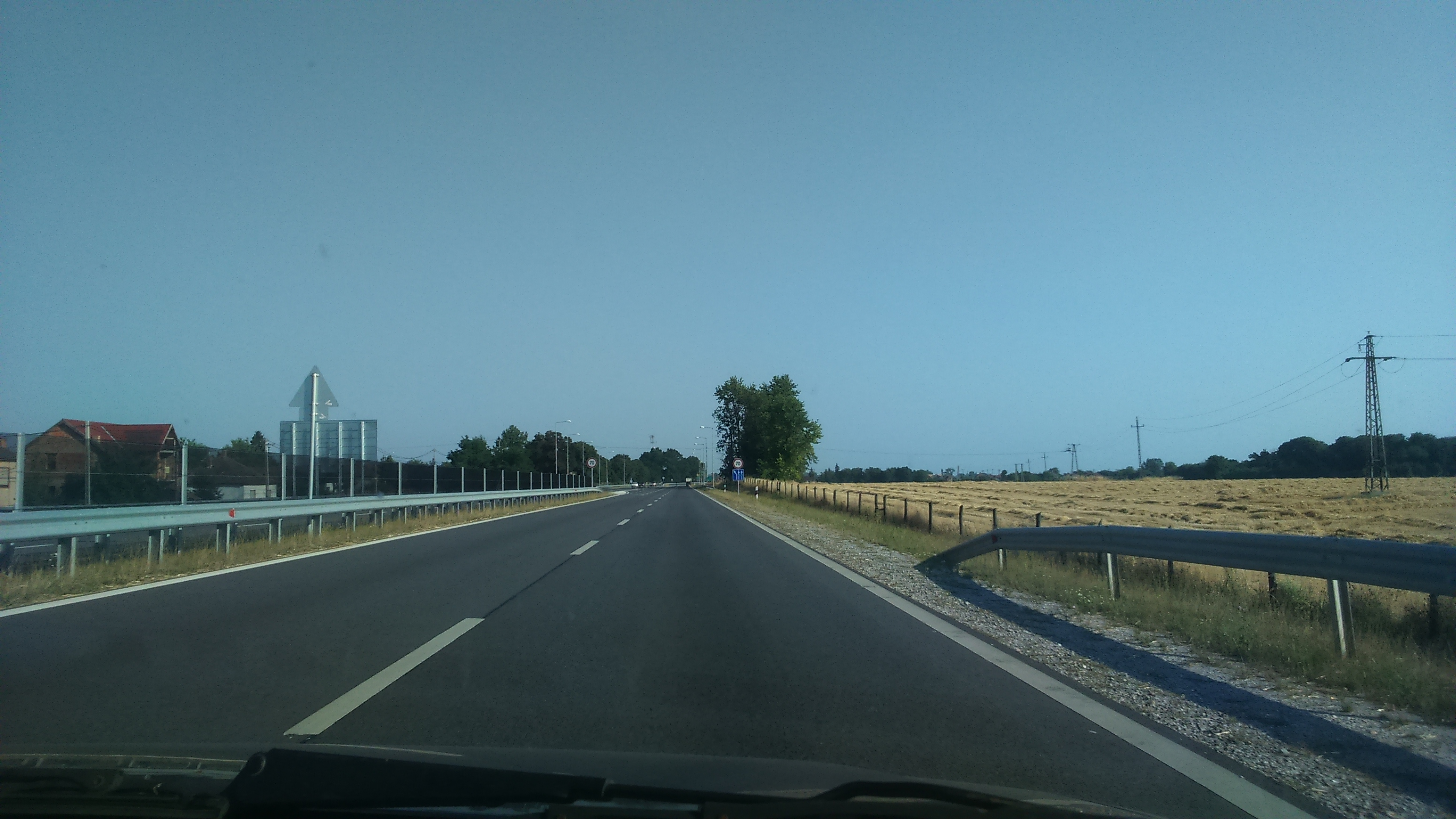
Main road 21 near Zagyvaszántó.

There are several dual carriageway main road sections in Hungary, which are similar in most technological respects to expressways but allow at-grade intersections. Speed limit at designated sections of these roads is 110 km/h or 70 mph.

- Several parts of Main road 3: Introductory road of Gyöngyös and Miskolc
- Several parts of Main road 4: between Budapest and Püspökladány (40 km) (The way between Budapest and Püspökladány is about 165 km/103miles)
- Main road 5: Introductory road of Kecskemét; between M5 motorway and Kecskemét (8 km)
- Main road 6: between Szekszárd and Tolna (4 km)
- Main road 8: between M7 motorway (Székesfehérvár) and Veszprém (50 km), Veszprém and Herend (11 km)
- Main road 11: between Budapest and Szentendre (4 km and 9 km within the city limit of Budapest)
- Main road 21: between M3 motorway (Hatvan) and Salgótarján (50 km)
- Main road 26: between Miskolc and Sajóbábony (10 km)
- Main road 37: between M30 motorway (Felsőzsolca) and Szerencs (27 km)
- Main road 44: between Békéscsaba and Gyula (11 km)
- Main road 47: between Szeged and Hódmezővásárhely (14 km)
- Main road 54: Southern bypass of Kecskemét, between M5 mototway and Main road 5, Mercedes-Benz factory (8 km)
- Main road 58: between Pécs and Pécs-Pogány International Airport (10 km)
- Main road 61: between Taszár and Kaposfő (19 km)
- Main road 67: between M7 mototway and Kaposvár (50 km)
- Several parts of Main road 76: Introductory road of Zalaegerszeg and Keszthely
- Main road 83: between M1 motorway (Győr) and Pápa (36 km)
- A section of Main road 84: between Sopron and the border with Austria (4 km)
- A section of Main road 86: between Egyházasrádóc and Körmend (3.5 km)
- Main road 471: between Debrecen and Hajdúsámson (5 km)

Planned routes:

- Main road 4: between M35 motorway Debrecen and Hajdúszoboszló (21,4 km)
- Main road 8: between Herend and Devecser (15,5 km)
- Main road 32: between M3 motorway Hatvan and Jászberény (25 km)
- Main road 354 and 4: between M35 motorway Debrecen and M3 motorway Nyíregyháza (57 km)
- Main road 74: between Zalaegerszeg and Nagykanizsa (50 km)

== European routes ==
The following European routes pass through Hungary:

=== Class A ===
- E60: (France, Switzerland, Austria, Germany, Austria) – Hegyeshalom – Mosonmagyaróvár – Győr – Tatabánya – Budapest – Szolnok – Püspökladány – Ártánd – (Romania, Georgia, Azerbaijan, Turkmenistan, Uzbekistan, Tajikistan, Kyrgyzstan, China)
- E65: (Sweden, Poland, Czech Republic, Slovakia) – Rajka – Csorna – Szombathely – Körmend – Zalaegerszeg – Nagykanizsa – Letenye – (Croatia, Bosnia and Herzegovina, Croatia, Montenegro, Kosovo, North Macedonia, Greece)
- E66: (Italy, Austria) – Rábafüzes – Körmend – Ajka – Veszprém – Székesfehérvár – Dunaújváros – Kecskemét – Cegléd
- E68: Szeged – Makó – Csanádpalota – (Romania)
- E71: (Slovakia) – Tornyosnémeti – Miskolc – Füzesabony – Hatvan – Budapest – Székesfehérvár – Siófok – Nagykanizsa – Letenye – (Croatia)
- E73: Budapest – Dunaújváros – Paks – Szekszárd – Mohács – Udvar – (Croatia, Bosnia and Herzegovina)
- E75: (Norway, Finland, Poland, Czech Republic, Slovakia) – Rajka – Győr – Tatabánya – Budapest – Kecskemét – Szeged – Röszke – (Serbia, North Macedonia, Greece)
- E77: (Russia, Estonia, Latvia, Lithuania, Russia, Poland, Slovakia) – Parassapuszta – Vác – Budapest
- E79: Miskolc – Polgár – Debrecen – Berettyóújfalu – Ártánd – (Romania, Bulgaria, Greece)

=== Class B ===
- E573: Püspökladány – Debrecen – Nyíregyháza – Záhony – (Ukraine)
- E575: (Slovakia) – Vámosszabadi – Győr
- E579: Görbeháza – Nyíregyháza – Vásárosnamény – Beregdaróc
- E653: (Slovenia) – Tornyiszentmiklós – Letenye
- E661: Balatonkeresztúr – Nagyatád – Barcs – (Croatia, Bosnia and Herzegovina)

== See also ==
- Transport in Hungary
- Roads in Hungary
- List of controlled-access highway systems
- Evolution of motorway construction in European nations
