= European route E579 =

Road in trans-European E-road network

E579

Major junctions
- From: Görbeháza
- To: Beregdaróc

Location
- Countries: Hungary

Highway system
- International E-road network; A Class; B Class

E579 is a European B class road in Hungary, connecting the villages Görbeháza and Beregdaróc.

== Route ==
- Hungary
  - Görbeháza – Nyíregyháza – Vásárosnamény – Beregdaróc
