= M31 motorway (Hungary) =

Road in Hungary

M31 motorway
- M31-es autópálya
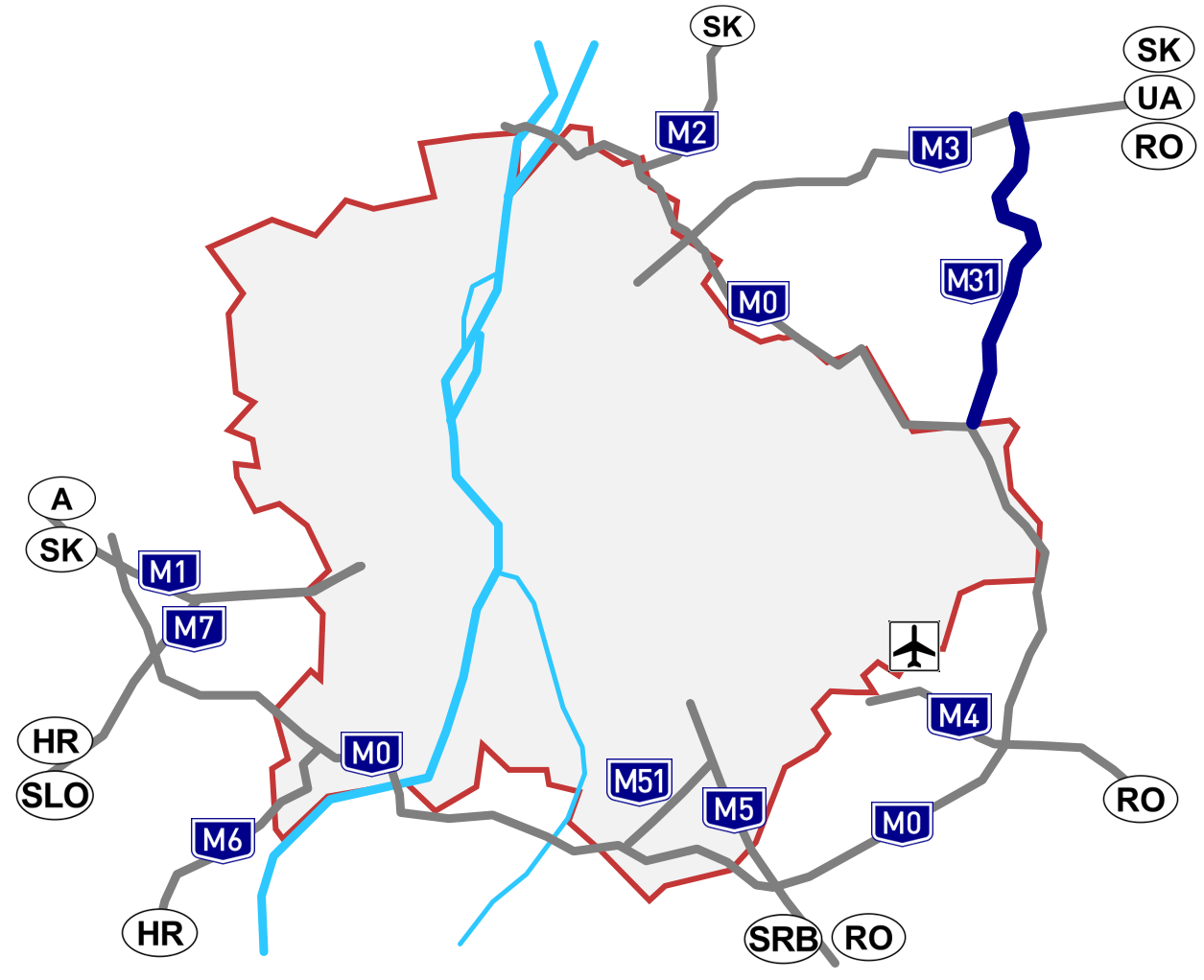

Route information
- Part of
- Length: 12 km (7.5 mi)

Major junctions
- From: M0 near Nagytarcsa
- To: M3 near Gödöllő

Location
- Country: Hungary
- Counties: Pest
- Major cities: Budapest, Gödöllő

Highway system
- Roads in Hungary; Highways; Main roads; Local roads

The M31 motorway (Hungarian: M31-es autópálya) is a motorway in Hungary, that runs between the M0 motorway at Nagytarcsa and the M3 motorway at Gödöllő. Its entire route coincides with the European route E71, which runs between Košice (Slovakia) and Split (Croatia).

== Municipalities ==
The M31 motorway runs through the following municipalities:

- Pest County: Budapest, Nagytarcsa, Kistarcsa, Kerepes, Gödöllő, Mogyoród

== Openings timeline ==
- Nagytarcsa; M0 – Gödöllő; M3 (44 km): 26 July 2010.

== Junctions, exits and rest area ==
- The route is full length motorway, this route is part of Budapest bypass. The maximum speed limit is 110 km/h (68 mph).

M0 (Nagytarcsa) – M3 (Gödöllő) (12 km)
Exit	km	Destinations	Notes
Interchange	0	Nagytarcsa; Budapest International Airport, Szolnok, Szeged, Pécs, Székesfehérvár, Győr – Vác, Szentendre	Budapest bypass
Exit	9	Gödöllő-West	
Interchange	12	Vác / Gödöllő; Budapest – Budapest International Airport, Szolnok, Szeged, Pécs, Székesfehérvár, Győr	The road turns toward → Budapest or Nyíregyháza

== See also ==
- Roads in Hungary
- Transport in Hungary
- International E-road network
