= Speed limits in Hungary =

Border road sign with general speed-limits in Hungary

General Speed limits (km/h)
| Type of road | Urban (lakott terület) | Rural highways (országút) | rural expressways (autóút) | motorways (autópálya) |
|---|---|---|---|---|
| Cars, motorcycles and vans | 50 | 90 | 110 | 130 |
| Cars and vans with trailers | 50 | 70 | 70 | 80 |
| Heavy goods vehicles (over 3.5 t) | 50 | 70 | 70 | 80 |
| Buses meeting detailed technical requirements | 50 | 80 | 80 | 100 |

Certain urban multiple-lane roads may have higher speed limits posted (usually 60,70 or 80 km/h).

In addition, many residential neighbourhoods have posted 30 km/h zones.

Also, certain rural highways may have higher speed limits posted (100 or 110 km/h).

== History ==
On 1 March 1993, the urban speed limit was lowered from 60 to 50 km/h.

On 1 May 2001, the rural speed limits were increased from 80 to 90 km/h on rural roads, from 100 to 110 km/h on expressways and from 120 to 130 km/h on motorways.
