= Hollád =

- Village
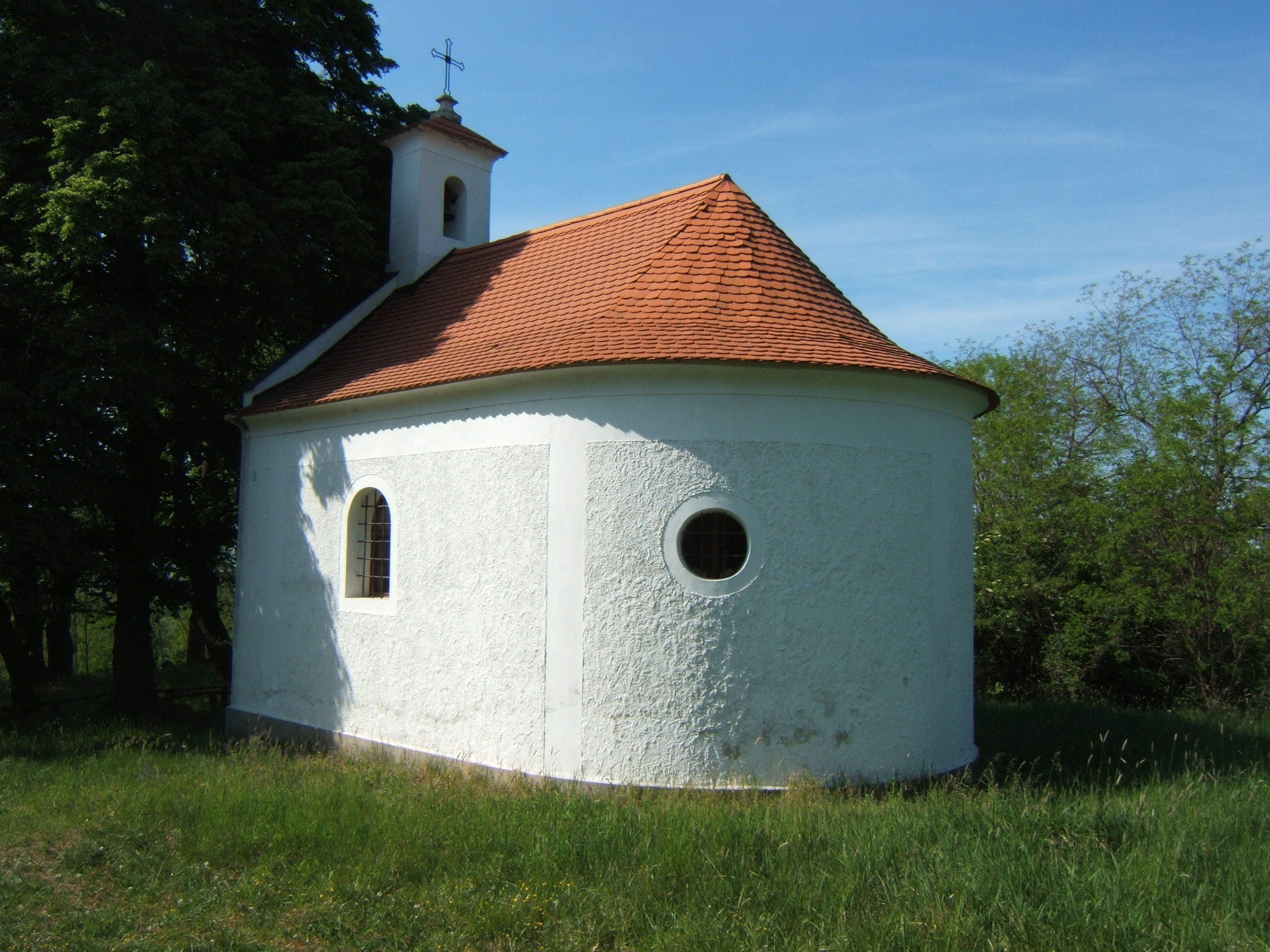
- Szent Donát-kápolna (English: Saint Donatus Chapel) in Hollád

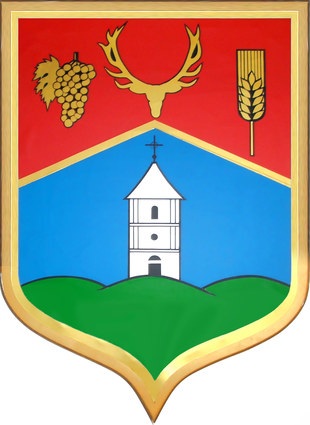
- Coat of arms

- Location of Somogy county in Hungary

- Location of Hollád
- Coordinates: 46.64140°N 17.30748°E
- Country: Hungary
- Region: Southern Transdanubia
- County: Somogy
- District: Marcali
- RC Diocese: Kaposvár

Area
  - Total: 8.2 km^{2} (3.2 sq mi)

Population (2017)
  - Total: 211
  - Density: 26/km^{2} (67/sq mi)
- Demonym: holládi
- Time zone: UTC+1 (CET)
  - Summer (DST): UTC+2 (CEST)
- Postal code: 8731
- Area code: (+36) 85
- Motorways: M7
- Distance from Budapest: 177 km (110 mi) Northeast
- NUTS 3 code: HU232
- MP: József Attila Móring (KDNP)
- Website: Hollád Online

Hollád is a village in Somogy county, Hungary.

The settlement is part of the Balatonboglár wine region.

== History ==
According to László Szita the settlement was completely Hungarian in the 18th century.
