= European route E661 =

Road in trans-European E-road network

E661

Route information
- Length: 447 km (278 mi)

Major junctions
- North end: Lake Balaton (Hungary)
- Marcali, Nagyatád, Barcs, Grubišno Polje, Daruvar, Pakrac, Gradiška, Banja Luka, Donji Vakuf, Travnik
- South end: Zenica

Location
- Countries: Hungary, Croatia, Bosnia and Herzegovina

Highway system
- International E-road network; A Class; B Class

European route E 661 is a part of the inter-European road system. This Class B north–south route is 449 kilometres (279 mi) long and it connects Lake Balaton in Hungary via western Slavonia in Croatia with Bosanska Krajina and central Bosnia.

== Itinerary ==
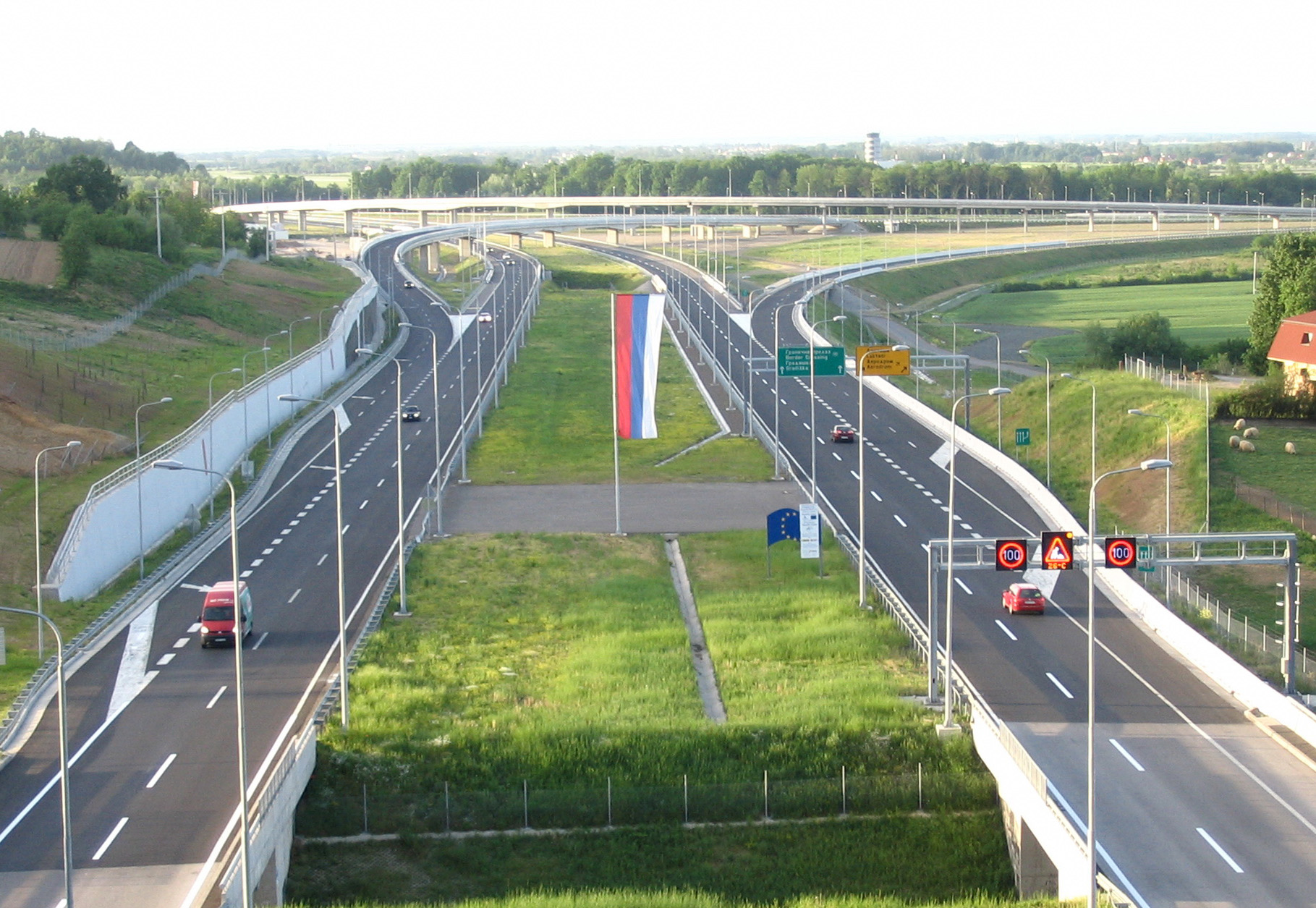
European route E661 near Laktaši, Bosnia and Herzegovina

The E 661 routes through three European countries:

- Hungary
  - 68: Balatonkeresztúr ( E71) - Nagyatád - Barcs
- Croatia
  - D5: Terezino Polje - Virovitica - Grubišno Polje - Daruvar - Pakrac - Lipik - Okučani ( E70) - Stara Gradiška
- Bosnia and Herzegovina
  - Republika Srpska
    - A-1 : Gradiška - Banja Luka
    - M-I-101 : Banja Luka - Ugar River
  - Federation of Bosnia and Herzegovina
    - M-16 : Ugar River -Jajce ( E761 )
    - M-5 : Jajce ( E761 ) - Donji Vakuf ( E761 ) - Travnik - Zenica ( E73 )
