= Levél =

Levél Kaltenstein
- Flag Coat of arms

- Location of Győr-Moson-Sopron county in Hungary

- Location of Levél
- Coordinates: 47.89373°N 17.20048°E
- Country: Hungary
- County: Győr-Moson-Sopron

Area
  - Total: 24.91 km^{2} (9.62 sq mi)

Population (2004)
  - Total: 1,713
  - Density: 68.76/km^{2} (178.1/sq mi)
- Time zone: UTC+1 (CET)
  - Summer (DST): UTC+2 (CEST)
- Postal code: 9221
- Area code: 96
- Motorways: M1, M15
- Distance from Budapest: 170 km (110 mi) Southeast

Levél (German: Kaltenstein) is a village in Győr-Moson-Sopron county, Hungary.

== Geography ==
Levél is in the north-west of Hungary, close to the M1 motorway, between the larger villages of Mosonmagyaróvár and Hegyeshalom. It is also close to EV13. The village is 7.23 kilometres (4.49 mi) west of the border with Austria, and 12.74 kilometres (7.92 mi) south of the border with Slovakia.

== History ==
The village was first mentioned as Kalthostan in a German text of 1410. The Hungarian name first appears in a tax registration in 1532.

The Turkish local governor depopulated the village in 1529. In 1570 Maximilian II deported the Württemberg Saxons to the area. The French occupation of 1809 resulted in economic hardship for the population. The village gained access to electricity in 1926. In the Second World War the village's agricultural produce and livestock was requisitioned by the Wehrmacht, leading to food shortages. Most of German population was deported after the war. During the Communist era, the area saw economic growth brought on by state investment.

== Demographics ==
The population of the area is gradually increasing. Statistically, 50-60% of the population require income support. Only 6% of the population have completed higher education. 49% of the population work in industry, 6.5% in agriculture and 15% in commerce. Much of the population works in Mosonmagyaróvár.

== Infrastructure ==
The infrastructure of the village is seen as generally good. A water conduit system was constructed in 1997. 98% of the population have telephone lines, and cable television is common.
