= Nagykereki =

- Coat of arms

- Location of Nagykereki in Hungary
- Coordinates: 47.18719°N 21.78766°E
- Country: Hungary
- Region: Northern Great Plain
- County: Hajdú-Bihar
- Subregion: Berettyóújfalui
- Rank: Village

Area
  - Total: 37.27 km^{2} (14.39 sq mi)

Population (1 January 2008)
  - Total: 1,275
  - Density: 34.21/km^{2} (88.60/sq mi)
- Time zone: UTC+1 (CET)
  - Summer (DST): UTC+2 (CEST)
- Postal code: 4127
- Area code: +36 54
- KSH code: 08907
- Website: http://www.nagykereki.hu

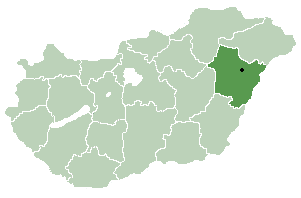
Location of Hajdú-Bihar county in Hungary

Nagykereki is a village in Hajdú-Bihar county, in the Northern Great Plain region of eastern Hungary.

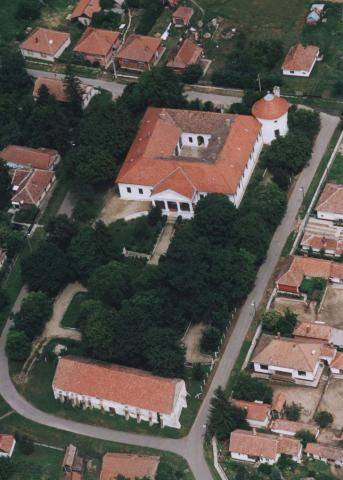
Aerial photography of Nagykereki

== Geography ==
It covers an area of 37.27 km² and has a population of 1384 people (2001).
