= Hont, Hungary =

Village in Hungary

Coordinates: 48°03′02″N 18°59′33″E

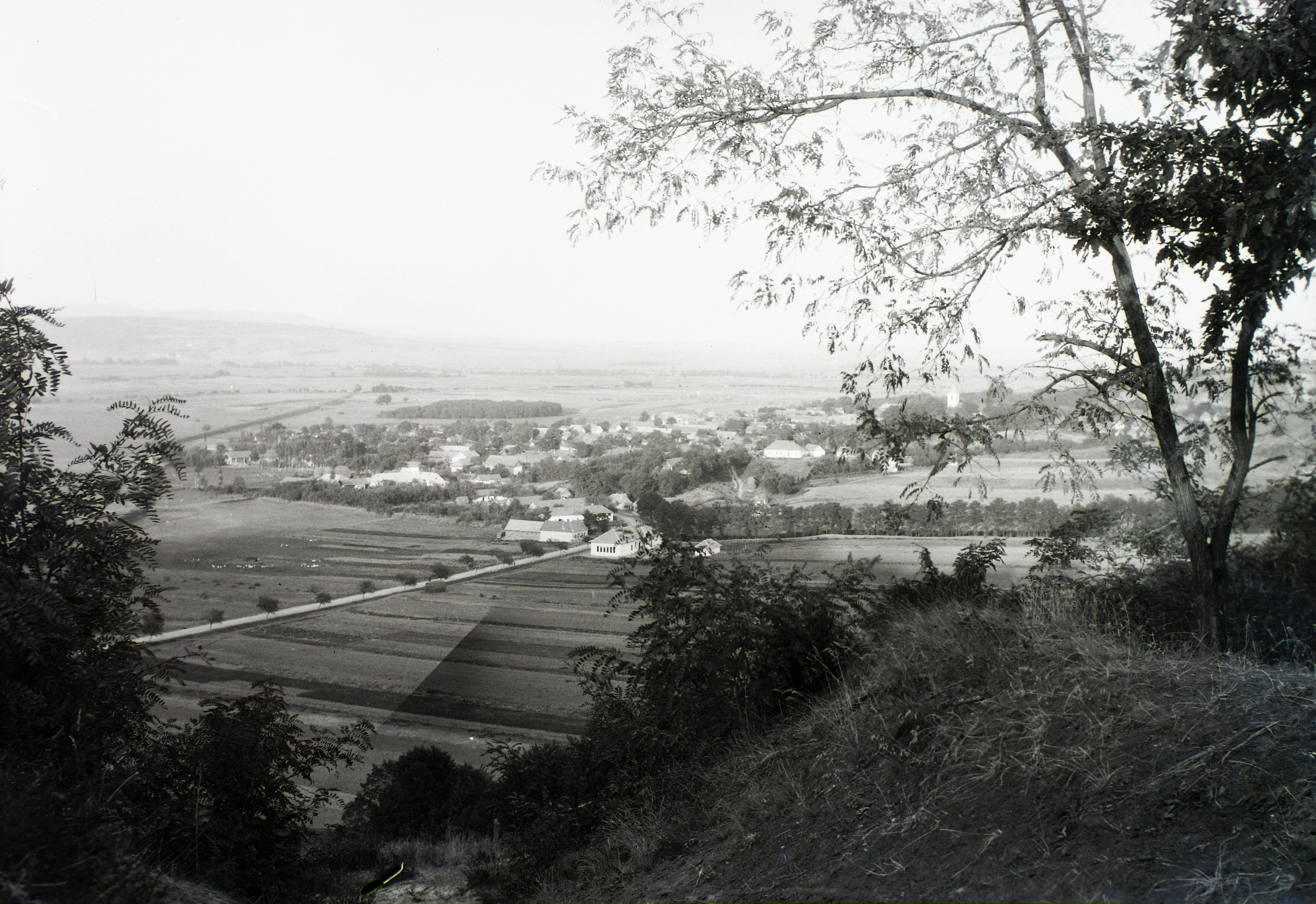
Nógrád megye, Hont látképe. Fortepan 95379

Hont is a village in Nógrád County in Hungary.

== Location ==
Hont is located on left bank of river Ipoly about 77 kilometres north of Budapest. The E77 European main road drives by the village. Hont lies north of Börzsöny mountains in Ipeľ (Hungarian Ipoly) valley.

== History ==
The settlement was founded by Hunt and Poznan on turn of 10th and 11th centuries. They were German knights and brothers according to Simonis de Keza, who was a Hungarian historian in the 13th century. Hunt built an earth fort onto peninsula of Ipeľ. This earth fort became centre of medieval Hont County. The name of the county and the settlement derived from Hunt's name, what means captain in old German language. There was probably built another fort near to Hunt's castle onto a hill by Poznan.

The peninsula castle was the administrative centre of Hont County until the middle of the 13th century, when it lost its importance and was set on fire by either its proprietors or Tartars. The castle area was occupied by the settlement, so it is covered with houses now.

The village became property of Archbishopric of Esztergom in 1436. The archbishopric remained owner until 1945. The Roman Catholic church was built in Baroque style in 1776. After World War II, Hont was annexed to Nógrád County.
