= Balatonkeresztúr =

- Village
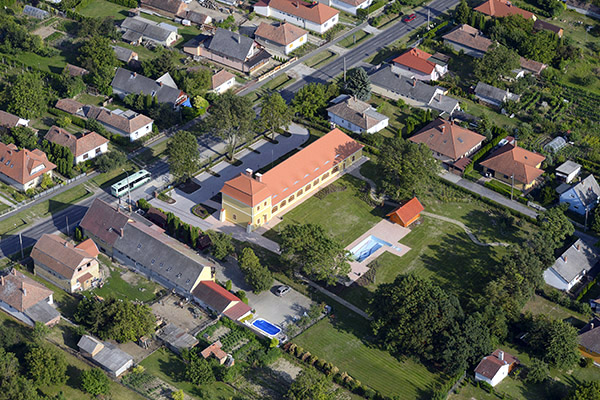
- Aerial view of Balatonkeresztúr

- Flag Coat of arms

- Location of Balatonkeresztúr
- Coordinates: 46.69559°N 17.37154°E
- Country: Hungary
- Region: Southern Transdanubia
- County: Somogy
- District: Marcali
- RC Diocese: Kaposvár

Area
  - Total: 21.06 km^{2} (8.13 sq mi)

Population (2017)
  - Total: 1,492
  - Density: 70.85/km^{2} (183.5/sq mi)
- Demonym(s): keresztúri, balatonkeresztúri
- Time zone: UTC+1 (CET)
  - Summer (DST): UTC+2 (CEST)
- Postal code: 8648
- Area code: (+36) 85
- Motorways: M7
- Distance from Budapest: 167 km (104 mi) Northeast
- NUTS 3 code: HU232
- MP: József Attila Móring (KDNP)
- Website: Balatonkeresztúr Online

Balatonkeresztúr is a village in Somogy county, Hungary.

The settlement is part of the Balatonboglár wine region.

== Etymology ==
According to the local tradition, the village's name comes from the crossing of roads (Hungarian: kereszteződés, keresztezés). However, the more well-accepted theory states that, like many other villages in Somogy County, Balatonkeresztúr was named after the patron of its church, in this case, Szent Kereszt (English: Holy Cross).

== History ==
According to László Szita, the settlement was completely Hungarian in the 18th century.

== Culture ==
The Hungarian folk song Szép a huszár, ha felül a lovára was collected in 1923 in Balatonkeresztúr by Lajos Bárdos.
