= Beregdaróc =

Place in Hungary

- Location within Szabolcs-Szatmár-Bereg County Location within Hungary
- Coordinates: 48°12′N 22°32′E
- Country: Hungary
- County: Szabolcs-Szatmár-Bereg

Area
  - Total: 23.82 km^{2} (9.20 sq mi)

Population (2002)
  - Total: 855
  - Density: 35.81/km^{2} (92.7/sq mi)
- Time zone: UTC+1 (CET)
  - Summer (DST): UTC+2 (CEST)
- Postal code: 4934
- Area code: 45

Location of Szabolcs-Szatmar-Bereg county in Hungary

Beregdaróc is a village in Szabolcs-Szatmár-Bereg county, in the Northern Great Plain region of eastern Hungary.

Jews lived in Beregdaróc for many years until they were murdered in the Holocaust

== Geography ==
It covers an area of 23.82 km^{2} (9 sq mi) and has a population of 855 people (2001).

This village is the Eastern entry point for Hungarian imports of natural gas shipped via Ukraine. 27m cubic metres per day is imported for Hungarian domestic consumption, and an additional 18 m cubic metres per day is imported for transhipment to Serbia and Bosnia/Herzegovina. 82% is from Russian sources, and 18% from Turkmenistan sources, according to the Hungarian Energy Office.

This village is currently witnessing ground clearance for the M3 motorway border crossing between Hungary and Ukraine. This is at kilometre 307 from Budapest.
