= Nagytarcsa =

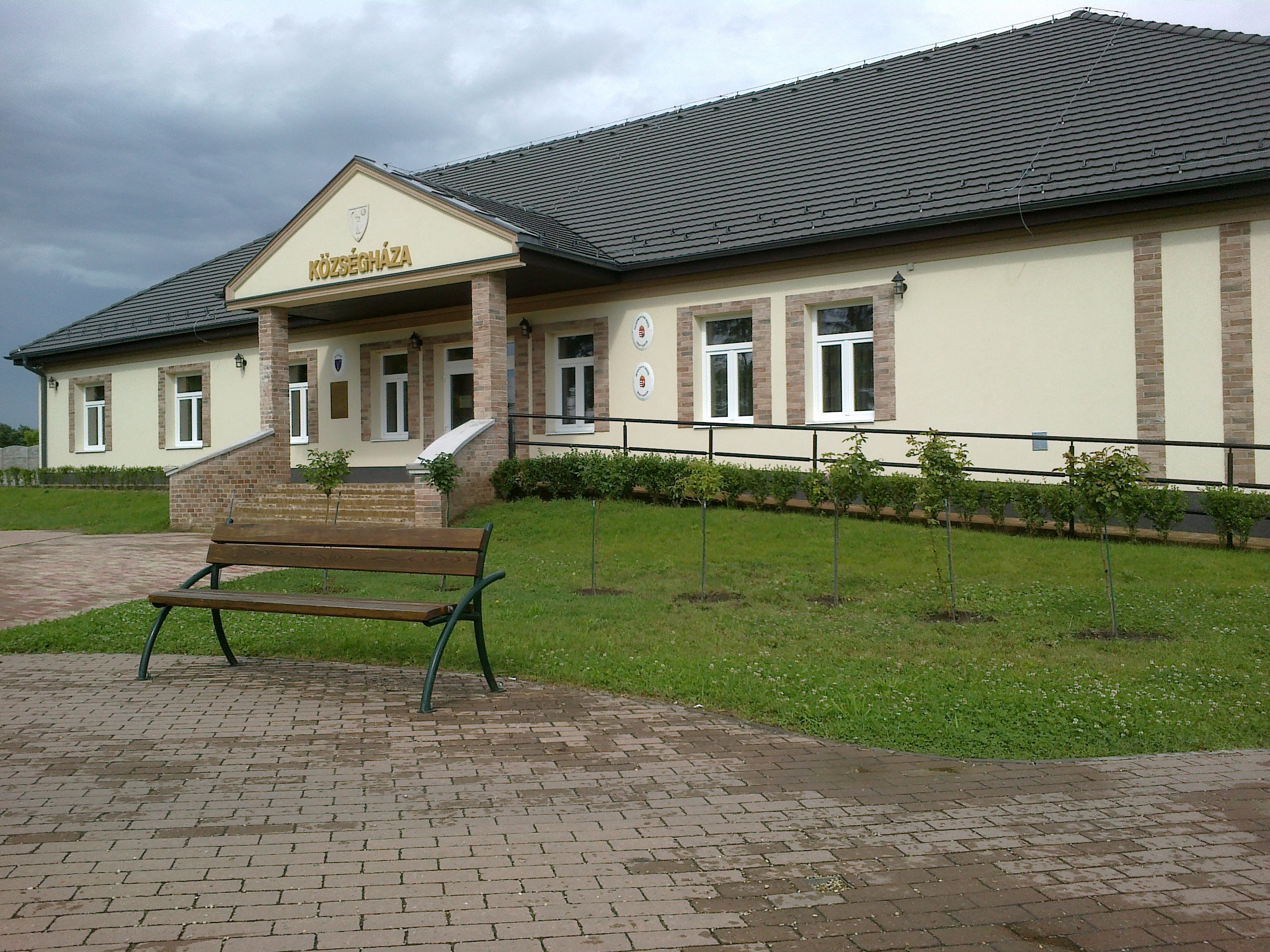
- Municipal office

- Flag Coat of arms

- Location of Nagytarcsa in Hungary
- Coordinates: 47.52584°N 19.28620°E
- Country: Hungary
- Region: Central Hungary
- County: Pest
- District: Gödöllő
- Rank: Village

Government
  - Mayor: Győri Péter

Area
  - Total: 12.13 km^{2} (4.68 sq mi)

Population (1 January 2008)
  - Total: 3,454
  - Density: 284.7/km^{2} (737.5/sq mi)
- Time zone: UTC+1 (CET)
  - Summer (DST): UTC+2 (CEST)
- Postal code: 2142
- Area code: +36 28
- KSH code: 23409
- Website: www.nagytarcsa.hu

Nagytarcsa is a village in Pest county, Budapest metropolitan area, Hungary. It has a population of 3,325 (2007).
