= Görbeháza =

Coordinates: 47°50′N 21°14′E

- Interactive map of Görbeháza
- Country: Hungary
- County: Hajdú-Bihar

Area
  - Total: 80.2 km^{2} (31.0 sq mi)

Population (2015)
  - Total: 2,366
  - Density: 29.5/km^{2} (76/sq mi)
- Time zone: UTC+1 (CET)
  - Summer (DST): UTC+2 (CEST)
- Postal code: 4075
- Area code: 52

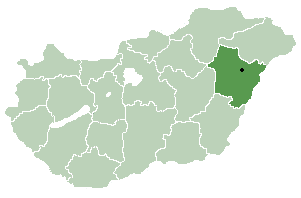
Location of Hajdú-Bihar county in Hungary

Görbeháza is a village in Hajdú-Bihar county, in the Northern Great Plain region of eastern Hungary.

== Location ==
It is located in the north-western part of the county, about 50 kilometres north-west of Debrecen, and a similar distance from Miskolc and Nyíregyháza.

A separate part of the municipality is Bagota, 9 km south of the centre.

The immediate neighbours are Hajdúnánás to the north-east, Hajdúböszörmény to the south-east, Balmazújváros to the south, Újszentmargita to the south-west, Folyás to the west and Polgár to the north-west.

== History ==
The original name of Görbeháza was Görbeházpuszta, which belonged to the neighbouring settlement of Polgár. It was named after the L-shaped house there, which is called "görbeház" in this region. According to tradition, this house was a tavern on the edge of the Hortobágy puszta, frequented by shepherds and outlaws, with a large cellar, traces of which can still be seen today.

The history of the village was intertwined with the neighbouring settlement of Polgár, which was a part of the civil estate of the Eger Chapter.

According to the 1910 census, Görbeház is a bare inhabited place with 165 inhabitants. During the Nagyatád land reform, the idea of creating a settled village in Polgár was raised. The idea was motivated by the fact that the present area of Görbeháza, the estates called Nagykapros and Lipcsei-hát, which were intended for distribution anyway, were far away from Polgár (13 km) and were considered to be very unsuitable for cultivation in small pieces.

Under the land reform, a new settlement village was created in Görbeház-Puszta in 1924.

The village was actually built between 1925 and 1929, in a planned engineering layout, for which the builders received state loans.

Its population grew rapidly as new plots were allocated in 1939-1940 as a result of national land policy measures. At that time, its independence was no longer in doubt, but it was not formally granted until 1945, when it had a population of 1,638 inhabitants and was granted the status of a large municipality in that year.

The name of the municipality, which had previously been provisionally called Görbeháza, was finalised by Decree No 015.304 (12.III.1948) of the Minister of the Interior.

== Geography ==
It covers an area of 80.2 km^{2} (31 sq mi) and has a population of 2366 people (2015).
