= Main road 3 (Hungary) =

Road in Hungary

Main road 3
- 3-as főút
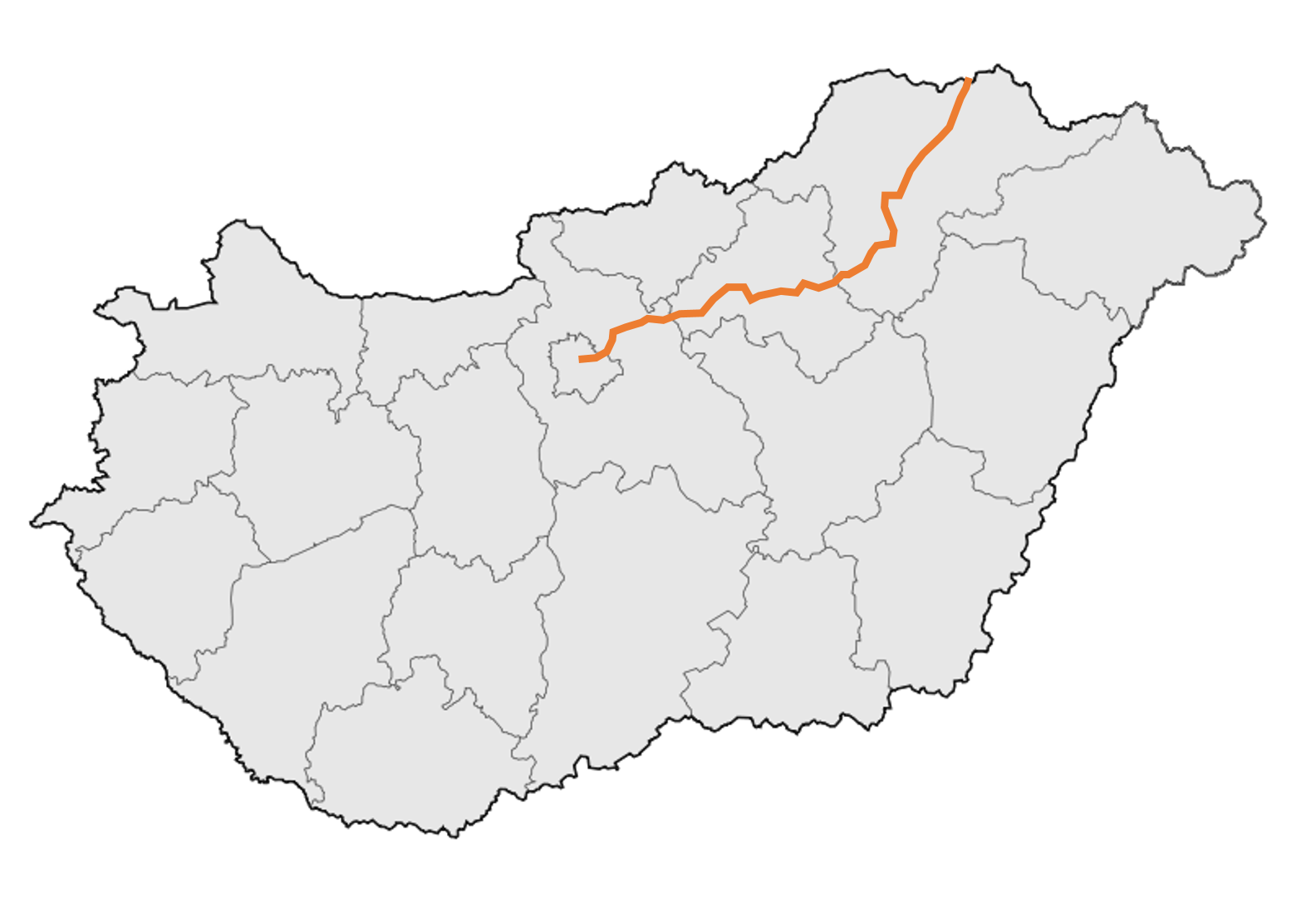

Route information
- Part of E71 / E79
- Length: 247 km (153 mi)

Major junctions
- From: Budapest
- M0 near Budapest, XVI.; M31 near Gödöllő; 21 in Hatvan; 32 near Hatvan; 24 in Gyöngyös; 25 in Kerecsend; M25 near Füzesabony; 33 near Füzesabony; 331 near Mezőkövesd; 253 near Mezőkövesd; 302 in Emőd; 35 in Nyékládháza; 304 near Miskolc; 26 in Miskolc; M30 near Miskolc; 37 near Miskolc; 39 near Encs; M30 in Garadna; M30 in Hernádszurdok
- To: Tornyosnémeti; I/17 border with Slovakia

Location
- Country: Hungary
- Counties: Pest, Heves, Borsod-Abaúj-Zemplén
- Major cities: Budapest, Kistarcsa, Kerepes, Gödöllő, Aszód, Hatvan, Gyöngyös, Füzesabony, Mezőkövesd, Emőd, Nyékládháza, Miskolc, Felsőzsolca, Szikszó, Encs

Highway system
- Roads in Hungary; Highways; Main roads; Local roads

The Main road 3 (Hungarian: 3-as főút) is a west–east direction First class main road in Hungary, that connects Budapest with Tornyosnémeti (the border of Slovakia). The road is 247 kilometres (153 mi) long.

The existing route is a main road with two traffic lanes, except for introductory path of Gyöngyös, which is partially built with four traffic lanes. Most of the traffic was taken over by M3, and M30 motorway.

The road and all other main roads in Hungary are managed and maintained by Magyar Közút, a state-owned company.

== See also ==
- Roads in Hungary
