= M30 motorway (Hungary) =

Road in Hungary

M30 motorway
- M30-as autópálya
- Part of Via Carpathia
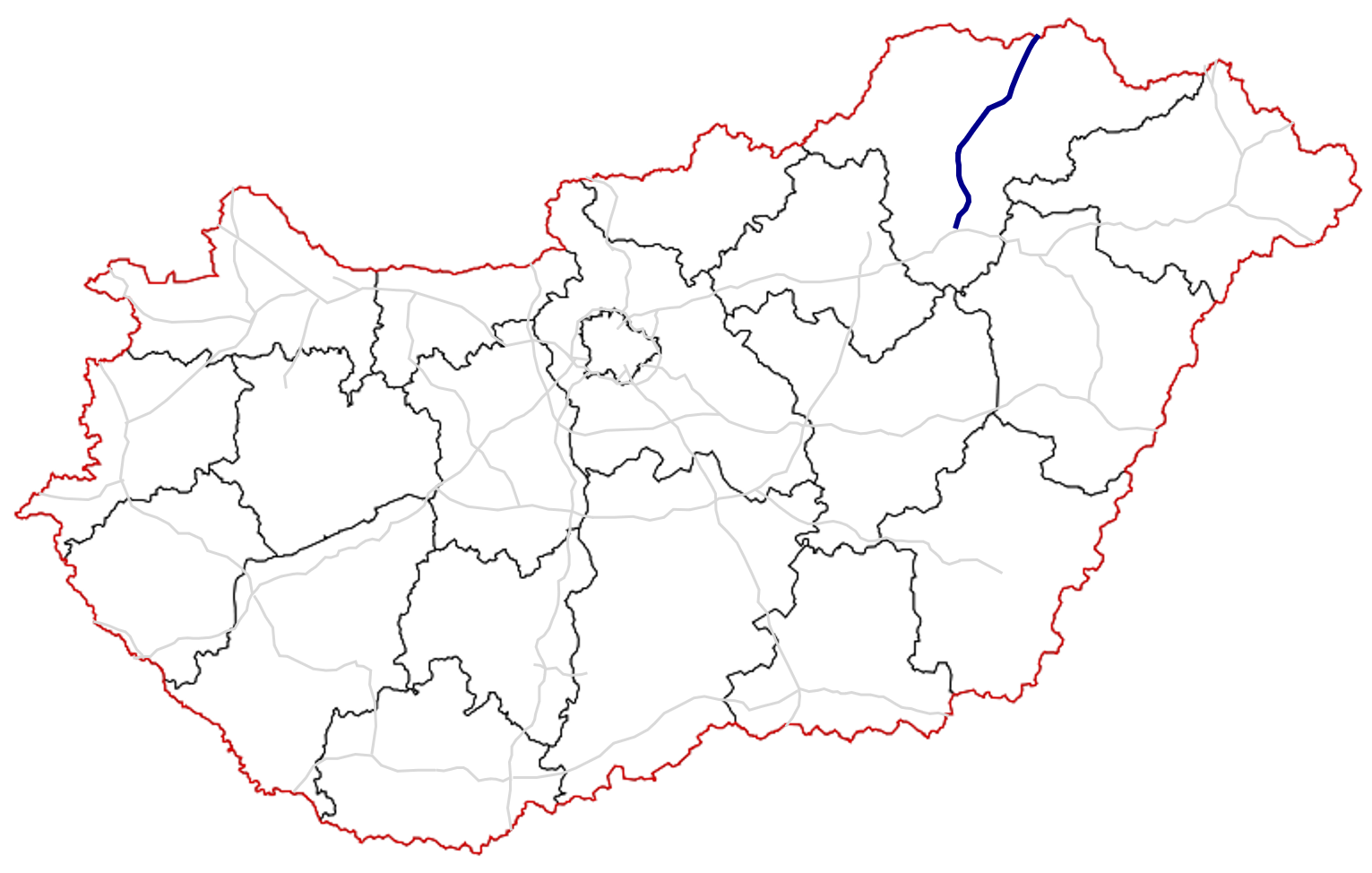
- in use other highways

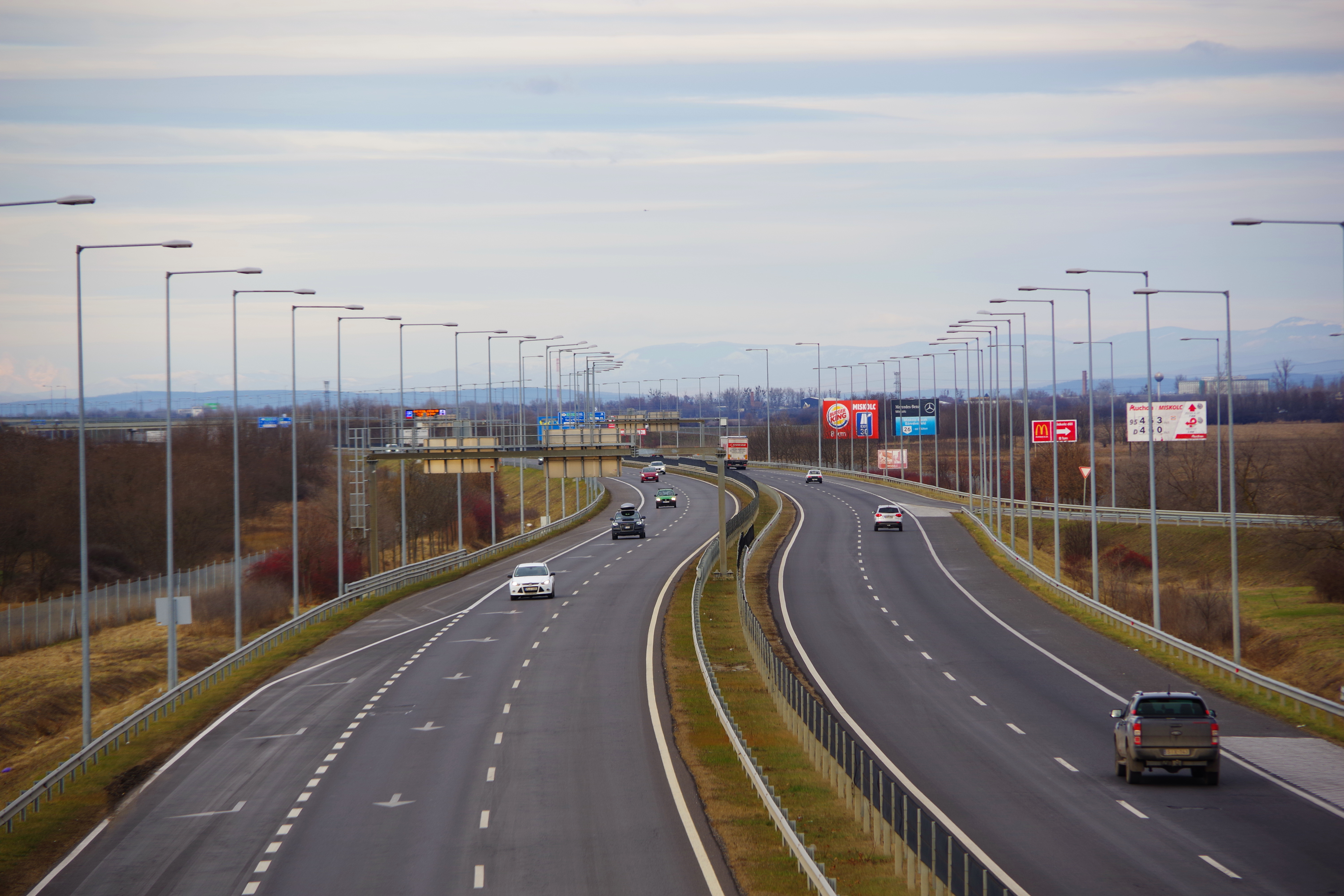
- M30 near Miskolc

Route information
- Part of E71 / E79
- Length: 86.8 km (53.9 mi)
- Existed: 2002–present

Major junctions
- From: M3 near Emőd
- 302 near Emőd; 35 near Nyékládháza; 304 in Miskolc-dél; 37 in Miskolc-kelet; 306 in Miskolc-észak; 39 in Encs
- To: R4 border with Slovakia

Location
- Country: Hungary
- Counties: Borsod-Abaúj-Zemplén
- Major cities: Miskolc

Highway system
- Roads in Hungary; Highways; Main roads; Local roads

The M30 motorway (Hungarian: M30-as autópálya) is a Hungarian motorway that connects the M3 motorway to the Slovak R4 expressway near the border town of Tornyosnémeti via Miskolc, forming part of European routes E71 and E79. The first section opened to the public in 2002, and reached the border area in October 2021.

The road is considered part of the planned Via Carpathia from the Baltic coast to Sofia. It follows the route of Main road 3.

== Timeline ==
Section	Length	Opened	Notes
Mezőcsát (M3) – Emőd	6.0 km (3.73 mi)	2002	
Emőd – Nyékládháza	8.0 km (4.97 mi)	2003	
Nyékládháza – Miskolc kelet	15.0 km (9.32 mi)	December 2004	with Miskolc bypass I.
Miskolc bypass II. (Miskolc kelet – Miskolc észak)	3.0 km (1.86 mi)	Single carriageway: 26 June 2015; Second carriageway: 26 October 2021	Both carriageways were fully built between 2018 – 2021.
Miskolc észak – Tornyosnémeti	56.8 km (35.29 mi)	26 October 2021	Built between 2018 – 2021.
Tornyosnémeti to the border	1.7 km (1.06 mi)	16 January 2018	

== Route description ==
- The route is full length motorway. The maximum speed limit is 130 km/h, with (2x2 lane road with stop lane).

County	km	Type	Destination	Notes
Borsod-Abaúj-Zemplén	0	Interchange	M3 / E71 – Budapest M3 / E79 – Nyíregyháza, Debrecen (M35)	The southern terminus of the motorway, E71, E79 route, and Via Carpathia. Kilometrage starting point trumpet interchange
Borsod-Abaúj-Zemplén	6	Exit	Emőd	
Borsod-Abaúj-Zemplén	12	Rest area	Hejőkeresztúri pihenőhely	parking, WC, and water pihenőhely means Rest area
Borsod-Abaúj-Zemplén	14	Exit	Main road 35 – Nyékládháza / Tiszaújváros	
Borsod-Abaúj-Zemplén	21	Exit	Sajópetri / Kistokaj	
Borsod-Abaúj-Zemplén	24	Exit	Main road 304 – Miskolc dél, Mályi	Southern end of Miskolc bypass dél means South
Borsod-Abaúj-Zemplén		Bridge	Sajó híd	híd means Bridge
Borsod-Abaúj-Zemplén	30	Exit	3 / E71 – Miskolc kelet, Felsőzsolca / Main road 37 – Sátoraljaújhely, Szerencs	kelet means East
Borsod-Abaúj-Zemplén	33	Exit	Main road 306 – Miskolc észak, towards to Main road 26 – Kazincbarcika	Connecting to the Airport and Miskolc Industrial Park Northern end of Miskolc bypass észak means North
Borsod-Abaúj-Zemplén	35		Tengelysúlymérő állomás	Tengelysúlymérő állomás means weigh in motion (traffic control)
Borsod-Abaúj-Zemplén	40	Exit	Main road 3 – Szikszó	Connecting to Angel Truck Parking with petrol station, restaurant, WC, and shower facilities.
Borsod-Abaúj-Zemplén	51	Exit	Halmaj / Kázsmárk	
Borsod-Abaúj-Zemplén	56	Rest area	Abaúj pihenőhely	parking, WC, and water (petrol station in the future)
Borsod-Abaúj-Zemplén	64	Exit	Main road 3 – Forró / Main road 39 – Encs	Connecting to petrol station and the highway engineers
Borsod-Abaúj-Zemplén	67	Rest area	Aba Sámuel pihenőhely	parking, WC, and water
Borsod-Abaúj-Zemplén	75	Exit	Main road 3 – Novajidrány, Garadna	
Borsod-Abaúj-Zemplén	81	Exit	Main road 3 – Hidasnémeti, Gönc, Hernádszurdok	Incomplete junction: exit ramp only from/to → Budapest
Borsod-Abaúj-Zemplén	85	Rest area	Szent Erzsébet pihenőhely	parking, WC, and water
Borsod-Abaúj-Zemplén	86	Exit	Tornyosnémeti	Connecting to Autohof MyWay Truck Parking with restaurant, WC, and shower facilities.
Borsod-Abaúj-Zemplén	88	Border crossing within the EU	Tornyosnémeti (H) – Milhosť (SK) border crossing R4 / E71 – Košice	Tornyosnémeti border crossing to Slovakia → R4 expressway. The northern terminus of the motorway, E71 concurrency, and Via Carpathia.
1.000 mi = 1.609 km; 1.000 km = 0.621 mi: Concurrency terminus; Incomplete access; Unopened

== Maintenance ==
The operation and maintenance of the road is by Hungarian Concession Infrastructure Development Plc. This activity is provided by these highway engineers.

- near Emőd (M3), kilometre trench 151
- near Encs, kilometre trench 63

== Payment and usage ==
Hungarian system has 2 main type in terms of usage:

1, time-restricted nation-wide vignettes (E-matrica);

- Cars, vans and motorbikes up to 3.5 tonnes only need to buy a single vignette which costs 6,400 Hungarian forint (Ft) for 10 days, 10,360 Ft for 1 month and 57,260 Ft for a year, from 1 January 2024.

2, annual county vignettes (Megyei matrica); the highway can be used instead of the national sticker with the following county stickers:

Type of county vignette	Available section
Borsod-Abaúj-Zemplén	full length (0 km – 86 km)

== European Route(s) ==
Name	Route
	86 km	(Slovakia) Rýchlostná cesta R4 – junction (0)

== See also ==
- Roads in Hungary
- Transport in Hungary
- International E-road network
