= European route E71 =

Road in trans-European E-road network

E71

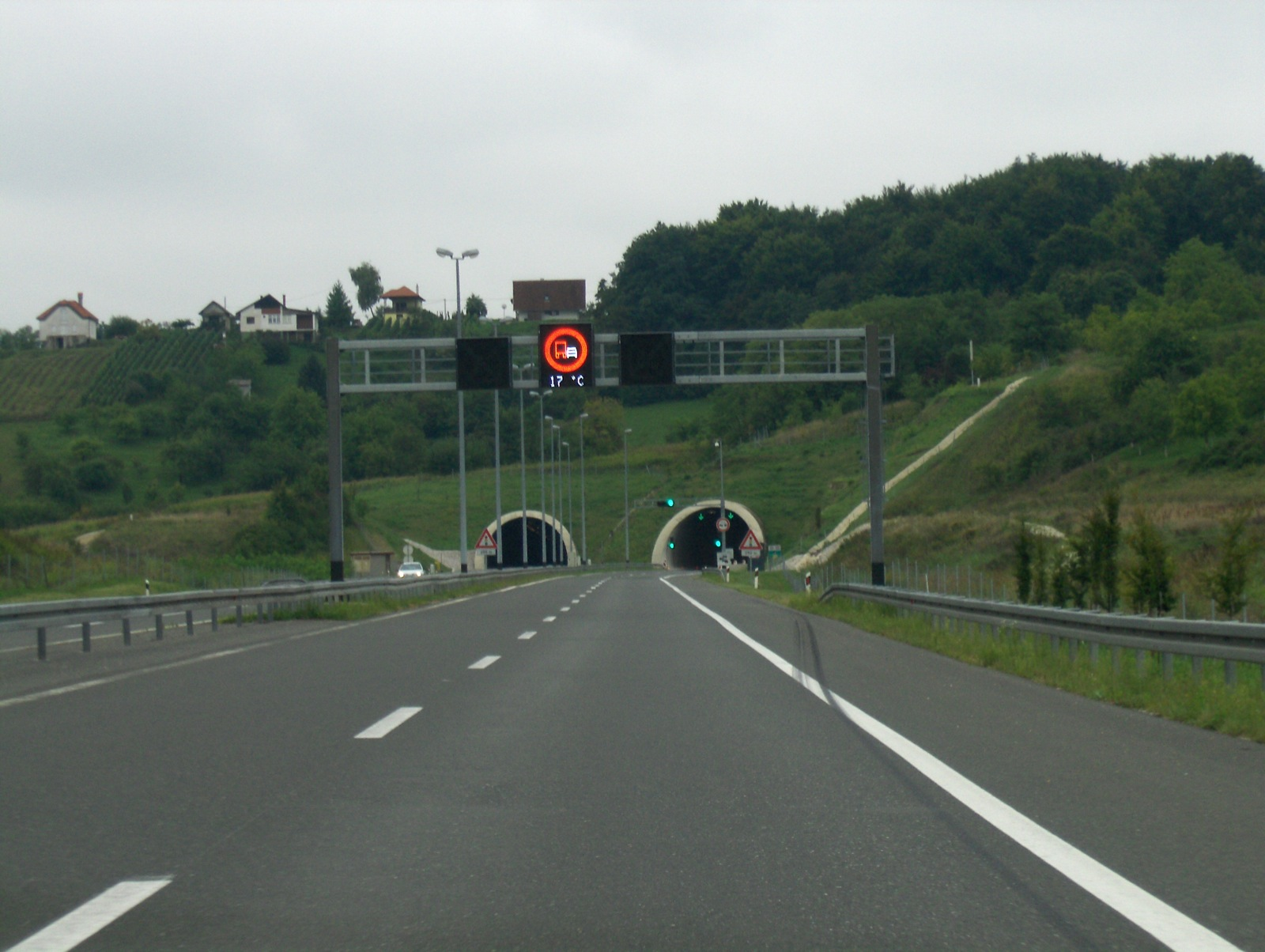
- E71 as Croatian A4 motorway south of Varaždin

Route information
- Length: 1,016 km (631 mi)

Major junctions
- North end: Košice, Slovakia
- Emőd; Budapest; Zagreb; Karlovac; Dugopolje
- South end: Split, Croatia

Location
- Countries: Slovakia; Hungary; Croatia; Bosnia and Herzegovina (Note: Route officially goes through Bihać, Bosnia and Herzegovina, but is signed via Gospić, Croatia)

Highway system
- International E-road network; A Class; B Class

European route E 71 is a north-south Class-A intermediate European road route. It begins in Košice, Slovakia, passes through Budapest in Hungary, Zagreb in Croatia, and ends at Split in Croatia on the Adriatic Sea coast. The total length of the route is 1,016 km (631 mi). The E71 mostly consists of motorways, though considerable sections are also expressways or two-lane roads with at-grade intersections. Nearly all motorway sections of the E71 are tolled, using various toll collection systems including electronic toll collection (ETC) and ticket systems. Individual segments of the E71 route are shared with several other European routes. The E71 section between Karlovac and Split is inconsistently physically signposted or marked on maps and route planning software. The E71 route has gradually been upgraded from a regular two-lane road to motorway standards since the 1970s; upgrades are still being carried out in some areas.

== Route description ==
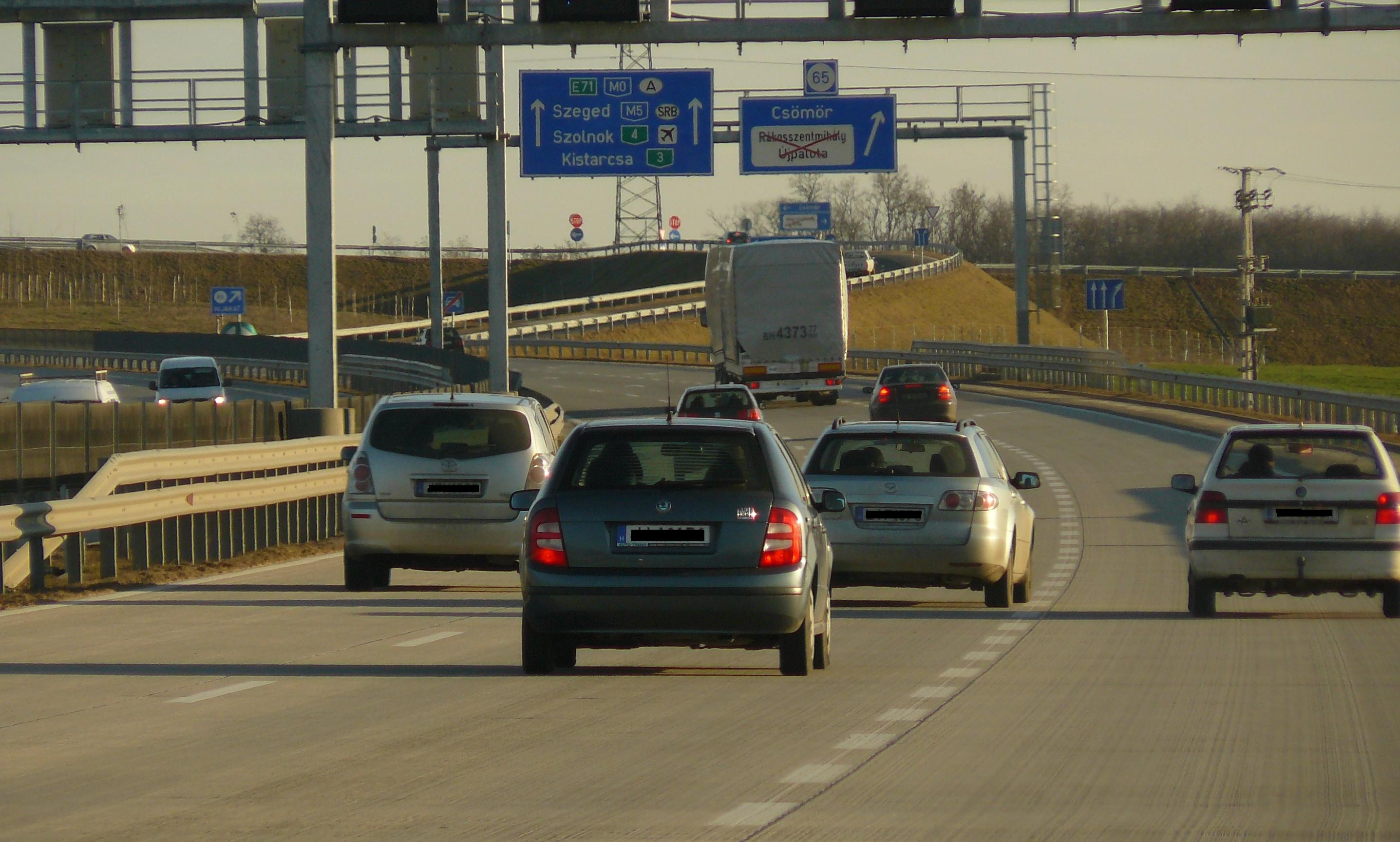
E71 as Hungarian M0 motorway, near Budapest

The European route E71 is part of the International E-road network, and is 989 km (615 mi) long, connecting parts of the Slovak, Hungarian and Croatian hinterland to the Adriatic coast. The route is a Class A intermediate north-south road, mostly consisting of motorways, but also comprising two-lane roads with at-grade intersections. The E71 starts in Košice, Slovakia, on the D1/R4 junction and proceeds south towards Milhost' and the Hungarian border along the R4 highway. The Slovak section of the E71 is 18 kilometres (11 miles) long.

The northernmost section of the E71 in Hungary connects the border crossing with Slovakia at Tornyosnémeti, and Miskolc. It is signposted as route 3, and this section is a two-lane road with at-grade intersections. The Tornyosnémeti–Miskolc section is concurrent with the European route E79. At Miskolc, the E71 switches to the M30 motorway which takes it to Emőd, where the E71 switches to the M3 motorway and turns west towards Budapest. The M3 carries the E71 route to Gödöllő, where the E71 switches to the M31 motorway. The M31 in turn takes the E71 to the Budapest ring motorway signposted as M0 motorway, where the E71 is concurrent with the European routes E60 and E75. The M0 motorway carries the E71 (along with the E60 and E75) around Budapest to its western outskirts. The final leg of the E71 route in Hungary is the M7 motorway between Érd just to the west of Budapest, via Székesfehérvár and Nagykanizsa to the Letenye border crossing to Croatia. South of Nagykanizsa, the E71 is concurrent with the European route E65. The Hungarian section of the E71 is 495 kilometres (308 miles) long.

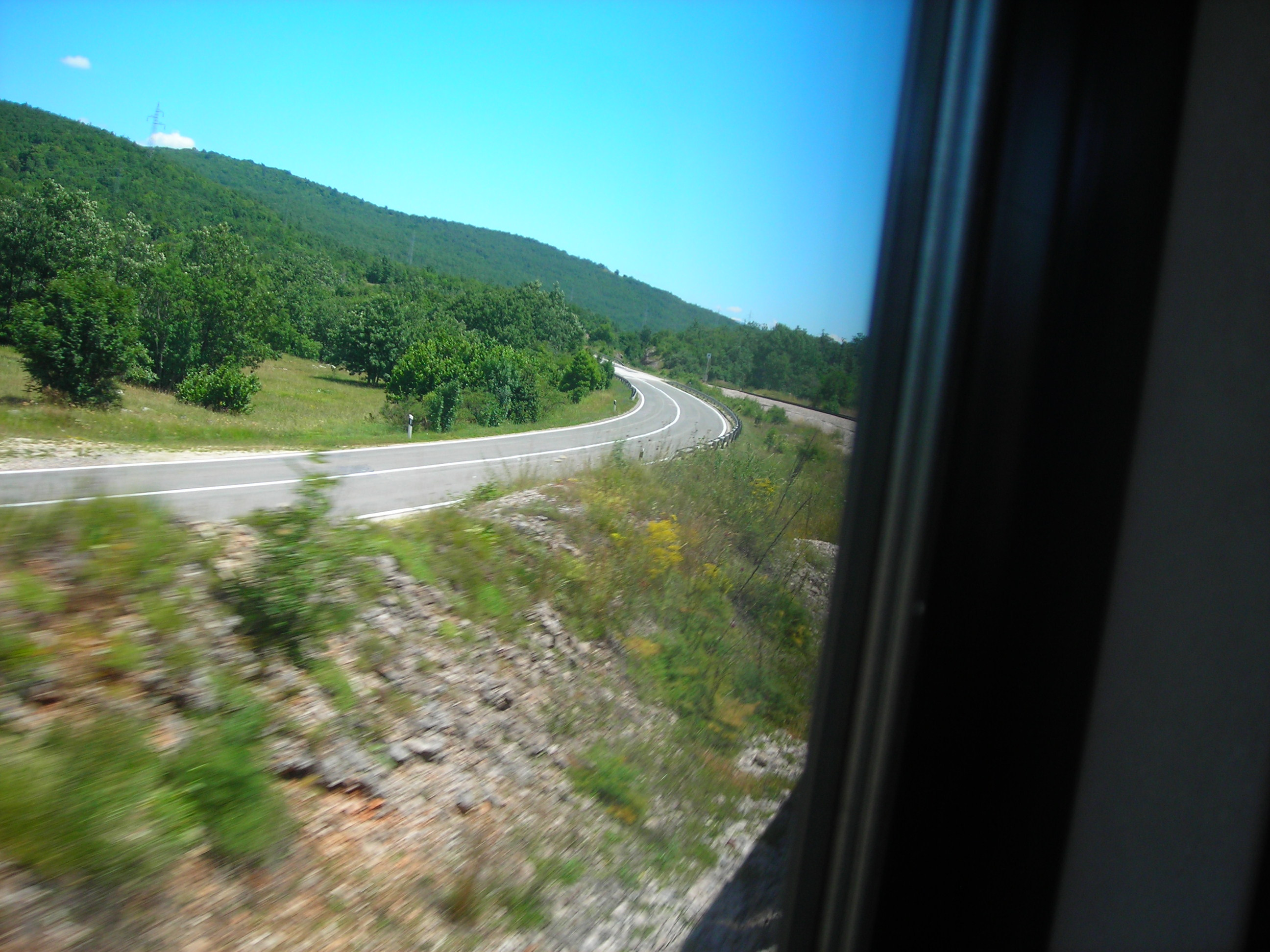
E71 as Croatian D1 state road, near Knin

The E71 route through Croatia starts at the Zrinski Bridge and the Goričan border crossing at the northern terminus of the A4 motorway near Čakovec and reaches Ivanja Reka interchange where it defaults to the westbound A3 motorway and proceeds to Lučko interchange, where the E71 switches to the A1 motorway. In that area the E71 reaches Zagreb and connects to the city through a number of interchanges along the Zagreb bypass. Along the three motorways, the E71 is concurrent with the E65, and in the A3 motorway section of the E71, the route is also concurrent with the European route E70. The E71 route diverges from the A1 motorway at Karlovac interchange and switches to the D1 state road passing through Karlovac towards Plitvice Lakes, switches to the D217 and reaches Ličko Petrovo Selo/Izačić border crossing to Bosnia and Herzegovina. It further specifies that the E71 runs through Bihać, Bosnia and Herzegovina and back to Croatian border, passing via Užljebić border crossing and D218 state road to Otrić, where the E71 rejoins the D1 state road running to Split via Podi interchange with the A1 motorway. All the Croatian state road sections of the E71 and the E71 sections in Bosnia and Herzegovina consist of two-lane roads with at-grade intersections except for the northernmost section of the D1/E71 concurrency running through Karlovac, and the final 12 kilometres (7.5 miles) of the D1/E71 concurrency between the Podi interchange (A1 motorway) and Split, both of which are executed as expressways. Southbound E71 traffic reaching Split defaults to the D8 state road.

=== New route variant ===
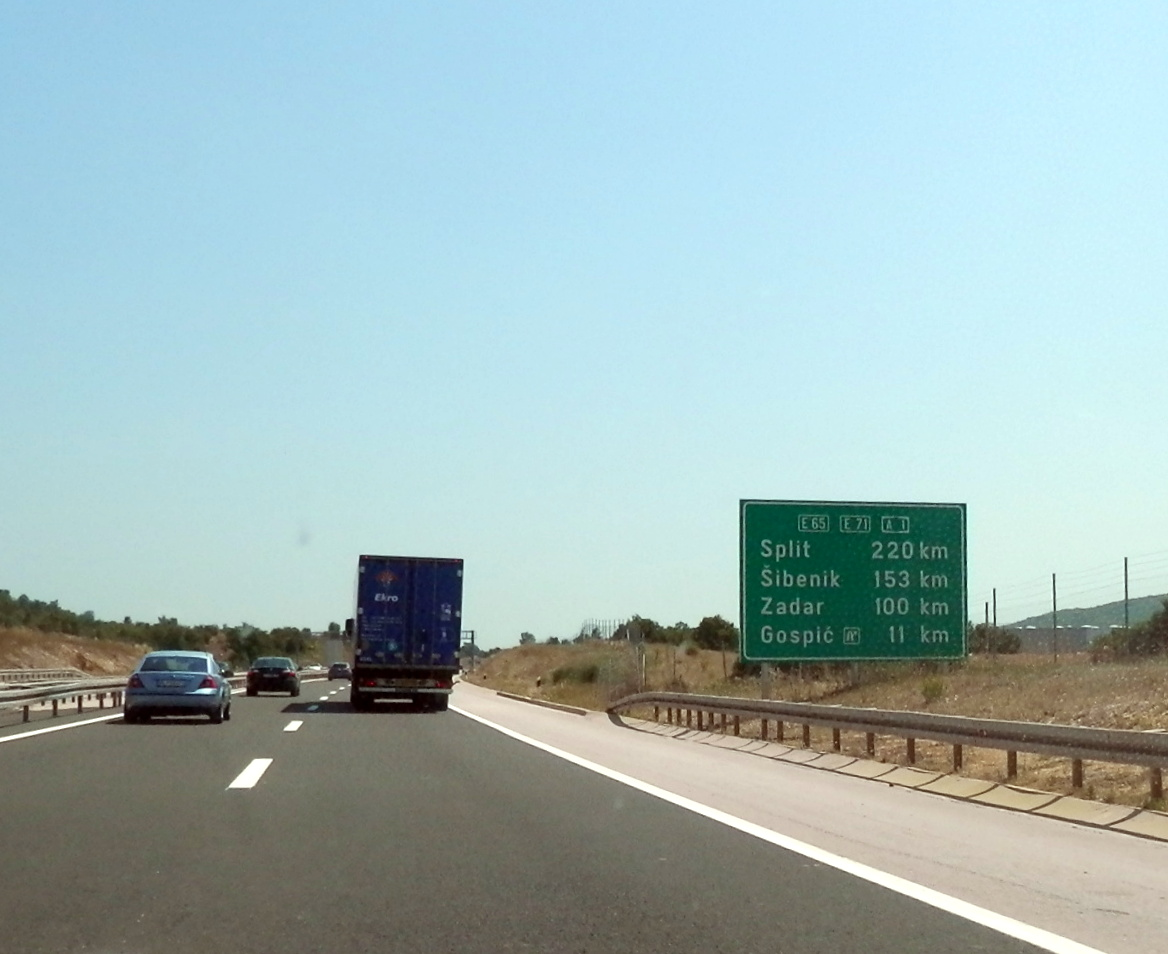
Croatian A1 motorway signposted as E71, near Gospić

In Croatia, the A1 motorway is signposted as the E71 from Karlovac all the way south to the Dugopolje interchange connecting to the Podi interchange of the D1, deviating from the United Nations Economic Commission for Europe (UNECE) specification of the route. This is also observed on roads connecting to the A1 between Karlovac and Dugopolje, as well as on large proportion of maps and major route planning software. The E71 route through Croatia, conforming to the UNECE specification, is 448 km (278 mi) long, and the section in Bosnia and Herzegovina is 28 km (17 mi) long.

== Toll ==
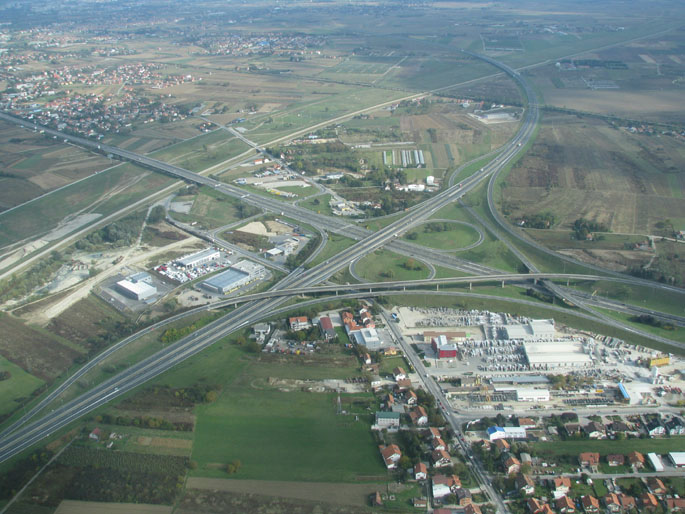
Lučko interchange, carrying the E71 near Zagreb

Various sections of the E71 are tolled, using a range of toll collection systems. Motorways in Hungary are tolled using an electronic toll collection (ETC) system with charges differing for various categories of vehicles and length of period when the e-vignette is valid. A notable exception is the M0 motorway of which some sections are not tolled. Croatian motorways are also generally tolled, using a ticket system. All sections of the A1 motorway are tolled, but those A4 sections south of Sveta Helena interchange and the A3 sections concurrent with the E71 are not tolled as they are a part of the Zagreb bypass. As of August 2011, the toll charged along the Croatian section of the E71 route between various toll plazas at each motorway exit and two mainline toll plazas, varies depending on the length of route travelled and the vehicle classification in Croatia. The toll is payable in euros and by major credit and debit cards. A prepaid ETC system is also used.

== History ==
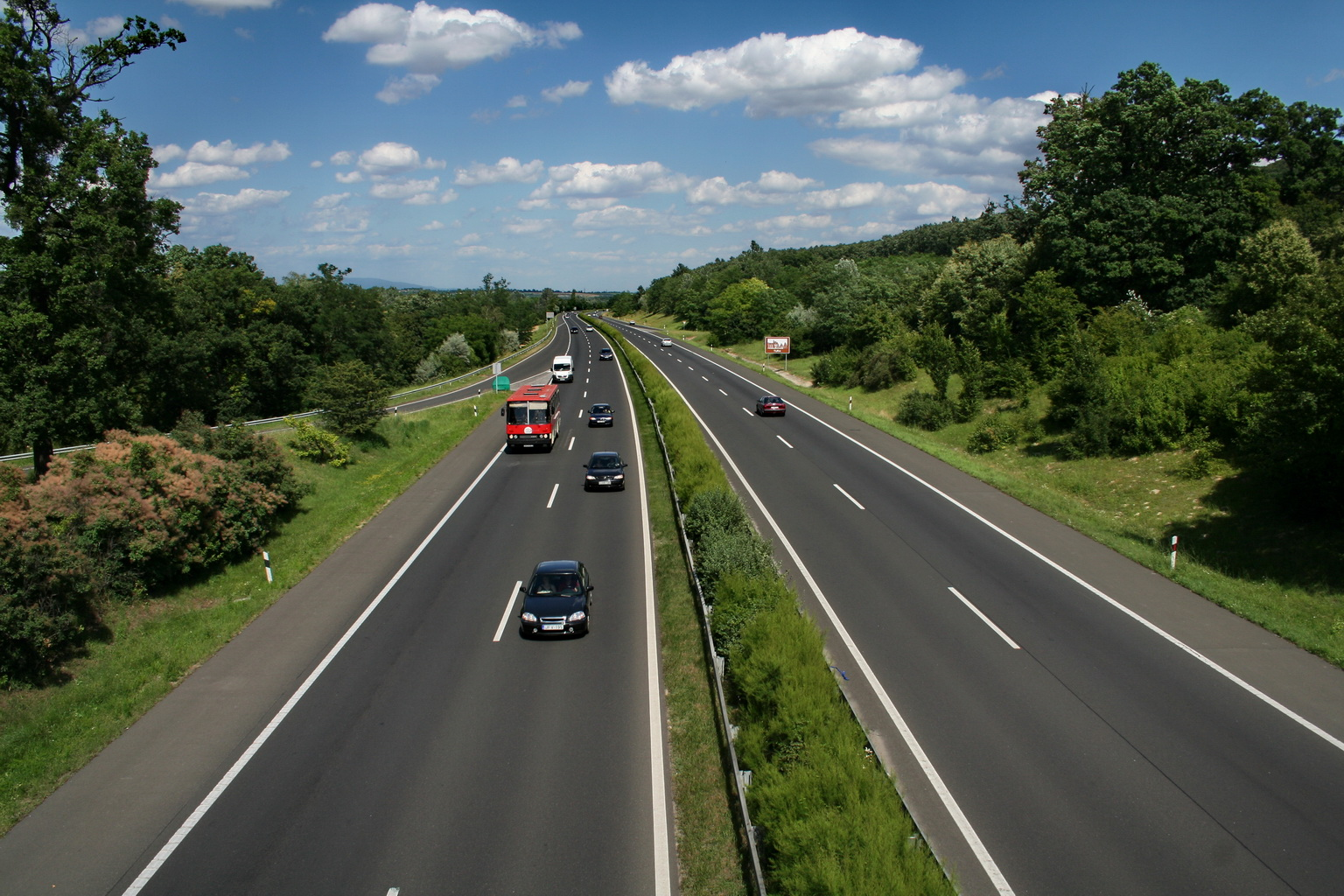
E71 as M3 motorway near Bag, Hungary

UNECE was formed in 1947, and their first major act to improve transportation was a joint UN declaration no. 1264, the Declaration on the Construction of Main International Traffic Arteries, signed in Geneva on September 16, 1950, which defined the first E-road network. This declaration was amended several times before November 15, 1975, when it was replaced by the European Agreement on Main International Traffic Arteries or "AGR", which set up a route numbering system and improved standards for roads in the list. The AGR went through several changes, with the last one, as of 2011, in 2008. Reorganization of the E-roads network of 1975 and 1983 redefined the E71 designation previously associated with Hanover–Bremen–Bremerhaven road and assigned it to Košice–Budapest–Zagreb route. The same documents assigned the Zagreb–Bihać–Split section to the E59, as the E71 terminated in Zagreb at the time, however, the most recent revision of the E-network truncated the E59 in Zagreb, and transferred its former southern leg to the E71, extending the E71 considerably.

Since the E71 route was first defined between Košice and Zagreb, efforts were made to improve the roads connecting the two cities to Budapest. In the 1970s, Hungary started construction of the M7 as its first motorway, and Zagreb–Karlovac section of the A1 motorway was completed in Croatia (within Yugoslavia at the time), representing the first sections of the present-day E71 to become a modern road traffic route, and the first modern motorways in Hungary and Croatia respectively. Subsequently, the two motorways, as well as other along the route in Croatia and Hungary, were gradually extended towards national borders, as well as to bypass capitals of the two nations—Budapest and Zagreb. Croatian and Hungarian motorways spanning the E71 route linked up in 2008.

=== Planned development ===
Currently, the E71 section in Slovakia now signposted as the route 68 is being upgraded to an expressway already designated as R4 expressway, while the Hungarian M30 motorway was scheduled to be extended north to the Slovak border. In the autumn of 2021 the M30 motorway opened for the whole length from the Slovak border to Miskolc. The R4 expressway was completed in February 2013 and the section between Košice south and the D1 was completed in September 2025. As of August 2011, the Croatian section of the E71 south of Karlovac is not planned to be upgraded substantially as there already is the A1 motorway running parallel to the designated E71 route via Zadar rather than Bihać. The A1 section is even physically signposted as the E71. Likewise, there are no plans to perform any upgrades to the E71 in Bosnia and Herzegovina in existence as of 2011. Still, there are proposals to upgrade the route, possibly connecting Bihać to Zagreb via Sisak rather than Karlovac, made from time to time in Bosnia and Herzegovina and in Croatia. The E71 route, especially its Budapest–Zagreb–Karlovac section was given further importance in June 1997 at the Pan-European Transport Conference in Helsinki, when the section was made a part of the Pan-European Corridor Vb, spanning Budapest and Rijeka via Zagreb.

== Itinerary ==
The E 71 routes through four European countries:

- Slovakia
  - R4: Košice - Milhosť
- Hungary
  - M30: Tornyosnémeti - Miskolc (Start of Concurrency of E79) - Mezőcsát
  - M3: Mezőcsát (End of Concurrency of E79) - Gyöngyös - Gödöllő
  - M31: Gödöllő - Budapest
  - M0: Budapest bypass ( E60 E73 E75 E77)
  - M7: Budapest ( E60 E75) - Székesfehérvár ( E66) - Balatonszentgyörgy ( E661) - Nagykanizsa (Start of Concurrency with E65) - Letenye ( E653)
- Croatia
  - A4: Goričan - Zagreb ( E70)
  - A3: Zagreb bypass ( E59 E70)
  - A1: Zagreb ( E59 E70) - Karlovac - Bosiljevo (End of Concurrency with E65) - Josipdol - Žuta Lokva (Start of Concurrency with E65) - Zadar - Split (End of Concurrency with E65)
  - D1: Split ( E65)

(Route officially goes through Bihać, Bosnia and Herzegovina, but is signed via Gospić, Croatia)

== See also ==
- European long-distance paths
- Road transport
- Transport in Bosnia and Herzegovina
- Motorways in Croatia
- Motorways in Hungary
- Highways in Slovakia
