= R4 expressway (Slovakia) =

Expressway in Slovakia

Expressway R4
- Rýchlostná cesta R4
- Completed Under construction Planned

Route information
- Part of E50 E58 E71 E371
- Length: 88.4 km (54.9 mi) Completed: 23.1 km (14.4 mi); Under Construction: 10.2 km (6.3 mi); Planned: 65.3 km (40.6 mi) />The lengths are stated without concurrences

Major junctions
- From: S19 border with Poland (planned)
- D1 Prešov, West; D1 near Košické Oľšany; R2 near Haniska (planned)
- To: M30 border with Hungary

Location
- Country: Slovakia
- Regions: Prešov Region, Košice Region
- Major cities: Prešov, Košice

Highway system
- Highways in Slovakia
← R3	→ R5

R4 expressway (Slovak: Rýchlostná cesta R4) is an expressway in the north–south direction in eastern Slovakia. Initially planned to be completed in 2023, the completed 130 kilometres (81 mi) long expressway will connect the state border of Poland to the border with Hungary, passing Svidník, Prešov and Košice.

On the Polish side, the R4 will be connected to the S19 expressway; on the Hungarian side, to the M30 motorway. The section between Prešov and Košické Oľšany is shared with D1, and sections between Košické Oľšany and Haniska with R2. The road is part of the proposed Via Carpatia route.

== Chronology ==
This corridor was initially included in the expressway network and thus also in the construction plans as early as 1963, by the resolution of the Government of the Czechoslovak Socialist Republic No. 286/1963. At that time, it was included as a combination of the motorway No. 73 in the section from Vyšný Komárnik to Prešov, and the motorway No. 68 in the section from Košice to the border with Hungary.

After 1999, as part of the overall reorganisation of the expressway network and their renumbering, the corridor started to be referred to as the R4 expressway. Construction of the first section of the road did not begin until 2007, more than forty years after the first planning of a capacity road in this corridor. The Svidník bypass (Ladomirová – Svidník-juh) at a length of 4.6 kilometres (2.9 mi), in a half profile was put into operation at the end of 2010.

In 2013, the 14.2 kilometres (8.8 mi) long section between south of Košice and the border with Hungary at Milhosť was put into operation, with Skanska as the sole contractor, constructing the section since 2010. The section received EUR 45 million in subsidies from the European Union.

In July 2019, Vahostav-SK was tendered to begin construction on Stage I of the Prešov northern bypass. The 3.5 kilometres (2.2 mi) long section was opened in October 2023.

The construction began on a 14.3 kilometres (8.9 mi) section between Košické Oľšany and Haniska in March 2022, aimed to provide a shared section with the R2. The section was put into operation in September 2025.

=== Future developments ===
Stage II of the Prešov bypass is currently under construction. The first preparatory work is being carried out. Once complete, the R4 will expand by a 10.2 kilometres (6.3 mi) long section around Prešov. The section will include twelve bridge structures of various lengths and the approximately 1.9 kilometres (1.2 mi) long Okruhliak tunnel. Construction on the section between Kapušany and Vyšny komarnik is predicted to start in 2027 and end in 2031 according to the ministry of transport.

== Route description ==
Country	Region	Location	km	mi	Exit	Name	Destinations	Notes
Slovakia	Presov region, Kosice region	Slovakia	0	0.0		Vyšný Komárnik-Barwinek border crossing	S 19 E371	Kilometrage starting point Road continues as the Polish S19 Set to be built from 2027 to 2031
Slovakia	Presov region, Kosice region	Slovakia			Rest area	Vyšný Komárnik		Set to be built from 2027 to 2031
Slovakia	Presov region, Kosice region	Slovakia	1	0.62		Vyšný Komárnik	I/21	Set to be built from 2027 to 2031
Slovakia	Presov region, Kosice region	Slovakia	8	5.0		Hunkovce	I/21	Set to be built from 2027 to 2031
Slovakia	Presov region, Kosice region	Slovakia	16	9.9		Svidník-sever	I/21	In operation in a half profile (second profile to be built from 2027 to 2031)
Slovakia	Presov region, Kosice region	Slovakia	21	13		Svidník-juh	I/21	In operation in a half profile (second profile to be built from 2027 to 2031)
Slovakia	Presov region, Kosice region	Slovakia	25	16		Stročín	I/21	Set to be built from 2027 to 2031
Slovakia	Presov region, Kosice region	Slovakia	30	19		Radoma	I/21	Set to be built from 2027 to 2031
Slovakia	Presov region, Kosice region	Slovakia	34	21		Giraltovce	I/21	Set to be built from 2027 to 2031
Slovakia	Presov region, Kosice region	Slovakia	40	25		Kukova	I/21	Set to be built from 2027 to 2031
Slovakia	Presov region, Kosice region	Slovakia	65	40		Lipníky	I/18 I/21	Set to be built from 2027 to 2031
Slovakia	Presov region, Kosice region	Slovakia	70	43		Kapušany	I/18	In construction
Slovakia	Presov region, Kosice region	Slovakia	81	50		Prešov-sever	I/68	
Slovakia	Presov region, Kosice region	Slovakia	86	53		Prešov-západ	D1 E50	Concurrency with D1
Slovakia	Presov region, Kosice region	Slovakia	92	57		Prešov-juh	I/68	Concurrency with D1
Slovakia	Presov region, Kosice region	Slovakia	103	64		Lemešany		Concurrency with D1
Slovakia	Presov region, Kosice region	Slovakia			Rest area	Janovík		Concurrency with D1
Slovakia	Presov region, Kosice region	Slovakia	112	70		Budimír, Košice-sever	I/20	Concurrency with D1
Slovakia	Presov region, Kosice region	Slovakia	118	73		Košice-východ (Košické Oľšany)	D1 E50 R2 E71	Concurrency with D1
Slovakia	Presov region, Kosice region	Slovakia	119	74		Košice-východ (Hrašovík)	I/19	Concurrency with R2
Slovakia	Presov region, Kosice region	Slovakia	127	79		Košice-Krásna	II/552	Opened 09/2025
Slovakia	Presov region, Kosice region	Slovakia	132	82		Košice-juh	I/17	
Slovakia	Presov region, Kosice region	Slovakia	133	83		Košice-juh	R2 E58	Currently awaiting signed contract for construction to start
Slovakia	Presov region, Kosice region	Slovakia	143	89		Kechnec		
Slovakia	Presov region, Kosice region	Slovakia	145	90		Milhosť-Tornyosnémeti border crossing	M30 E71	Kilometrage end point Road continues as Hungarian M30
1.000 mi = 1.609 km; 1.000 km = 0.621 mi: Proposed; Route transition; Unopened

== See also ==
- Controlled-access highway
- Highways in Slovakia
- Transport in Slovakia
