= E79 =

E79 may refer to:

- European route E79
- King's Indian Defense, Encyclopaedia of Chess Openings code
