= Via Carpathia =

Transnational motorway in Europe

- Via Carpatia

Route information
- Existed: 2006–present

Major junctions
- North end: Klaipėda, Lithuania
- South end: Thessaloniki, Greece

Location
- Countries: Lithuania, Poland, Slovakia, Hungary, Romania, Bulgaria, Greece

Highway system

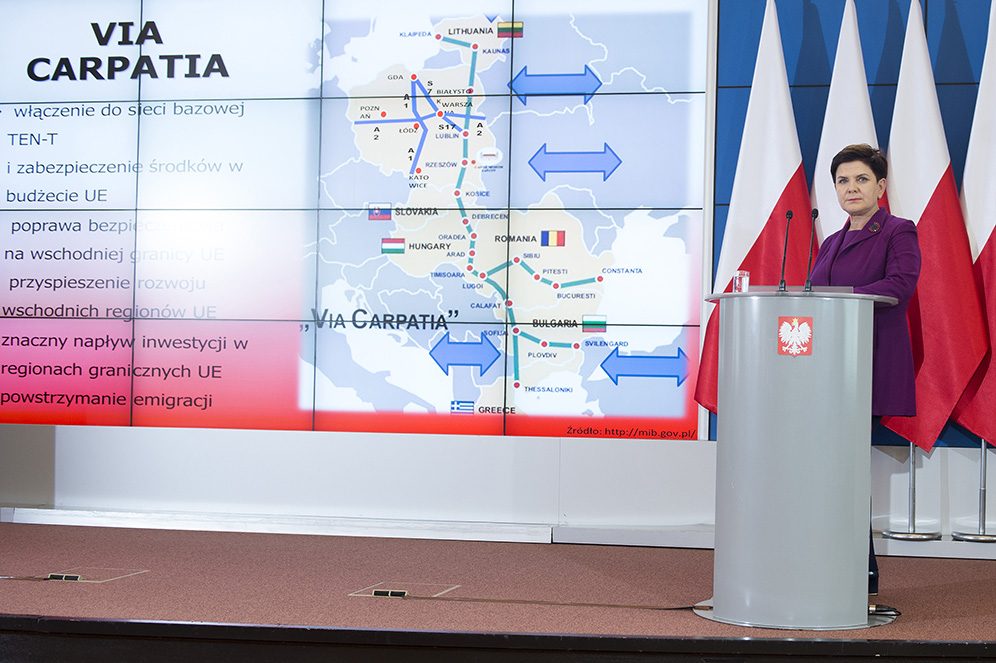
Beata Szydło presenting Via Carpatia in 2016

Via Carpathia (also Via Carpatia) is a transnational highway network under construction, connecting Klaipėda in Lithuania with Thessaloniki in Greece. The route largely runs through the Carpathian Mountains, hence its name. The Polish part of Via Carpatia was named in 2021 after the late President Lech Kaczyński.

== History ==
The route was initially agreed upon in 2006 by Lithuania, Poland, Slovakia, and Hungary. In 2010, this group was joined by Romania, Bulgaria, and Greece, who signed the so-called Łańcut Declaration. On 22 June 2017, Poland and Ukraine signed a cooperation agreement for the construction of the road. Signatories indicated the road could be part of the Trans-European Transport Network (TEN-T). Construction is ongoing in individual sections. While initially planned to open fully around 2025, delays in complex mountain sections (particularly in southern Poland and Romania) have pushed the expected completion of the entire corridor to approximately 2030.

The status of key sections as of late 2025:

=== Branch 1 ===
- Poland:
  - S19 Expressway: The Lublin–Rzeszów section is completed. The southern section from Rzeszów to the Slovak border (Barwinek) is under heavy construction (including tunnels), with completion expected around 2027. Northern sections (Lublin–Białystok) are partially under construction.
  - S61 Expressway: Completed, serving as the connection to the Baltic States (Via Baltica).
- Hungary:
  - M30 motorway: Fully completed. The section opened to the public in October 2021, linking Miskolc to the Slovak border.
- Slovakia:
  - R4 expressway: The northern bypass of Prešov (Stage II) is under construction. The section from Prešov to the Polish border is largely in the planning/tender stage.
- Romania:
  - A6 motorway: Western part (Calafat to Lugoj) is planned.
  - A7 motorway (Moldavia Motorway): Major sections under construction, serving as a key part of the corridor.
  - New Europe Bridge over the Danube: Operational.
- Bulgaria:
  - Botevgrad-Vidin expressway: Parts under construction.
  - Struma motorway: Partially completed.

=== Branch 2 ===
- A1 motorway in Romania: The mountain section (Sibiu–Pitești) is under construction (expected completion ~2028).
- A0 motorway: Bucharest Ring Road (South) completed.
- A2 motorway: Completed (Bucharest to Constanța).

== Route description ==
The road will run in a general north–south direction through central Europe from the Baltic Sea to the Aegean Sea. Its northern terminus is the Lithuanian port city of Klaipėda. In Kaunas it will connect with the Via Baltica and the route to Ełk will be shared. From Ełk, the route leads to Białystok and continues through eastern Poland, eastern Slovakia, eastern Hungary, western Romania, western Bulgaria, and further to Greece. Its southern terminus is the Greek port city of Thessaloniki. A fork in the south may continue eastwards through Romania to the Black Sea port town of Constanța, and the next branching to the Bulgarian-Turkish border Svilengrad-Edirne.

== See also ==
- Three Seas Initiative
- European route E79
- New Europe Bridge
- Rail-2-Sea
