= Lajos Kossuth Elementary School =

Coordinates: 47°59′32″N 20°50′10″E

Address
- Kossuth street 54/b Nyékládháza; Hungary

Information
- Established: 1978; 47 years ago
- Principal: Miklós Marján
- Enrollment: 435 (2011)

Lajos Kossuth Elementary School is an educational institute with eight grades located in Nyékládháza, Hungary. The principal is Miklós (Michael) Marján.

== History ==
The school was founded by the local government of Nyékládháza City in 1978.

== Educational activity ==
In 2011 the number of indentured students was 435. There are 19 classes, 9 lower schools and 10 upper schools.

Talent care

Within schedule: foreign language groups in English and German from 3rd grade to 8th grade and high level mathematics from 4th grade
Freetime programs: preparatory classes in Hungarian Literature and in Mathematics for the 8th graders
Art courses with the help of art schools
Ede Reményi Elementary Musical Institute
Six instruments: piano, guitar, tuba, flute, and trumpet
Karakter Elementary Art Institute
Standard dance and Hungarian folk dance
ISK special classes: talent care and ensuring the daily exercise of the students
Sports: football, handball, karate, table tennis, and archery
