= Main road 304 (Hungary) =

Road in Hungary

Main road 304
- 304-es főút

Route information
- Length: 3.5 km (2.2 mi)
- History: 2004–2005

Major junctions
- From: 3 in Görömböly
- To: M30 in Miskolc-dél

Location
- Country: Hungary
- Counties: Borsod-Abaúj-Zemplén
- Major cities: Miskolc

Highway system
- Roads in Hungary; Highways; Main roads; Local roads

The Main road 304 is a short bypass direction Secondary class main road near Miskolc, that connects the Main road 3 to the M30 motorway's Miskolc-dél junction. The road is 3.5 kilometres (2.2 mi) long.

The road, as well as all other main roads in Hungary, is managed and maintained by Magyar Közút, state owned company.

== See also ==
- Roads in Hungary
