= Rail-2-Sea =

Project for building a railway connecting Gdańsk in Poland with Constanța in Romania

Location map of Gdańsk and Constanța in Europe. The Rail-2-Sea project would connect these cities with a railway.

Rail-2-Sea is a project of the Three Seas Initiative (3SI) that envisions developing and modernizing a 3,663 kilometres (2,276 miles) long railway line connecting the Polish Baltic Sea port of Gdańsk with the Romanian Black Sea port of Constanța. This railway would pass through Romania, Hungary, Slovakia and Poland and it aims to improve the infrastructure of these countries, although it will also have a civilian and military use. It may also have implications for 5G technology. All these countries are members of the European Union (EU) and NATO, and Poland and Romania in particular are the closest allies of the United States in the region, reason for which this country has expressed support for the project.

In Romania, this railway will have 3 branches: Nordic A (passing through cities like Cluj-Napoca, Sighișoara and Brașov), Nordic B (passing through cities like Arad, Deva, Alba Iulia, Sighișoara and Brașov) and Southern (passing through cities like Timișoara, Caransebeș, Orșova and Craiova). All these branches start at the Romanian border with Hungary and pass through Bucharest and finally Constanța. According to the 3SI's official website, the Rail-2-Sea project will be complete by 2029.

== See also ==
- Via Carpathia
