= József Lenz =

Hungarian fruit distributor

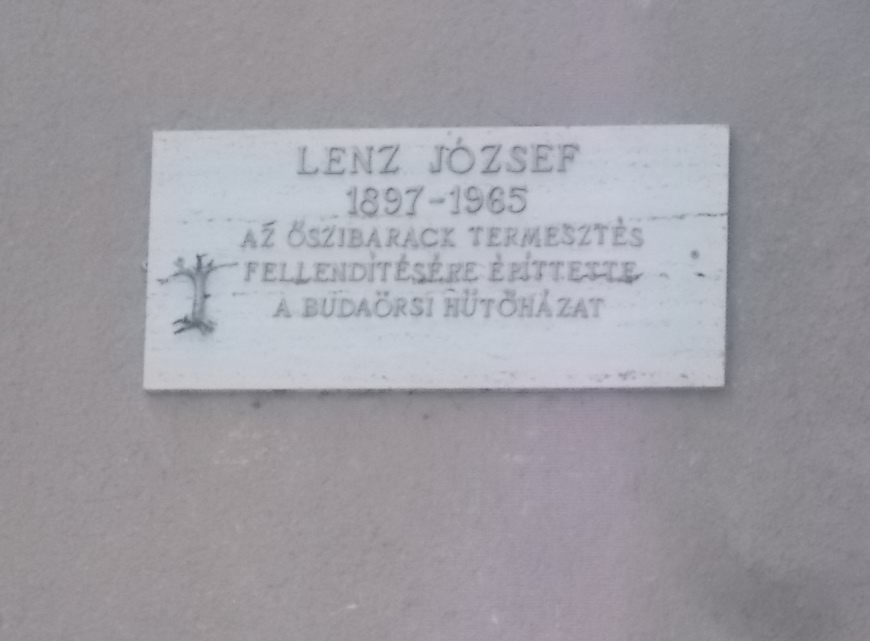

Personal details
- Born: March 18, 1897; Budapest, Austria-Hungary
- Died: March 14, 1965 (aged 67); Bogotá, Colombia
- Profession: Hungarian fruit distributor, hussar captain, commercial counselor

József Lenz (March 18, 1897 – March 14, 1965) was a commercial counselor, Hungarian Fruit Distributor, tradesman of exotic fruits, reserve hussar captain, decorated with the Order of Pro Ecclesia et Pontifice, Chairman of the National Association of Fruit of Hungary, Vegetable and Food Traders of Hungary, Chairman of the Fruit Exporters and Importers Association of Hungary, member of the Hungarian Trade Statistics and Valuation Committee, and Vice-President of the "Association of Merchants of Fruits of Hungary", member of the organizing committee of the "Hungarian Fruit Export Association", tenement house owner, landowner in Nyékládháza, Bükkaranyos and Kesznyéten, art collector.

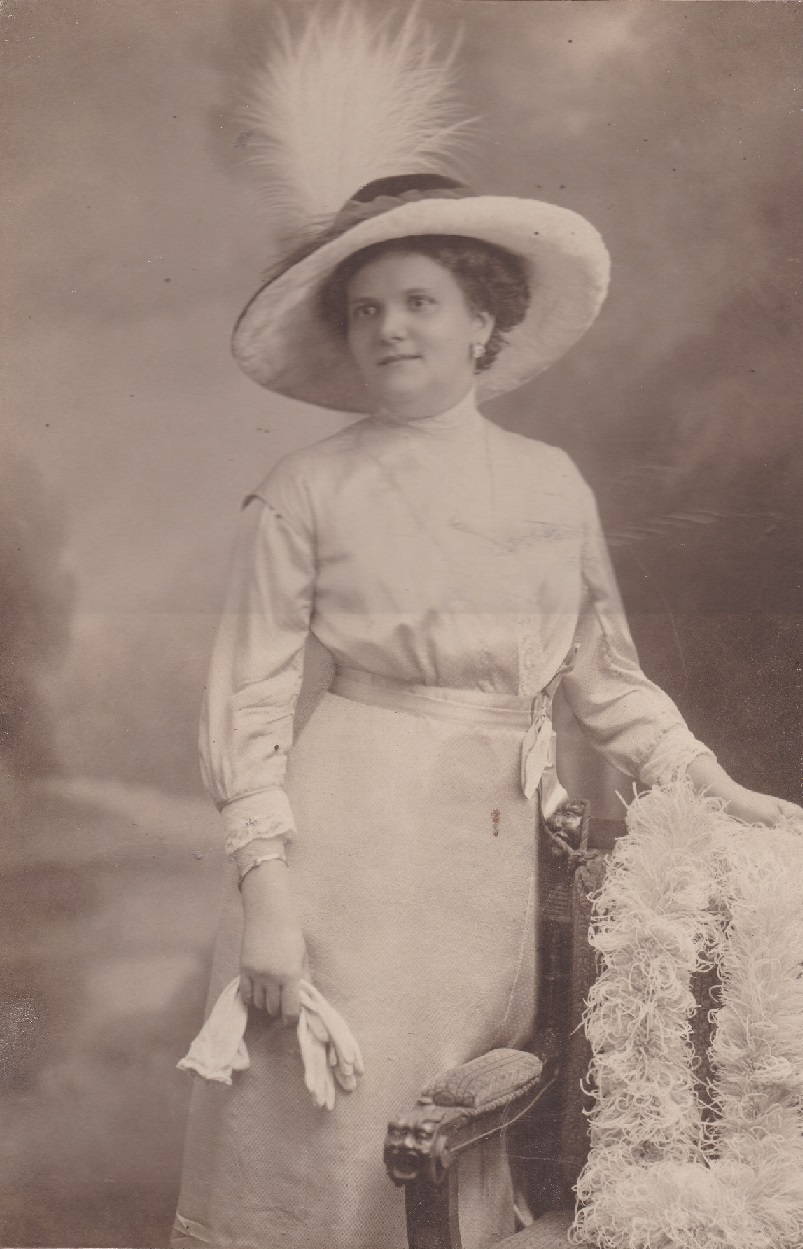
Anna Gömöry (1874–1946), fruit trader, wife of Gyula Lenz (1848–1910), mother of József Lenz.

== Biography ==
He was born in a wealthy Roman Catholic bourgeois family in Budapest, in the former Kingdom of Hungary. His ancestors can be traced back to the ancient Lenz family, which was member of the Swiss Bourgeoisie of Lenzburg. A branch of that family moved to Hungary and lived for several centuries in Pressburg, where they lived for about two centuries and then moved to Budapest around 1864. József Lenz was born on March 18, 1897, in Budapest. His father was Gyula Lenz (1848–1910), a wealthy Hungarian tradesman of exotic fruits, tenement house owner, and his mother was Anna Mária Etelka Gömöry (1874–1946), fruits tradeswoman. József lenz had two uncles, János Lenz (1843–1913), tradesman, Knight of the Order of Franz Joseph, and Ferenc Lenz (1851–1926), tradesman commercial counselor of the Kingdom, tenement house owners. The three Lenz brothers Gyula, János and Ferenc founded the southern fruits and spices (Südfrüchte Händler) trading company in 1864. In the following decade they acquired several buildings in Budapest, which were used as tenement houses that engrossed the capital of the family along the fruit trading company. According to the tax levies of the winter of 1935, Anna Gömöry the widow of Gyula Lenz, was the 6th higher taxpayer in Budapest, and one of the wealthiest person in the city.

On January 8, 1920, József Lenz married the Roman Catholic Klara Topits (1901–1993) in Budapest; she was the daughter of a wealthy family of the Bourgeoisie of the city of Pest. Klára Topits' father was Alajos József Topits (1855–1926), owner and director of the pasta factory "Son of Joseph Topits" (in Hungarian: Topits József fia), located in Budapest, which was the first pasta factory of the Kingdom of Hungary founded on 1859 by Klára's grandfather József Topits (1824-1876); Alajos Topits was also member of the Hungarian National Industry Council, Knight of the Order of Franz Joseph, and tenement house owner in Budapest. The paternal grandmother of Klára Topits was Klára Prückler (1833-1907), wife of József Topits (1824-1876); she was also member of a wealthy Roman Catholic family of the Bourgeoisie of the city of Pest. Klára Prückler's uncle was Ignác Prückler (1809-1876), founder and owner of the "Ignácz Prückler, Hungary's first rum, liqueur and champagne factory", the first Champagne and liqueur factory of the Kingdom of Hungary founded in 1834 in Budapest.

József Lenz was famous in Hungary between the two World Wars, not only for his wealth, but also for his persistent struggle and activities to protect Hungarian products during the Great Depression. Thanks to him, Hungarian products became known in Central Europe, and as a result of his activities, the economic crisis became more bearable in Hungary. In this lands the welfare situation of maids was exemplary. For example, in Nyékládháza, they built 25 modern flats in high-rise, reinforced concrete houses that they eventually got after long years of service at the company. He built the Roman Catholic neo-Gothic church in the village of Nyékládháza in 1943 and donating it to the people of the town. Gyula Czapik the Archbishop of Eger himself, who, after the ceremony, handed over the "Pro Ecclesia et Pontifice Order of Honor" to Jozsef Lenz. On the other hand, he gave scholarships to several students of the Budapest Piarist High School (This initiative was known as the "Lenz József Foundation").

The bankruptcy of the country in the early 1930s put import trade in Hungary in a difficult position. In the case of Turkey and Greece, severe compensations had to be made. 95% of the imports were handled by József Lenz. For four years, his company exported an average of a thousand horses a year to Turkey and Greece. In 1933, the Turkish Fig Producers' Association entered into an agreement with the Lenz Brothers for the import of citrus fruit to export 1,500 horses to Turkey in return for consignments of figs and other citrus fruits. Later, however, in 1934, the Lenz Brothers company was granted the right to supply artillery horses by the Turkish army.

In 1937, József Lenz built his cold storehouse in Budaörs, mainly for storing Hungarian peaches. In summer, apricots, plums, etc. used to pre-cool exports. In winter, however, apples were stored in it, averaging 100 wagons a year. He became the greatest promotor and defensor of the famous apricot production in the city. In 1939, immediately after the outbreak of World War II, the Lenz company imported large quantities of important colonial goods such as cocoa beans, pepper, coffee, and tea to Hungary. This provided the care for many months. With stocks running out and at the end of 1941, without foreign exchange, he made compensations for the importation of these items that others could not do without a similar license in principle. At the same time, it also provided a significant part of the country's copper sulphate supply. In 1941, the Lenz Company generated more than one million Swiss francs in net currency for the National Bank by selling Turkish citrus fruits in Switzerland, such as delivering raisins to chocolate factories. He farmed on his 800-acre cadastral acre estate in Nyékládháza for years; He had an orchard of 300 acres in the same place. Two wagons a month exported fattened cattle from Nyékládháza; The sale of Yorkshire sows was already advertised in the newspaper in 1926. József Lenz also owned land in Bükkaranyos, where it had 54 cadastral holdings, in Kesznyét, where it had 935 kh, and Debrecen-Pacon, where it had 281 kh. József Lenz had a total of 1,475 cadastral moons in four settlements.

József Lenz' daughter was Klára Lenz (1924–2013) a Hungarian Gobelin tapestry artist, landowner who emigrated to Venezuela during World War II. She was the wife of the Hungarian nobleman Endre Farkas de Boldogfa (1908–1994), Major of the General Staff of the Hungarian Armies during World War II, who hailed from the noble family Farkas de Boldogfa of the Zala county; he was the son of dr. István Farkas de Boldogfa (1875–1921), jurist, supreme chief magistrate of district of Sümeg (főszolgabíró) in the county of Zala, and the noble lady Erzsébet Persay de Persa (1885—1913).

After the Second World War József Lenz moved with his family to Switzerland where he lived for four years. During his stay there, his youngest son Franz was born in Zürich. Later József Lenz moved with his family first to Venezuela, then he moved to Colombia.

He died March 14, 1965, in Bogotá, Colombia.
