= Main road 27 (Hungary) =

Road in Hungary

Main road 27
- 27-es főút
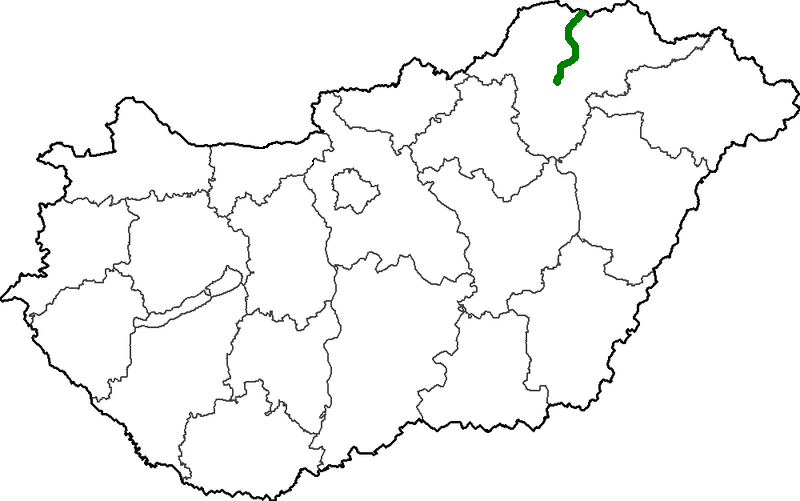

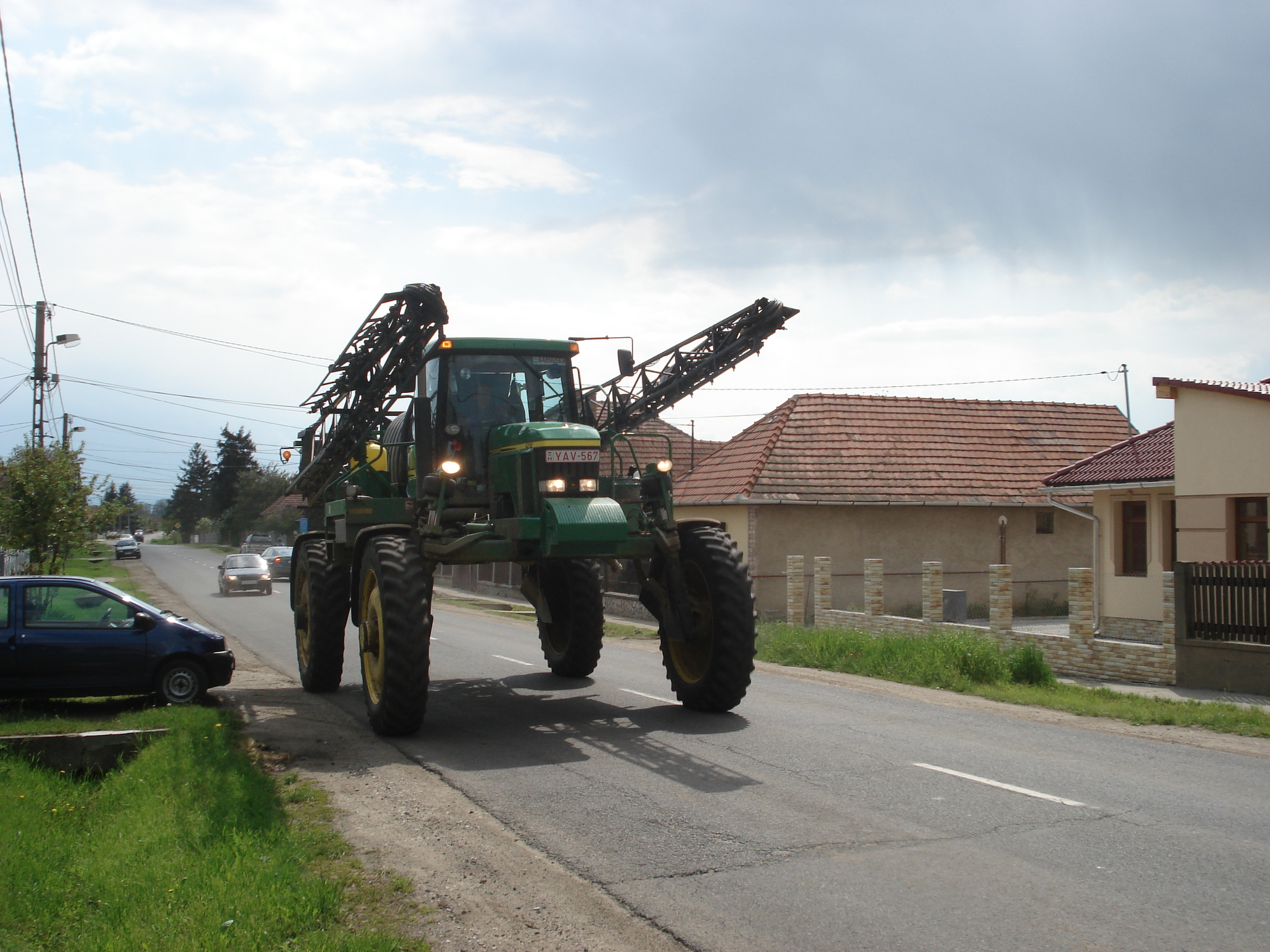

Route information
- Length: 54.6 km (33.9 mi)

Major junctions
- From: 26 in Sajószentpéter
- To: Tornanádaska border with Slovakia

Location
- Country: Hungary
- Counties: Borsod-Abaúj-Zemplén
- Major cities: Sajószentpéter, Edelény, Szendrő

Highway system
- Roads in Hungary; Highways; Main roads; Local roads

Main road 27 is a north–south secondary-class main road in the road in the valley of a Bódva river that connects the Main road 26 to the border of Slovakia. The road is 54.6 kilometres (33.9 mi) long.

The road, as well as all other main roads in Hungary, is managed and maintained by Magyar Közút, state owned company.

== See also ==
- Roads in Hungary
