= Main road 306 (Hungary) =

Road in Hungary

Main road 306
- 306-os főút
- Northern bypass of Miskolc

Route information
- Length: 8 km (5.0 mi)
- History: 2015

Major junctions
- From: M30 in Miskolc-észak
- To: 26 near Szirmabesenyő

Location
- Country: Hungary
- Counties: Borsod-Abaúj-Zemplén
- Major cities: Miskolc

Highway system
- Roads in Hungary; Highways; Main roads; Local roads

The Main road 306 is a short bypass direction Secondary class main road near Miskolc, that connects the M3 motorway's Miskolc-észak junction to the Main road 26. The road is 8 kilometres (5.0 mi) long.

The road, as well as all other main roads in Hungary, is managed and maintained by Magyar Közút, state owned company.

== See also ==
- Roads in Hungary
