= Klára Lenz =

Hungarian artist (1924–2013)

- Born: 30 June 1924; Budapest, Hungary
- Died: 16 February 2013 (aged 88); Madrid, Spain
- Known for: Gobelin tapestry

Klára Mária Hermina Lenz (30 June 1924, in Budapest – 16 February 2013, in Madrid) was a Hungarian Gobelin tapestry artist who emigrated to Venezuela during World War II, and in 1950 moved to Colombia. She was the wife of the Hungarian nobleman Endre Farkas de Boldogfa (1908–1994), Major of the General Staff of the Hungarian Armies during World War II.

== Biography ==
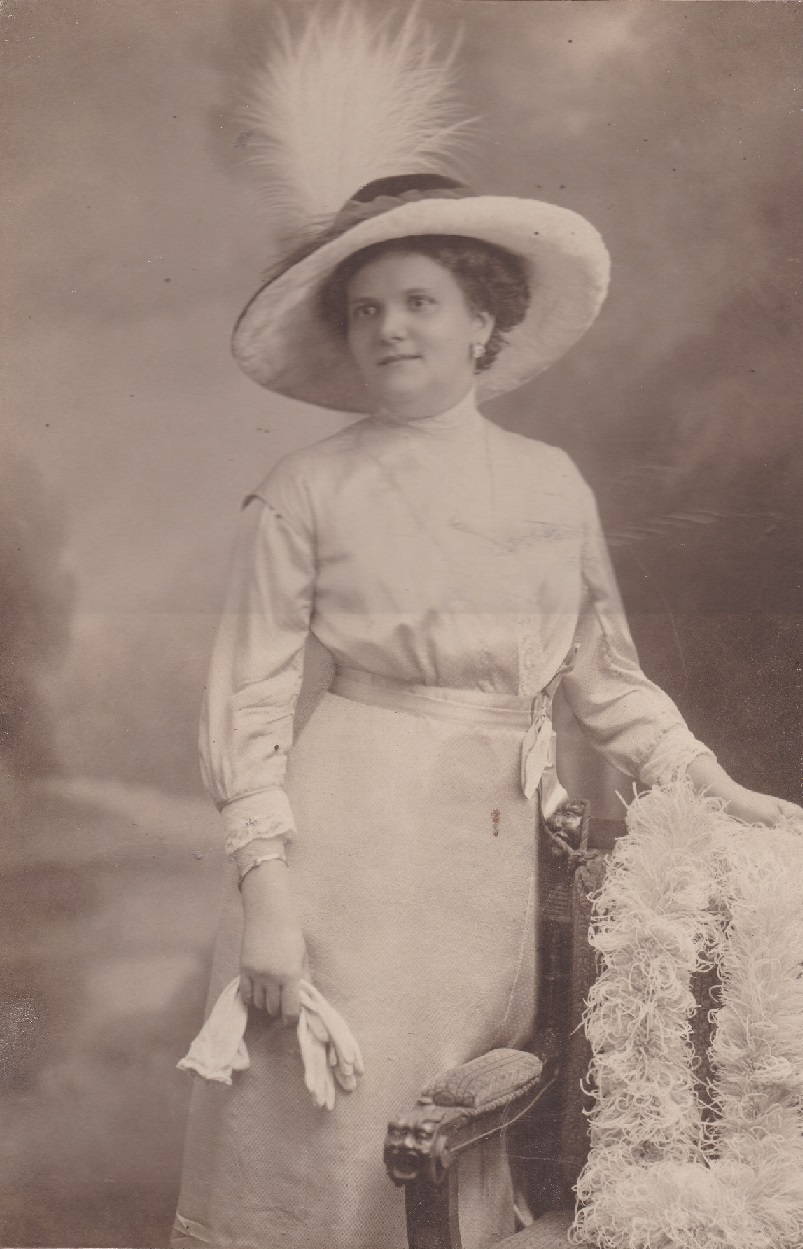
Anna Gömöry (1874–1946), a wealthy fruit trader and owner of several tenement houses in Budapest, wife of Gyula Lenz (1848–1910), the grandmother of Klára Lenz.

She was born in a wealthy Roman Catholic family in Budapest, in the former Kingdom of Hungary. Her ancestors can be traced back to the ancient Lenz family, which was ancient member of the Swiss Bourgeoisie of Lenzburg. A branch of that family moved to Hungary and lived for several centuries in Pressburg. Klara (Clara) Lenz was born on 30 June 1924 in Budapest. Her father was József Lenz (1897–1965), a wealthy Hungarian landowner, tradesman of exotic fruits, Hussar captain of the Royal Hungarian Army. Klára Lenz's mother was Klara Topits (1901–1993), daughter of the member of the high Bourgeoisie of Budapest, Alajos József Topits (1855–1926), owner and director of the pasta factory "Son of Joseph Topits" (in Hungarian: Topits József fia), located in Budapest, also Knight of the Order of Franz Joseph.

On 21 May 1942 Klára Lenz married the Hungarian nobleman Endre Farkas de Boldogfa (1908–1994), Major of the General Staff of the Hungarian Armies during the Second World War. Endre Farkas de Boldogfa was Head of the National Mobility Department at the Ministry of Public Supply during the war. Klára gave birth to two children. Endre hailed from the noble family Farkas de Boldogfa and was the son of dr. István Farkas de Boldogfa (1875–1921), supreme chief magistrate of district of Sümeg (főszolgabíró), and the noble lady Erzsébet Persay de Persa (1885–1913).

After completion of the Second World War, Hungary was invaded by the Soviet armies that fought against Nazi troops after a coup had taken control of the country. Thus, the situation became critical and uncertain, after which József Lenz chose to go with his family to Switzerland. After spending nearly two years in Zurich, the Lenz family moved to Venezuela, where they became naturalized citizens. Klara had started her career working in customer service for United Airlines and at various hotels. She also worked for several decades at the international airport in Bogotá when the family moved to Colombia and also worked for Avianca

The deep catholic artist met through her husband the Hungarian cardinal József Mindszenty, who traveled to Venezuela in 1975 and briefly to Colombia in the same month. Endre Farkas de Boldogfa, knew Mindszenty since his childhood. Endre invited Mindszenty to visit Venezuela and arranged also the trip to Colombia, were Klára and her family received the Hungarian Cardinal.

== Tapestries ==
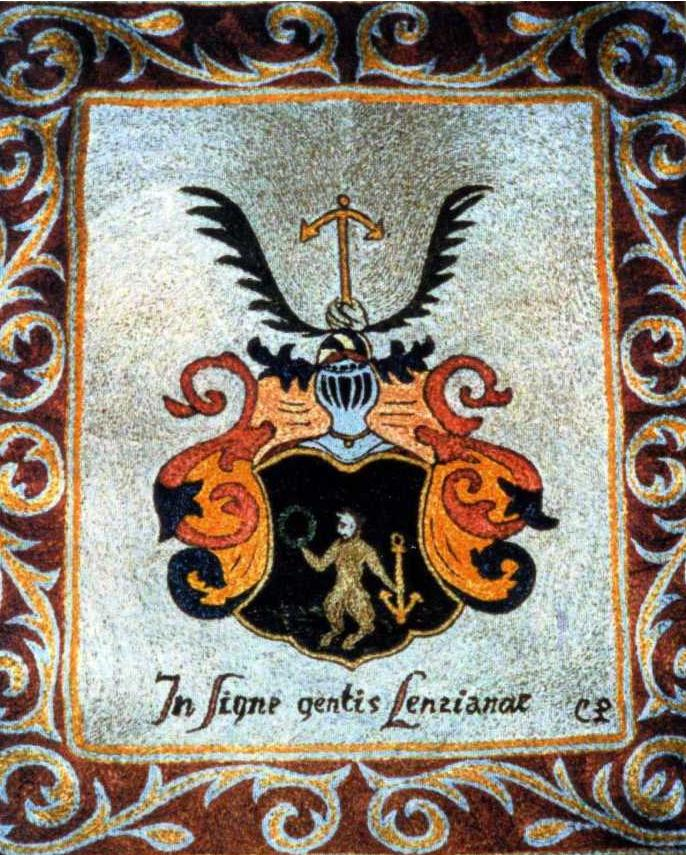
Coat of arms of the Lenz family (embroidered by Klára)

Lenz has created over 100 tapestries while in Bogotá. A museum in Nyékládháza, in Hungary exhibits some of her tapestries as a greater exhibit on the Lenz family.

Klara became very interested in the gods of indigenous cultures of Colombia, Peru, and Mexico, and she reproduced them in many of her works, as well as game animals, mythological animals and birds.
