= Main road 26 (Hungary) =

Road in Hungary

Main road 26
- 26-os főút
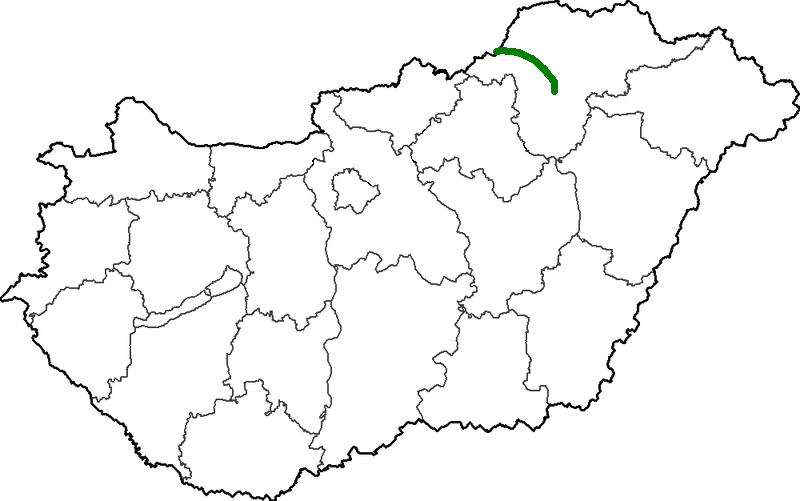

Route information
- Length: 44.6 km (27.7 mi)

Major junctions
- From: 3 in Miskolc
- 306 near Miskolc; 27 in Sajószentpéter; 25 in Bánréve
- To: Bánréve border with Slovakia I/67

Location
- Country: Hungary
- Counties: Borsod-Abaúj-Zemplén
- Major cities: Miskolc, Sajóbábony, Sajószentpéter, Kazincbarcika, Putnok

Highway system
- Roads in Hungary; Highways; Main roads; Local roads

The Main road 26 is an east–west direction Secondary class main road in the road in the valley of a Sajó river, that connects the Main road 3 change to the border of Slovakia. The road is 12.5 kilometres (7.8 mi) long.

The road, as well as all other main roads in Hungary, is managed and maintained by Magyar Közút, state owned company.

== See also ==
- Roads in Hungary
