= Košické Oľšany =

Village and municipality in Slovakia

Košické Oľšany Kassaolcsvár
- Municipality
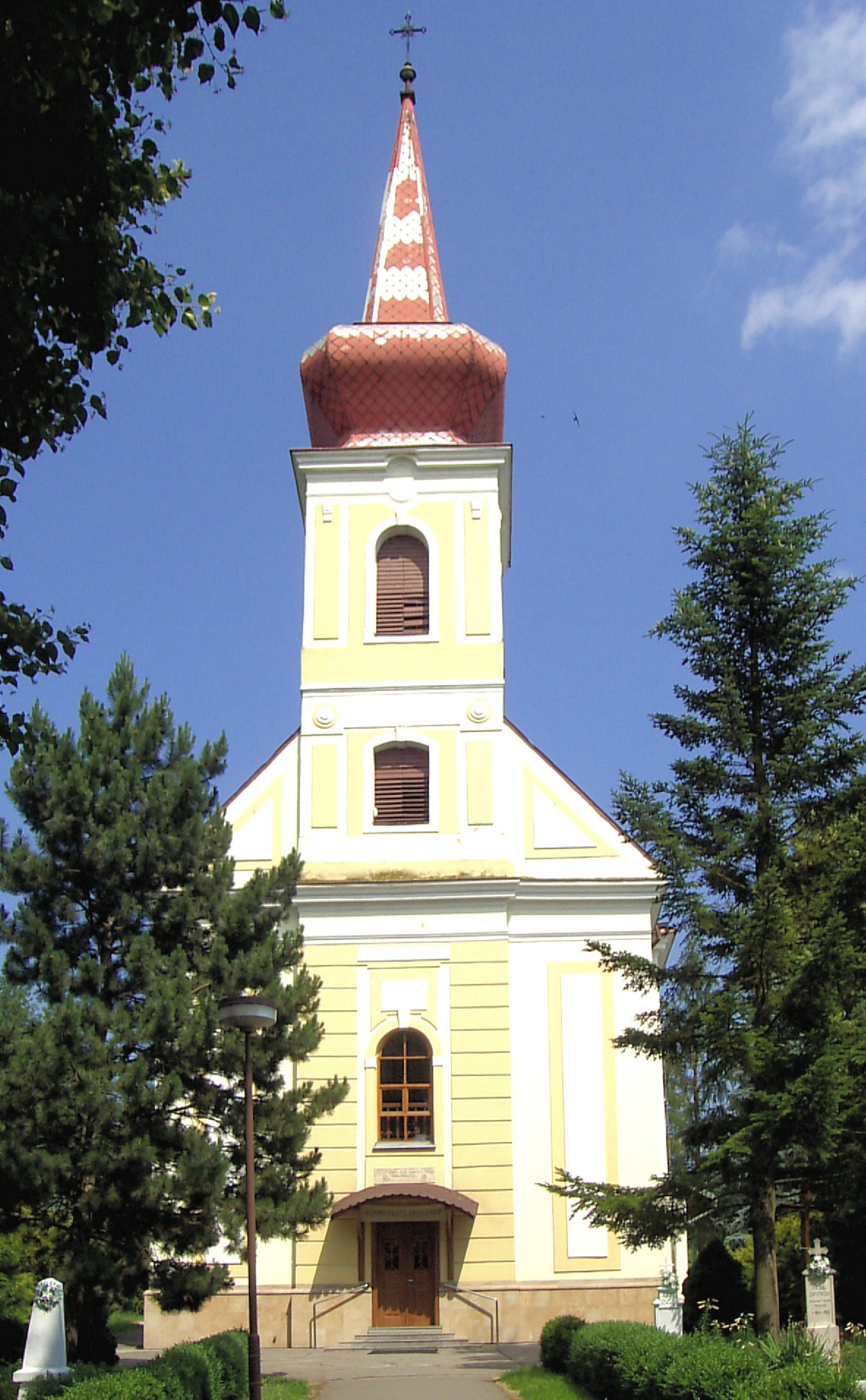

- Flag Coat of arms

- Location of Košické Oľšany in the Košice Region Location of Košické Oľšany in Slovakia
- Coordinates: 48.73°N 21.34°E
- Country: Slovakia
- Region: Košice Region
- District: Košice-okolie District
- First mentioned: 1288

Area
  - Total: 8.66 km^{2} (3.34 sq mi)
- Elevation: 193 m (633 ft)

Population (2025)
  - Total: 1,415
- Time zone: UTC+1 (CET)
  - Summer (DST): UTC+2 (CEST)
- Postal code: 444 2
- Area code: +421 55
- Vehicle registration plate (until 2022): KS
- Website: www.kosickeolsany.sk

Košické Oľšany (Slovak pronunciation: [ˈkɔʂitskeː ˈɔʎʂani]; Hungarian: Kassaolcsvár) is a village and municipality in Košice-okolie District in the Košice Region of eastern Slovakia.

== History ==
In historical records, the village was first mentioned in 1288 when a part of the village belonged to Slanec Lords, and the other part to Krásna nad Hornádom's Benedictine abbey.

== Geography ==
The municipality lies at an altitude of 193 metres (633 ft) and covers an area of 8.66 km^{2} (3.34 sq mi) (2025).

== Population ==
Population statistic (10 years)
Year	1995	2005	2015	2025
Count	838	1164	1279	1415
Difference		+38.90%	+9.87%	+10.63%

Population statistic
Year	2024	2025
Count	1388	1415
Difference		+1.94%

It has a population of 1415 people (31 December 2025).

=== Ethnicity ===
Census 2021 (1+ %)
Ethnicity	Number	Fraction
Slovak	1203	89.24%
Not found out	115	8.53%
Romani	54	4%
Total	1348	

In year 2021 was 1348 people by ethnicity 1203 as Slovak, 115 as Not found out, 54 as Romani, 10 as Hungarian, 7 as Czech, 4 as Ukrainian, 3 as Rusyn, 2 as German, 1 as Polish, 1 as Greek and 1 as Bulgarian.

Note on population: The difference values of population numbers in the table "Population statistic" and in the sections "Ethnicity" & "Religion" is caused by the use of various statistical methods.

=== Religion ===
Census 2021 (1+ %)
Religion	Number	Fraction
Roman Catholic Church	884	65.58%
None	158	11.72%
Not found out	107	7.94%
Calvinist Church	56	4.15%
Greek Catholic Church	52	3.86%
Evangelical Church	43	3.19%
Apostolic Church	22	1.63%
Total	1348	

In year 2021 was 1348 people by religion 884 from Roman Catholic Church, 158 from None, 107 from Not found out, 56 from Calvinist Church, 52 from Greek Catholic Church, 43 from Evangelical Church, 22 from Apostolic Church, 12 from Christian Congregations in Slovakia, 8 from Eastern Orthodox Church, 1 from Old Catholic Church, 1 from New Apostolic Church, 1 from Other, 1 from United Methodist Church, 1 from Seventh-day Adventist Church and 1 from Baptists Church.

== Genealogical resources ==
The records for genealogical research are available at the state archive "Statny Archiv in Kosice, Slovakia"

- Roman Catholic church records (births/marriages/deaths): 1734-1895 (parish A)
- Greek Catholic church records (births/marriages/deaths): 1773-1905 (parish B)
- Lutheran church records (births/marriages/deaths): 1749-1894 (parish B)

== See also ==
- List of municipalities and towns in Slovakia
