= Tornyosnémeti =

Tornyosnémeti Tornyos
- Village
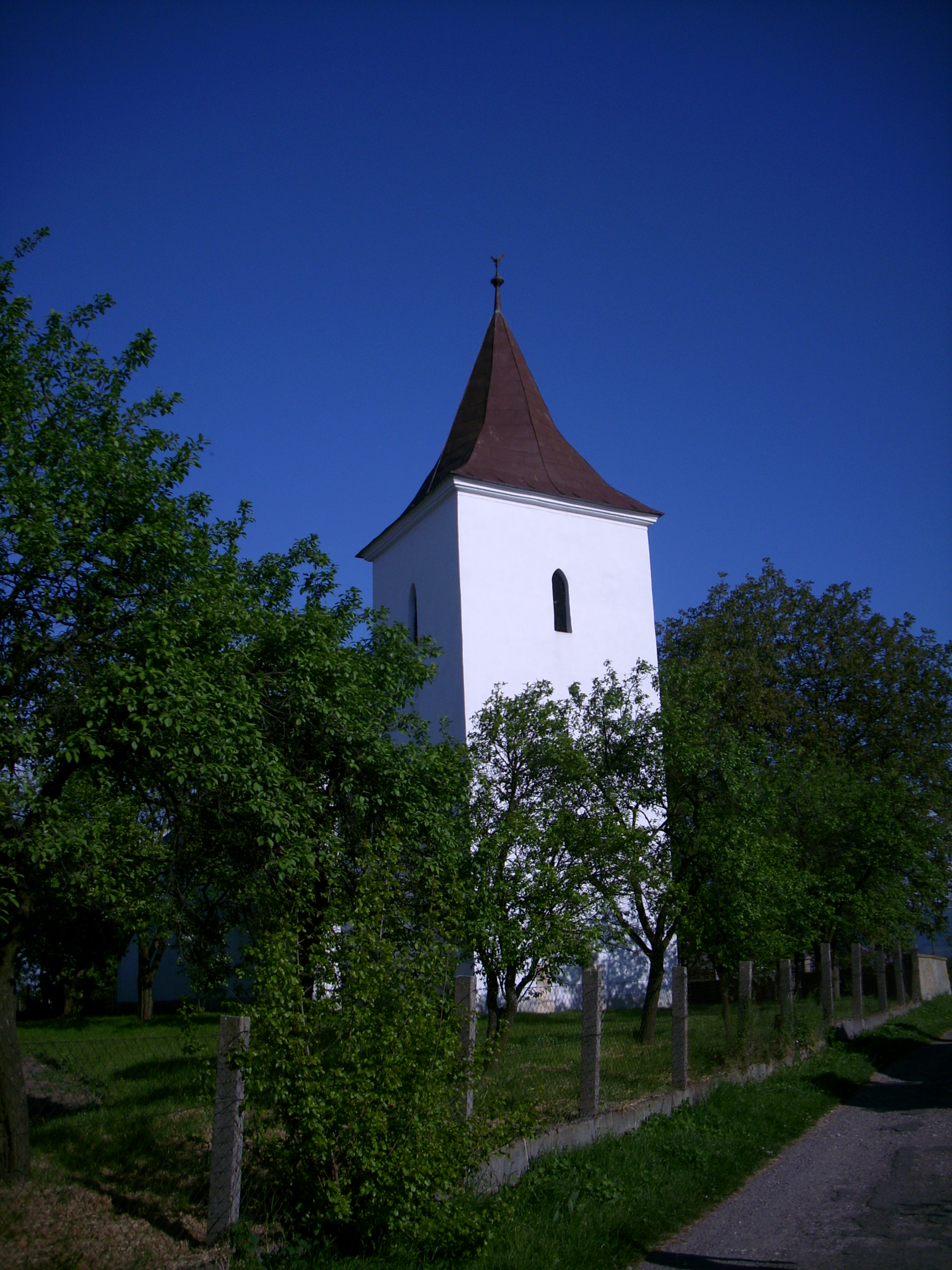
- Protestant church

- Coat of arms

- Location within Hungary
- Coordinates: 48°31′N 21°16′E
- Country: Hungary
- Regions: Northern Hungary
- County: Borsod-Abaúj-Zemplén County

Population (2008)
  - Total: ~500
- Time zone: UTC+1 (CET)
  - Summer (DST): UTC+2 (CEST)

Tornyosnémeti is a village in Borsod-Abaúj-Zemplén County in northeastern Hungary adjacent to the border with Slovakia. Like other small Hungarian villages, it has one small general store and a pub. Tornyosnémeti recently had the M30 motorway completed, allowing faster and easier road connection with Slovakia. Tornyosnémeti is also a rest stop for truck drivers.
