= Nyékládháza =

- Town
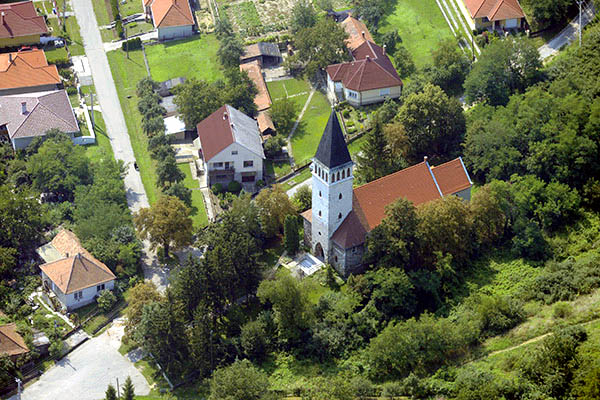
- Roman Catholic church of Nyékládháza built and donated in 1943 by the landowner József Lenz.

- Flag Coat of arms

- Location within Hungary
- Coordinates: 47.99175°N 20.83706°E
- Country: Hungary
- County: Borsod-Abaúj-Zemplén
- District: Miskolc

Area
  - Total: 24.53 km^{2} (9.47 sq mi)

Population (2006)
  - Total: 5,108
  - Density: 202.08/km^{2} (523.4/sq mi)
- Time zone: UTC+1 (CET)
  - Summer (DST): UTC+2 (CEST)
- Postal code: 3433
- Area code: (+36) 46
- Website: www.nyekladhaza.hu

Nyékládháza is a small town in Borsod-Abaúj-Zemplén county, northern Hungary, 20 kilometres (12 miles) from county capital Miskolc.

== History ==
The area has been inhabited since ancient times; archaeological finds include an Avar cemetery. The villages Mezőnyék and Ládháza came into being around the conquest of Hungary; they were mentioned first in 1270 and 1293, respectively, although Mezőnyék had a different name then and had this name only from the 14th century. The name changes indicate that the villages were destroyed several times, but were rebuilt again and again.

The two villages were unified in 1932 under the name Nyékládháza. The village got town status in 2003.

The local Roman Catholic church was built and completely financed in 1943 by the landowner József Lenz (1897–1965), who was also commercial counselor and merchant. József Lenz donated it to the town and to the church, and his son, vitéz József Lenz (1922–1942), who died during the World War II, is buried in the crypt of the temple. His daughter, Klára Lenz (1924–2013) Gobelin tapestry artist, who was the wife of the Hungarian nobleman Endre Farkas de Boldogfa (1908–1994), Major of the General Staff of the Hungarian Armies during World War II, donated part of her tapestry collection to the town.

== Tourist sights, programs ==
- Szepessy-Egry manor
- Baroque Protestant church
- Lake Nyéki
- Saint's Day Fair in August
- Roman Catholic church built in 1943
- The Gobelin tapestry collection of Klára Lenz

== Twin towns – sister cities ==
Nyékládháza is twinned with:

- Chrzanów, Poland
