= Milhosť =

Village in the Košice Region of Slovakia

Milhosť Migléc
- Municipality
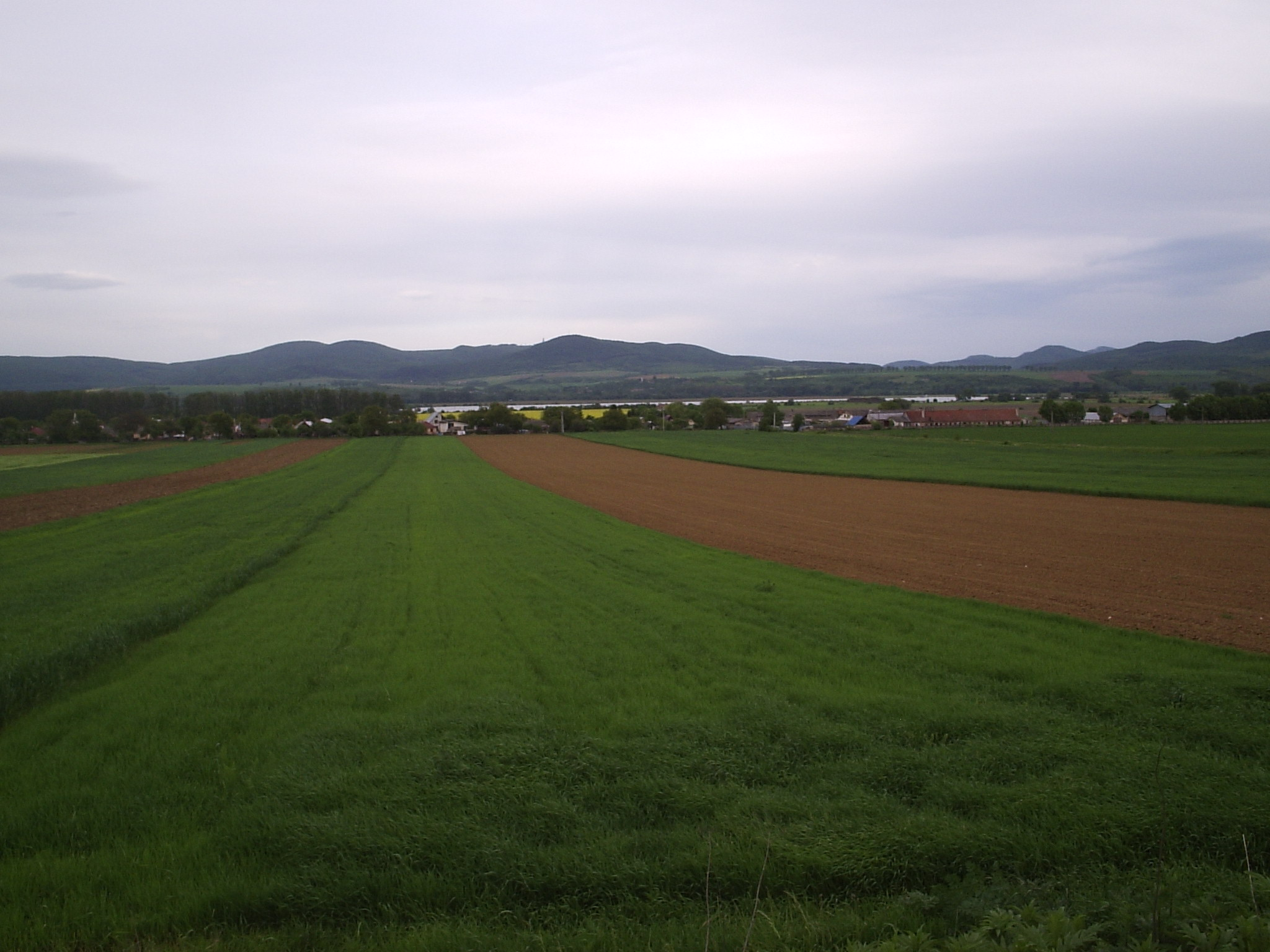

- Flag

- Location of Milhosť in the Košice Region Location of Milhosť in Slovakia
- Coordinates: 48.53°N 21.27°E
- Country: Slovakia
- Region: Košice Region
- District: Košice-okolie District
- First mentioned: 1318

Area
  - Total: 7.78 km^{2} (3.00 sq mi)
- Elevation: 166 m (545 ft)

Population (2025)
  - Total: 405
- Time zone: UTC+1 (CET)
  - Summer (DST): UTC+2 (CEST)
- Postal code: 445 8
- Area code: +421 55
- Vehicle registration plate (until 2022): KS
- Website: www.milhost.sk

Milhosť (German: Mitterdeutschdorf or Mühlgast; Hungarian: Migléc) is a village and municipality in Košice-okolie District in the Košice Region of eastern Slovakia. It is situated 21 km from Slovakia's second biggest city, Košice. Milhosť is surrounded by two neighbouring villages Kechnec and Seňa. Moreover, it is a border crossing village between Hungary (Tornyosnémeti) and Slovakia (Milhosť).

== Etymology ==
The name comes from a Slavic personal name Milgost (see also e.g. Gemerský Milhosť, Milhosťov, Milhostice, Milhošť). It got its second name Németi (in Hungarian "German") after the arrival German colonists.

Village names:.

- 1403- Felsekysnemethy, Myglez
- 1405- Kysnemety, Mikliz
- 1415- Kis Németi, Miglész
- 1427- Migles
- 1512- Kis Nemethi
- 1523- Migleznemethy
- 1746- Miglécz
- 1773- 1786, 1790, 1808- Miglécz
- 1863- 1902, 1920- 1938- Migléc
- 1907-1913, 1938- 1945- Miglécnémeti
- 1945- 1947 Migléc
- 1948- 1964 Milhosť
- 1964- 1985 Hraničná pri Hornáde/border crossing village next to Hornád/ (Milhosť + Kechnec)
- 1993 Milhosť (gained its independence), Migléc

== History ==
The first historical records of Milhosť are from [1220]. At this time German colonists, who came during the years 1205-1209 A.D., were living in this area. The village had not been an independent ham in the 13th century. It was just a settlement which belonged to a village called Középnémeti. The first written record of Milhosť appears in the 14th century, which mentioned a St. Michael´s chapel from 1322, however the chapels' location is not known today. The name of the village changed over the years. It varied from Felsekysnemethy to its present form Milhosť.

Only Germans were living in this area till 1500 AD. At the beginning of the 16th century Hungarian families arrived and as a result the number of the German population decreased. There are no records of German families after 1600 AD but there was an increase in Slovak settlers. In 1720 AD the number of Hungarian and Slovak inhabitants was equal. The arrival of the first Jews began in 1787 and Romani people in the year 1850.

== Geography ==
The municipality lies at an altitude of 166 metres (545 ft) and covers an area of 7.78 km^{2} (3.00 sq mi) (2025).

== Population ==
Population statistic (10 years)
Year	1995	2005	2015	2025
Count	358	371	387	405
Difference		+3.63%	+4.31%	+4.65%

Population statistic
Year	2024	2025
Count	402	405
Difference		+0.74%

It has a population of 405 people (31 December 2025).

=== Ethnicity ===
Census 2021 (1+ %)
Ethnicity	Number	Fraction
Slovak	305	77.8%
Hungarian	101	25.76%
Romani	15	3.82%
Not found out	11	2.8%
Total	392	

In year 2021 was 392 people by ethnicity 305 as Slovak, 101 as Hungarian, 15 as Romani, 11 as Not found out and 1 as Czech.

Note on population: The difference values of population numbers in the table "Population statistic" and in the sections "Ethnicity" & "Religion" is caused by the use of various statistical methods.

=== Religion ===
Census 2021 (1+ %)
Religion	Number	Fraction
Roman Catholic Church	173	44.13%
Calvinist Church	106	27.04%
None	69	17.6%
Not found out	15	3.83%
Greek Catholic Church	14	3.57%
Jehovah's Witnesses	6	1.53%
Evangelical Church	4	1.02%
Total	392	

In year 2021 was 392 people by religion 173 from Roman Catholic Church, 106 from Calvinist Church, 69 from None, 15 from Not found out, 14 from Greek Catholic Church, 6 from Jehovah's Witnesses, 4 from Evangelical Church, 2 from Christian Congregations in Slovakia, 2 from Apostolic Church and 1 from Buddhism.

== Culture ==
The village has a public library and a petrol station.

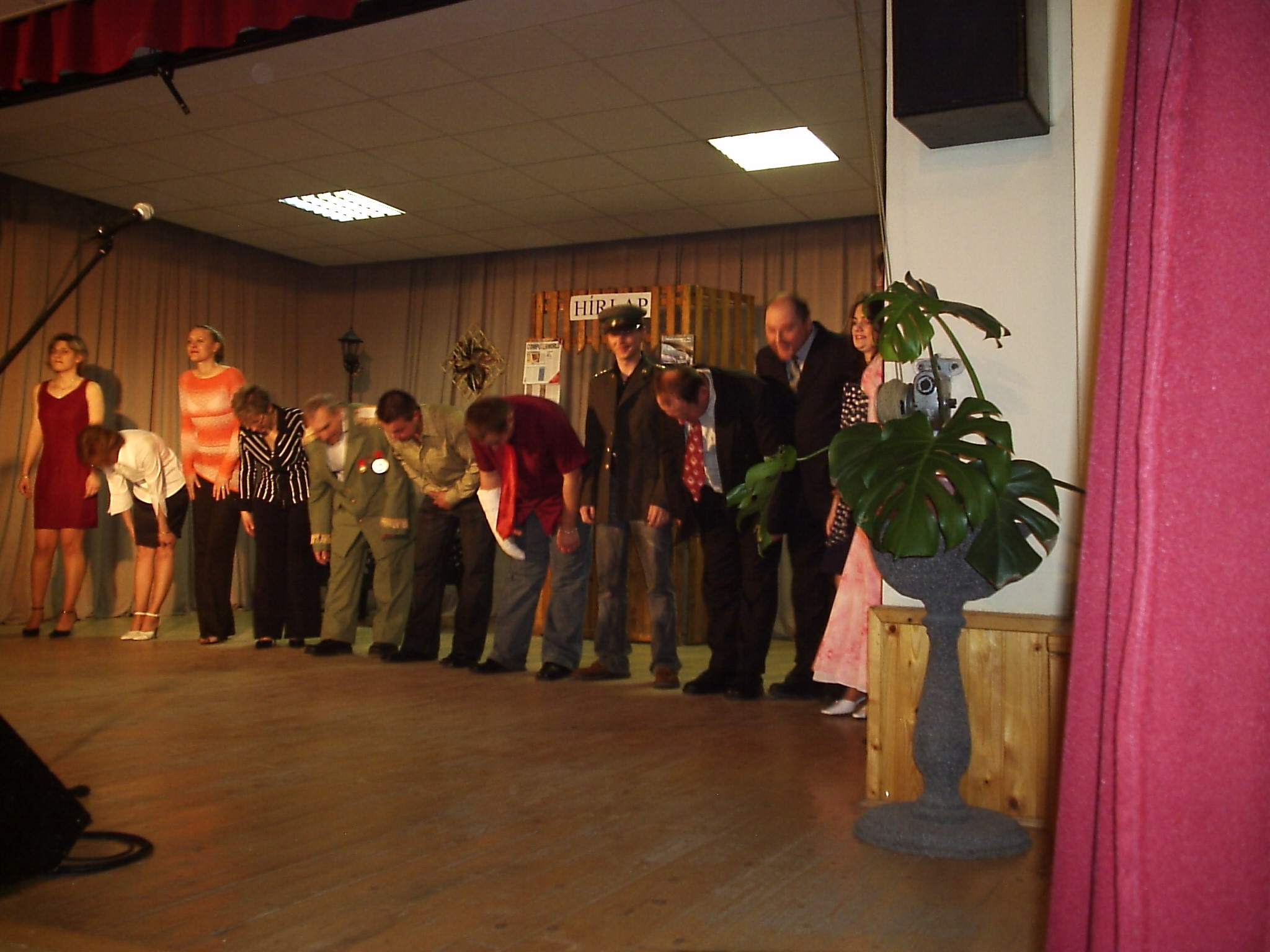
The drama club at the end of their variety

A non-professional drama club functions in the village, associated with the CSEMADOK (Csehszlovákiai Magyar Dolgozók Kulturális Szövetsége / Czechoslovak Hungarian Workers´ Cultural Association), with around 10-15 Hungarian speaking members. A variety is performed by them each winter to entertain the villagers. A couple of the members are invited to various occasion to the neighbouring villages, to Hungarian villages as well, to perform small plays or sing.
