= European route E79 =

Road in trans-European E-road network

E79

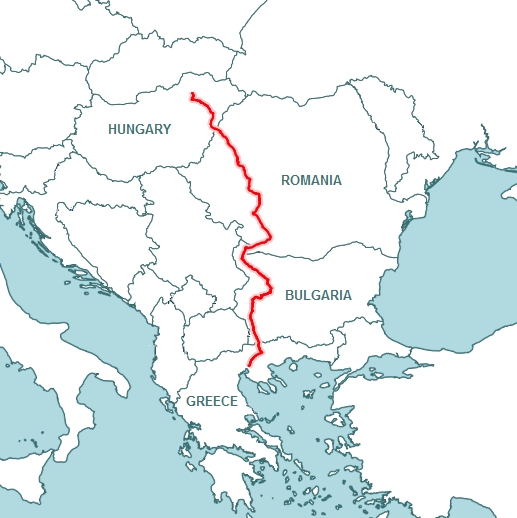

Route information
- Length: 1,300 km (810 mi)

Major junctions
- North end: Miskolc, Hungary
- South end: Thessaloniki, Greece

Location
- Countries: Hungary; Romania; Bulgaria; Greece

Highway system
- International E-road network; A Class; B Class

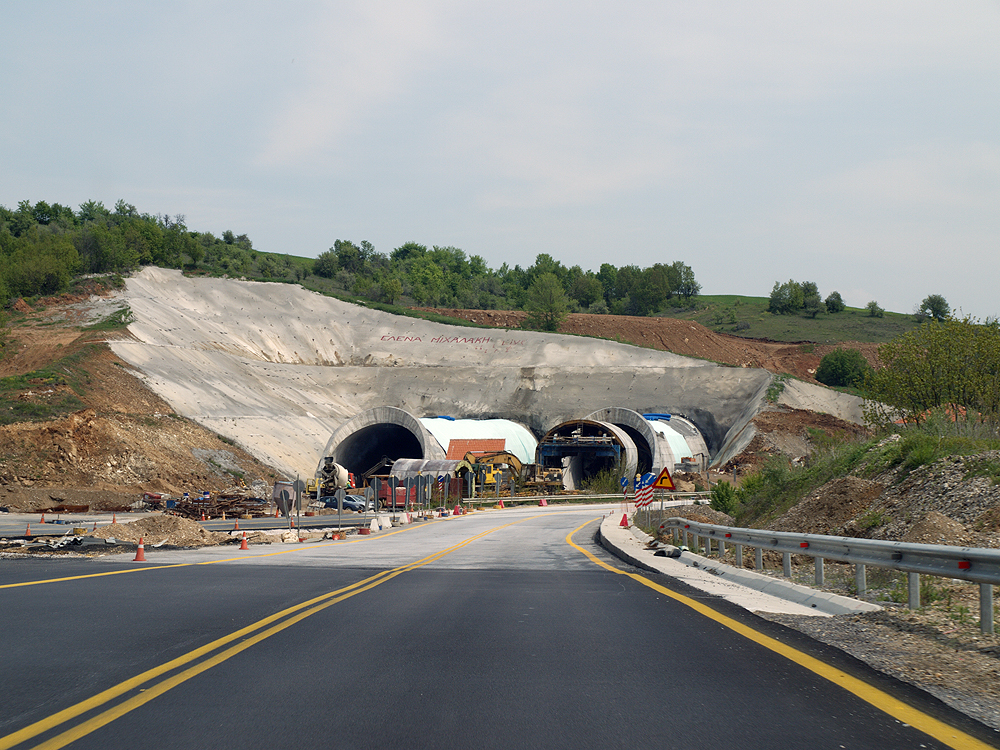
Construction of two-way tunnel on Route E79 in Greece (Completed)

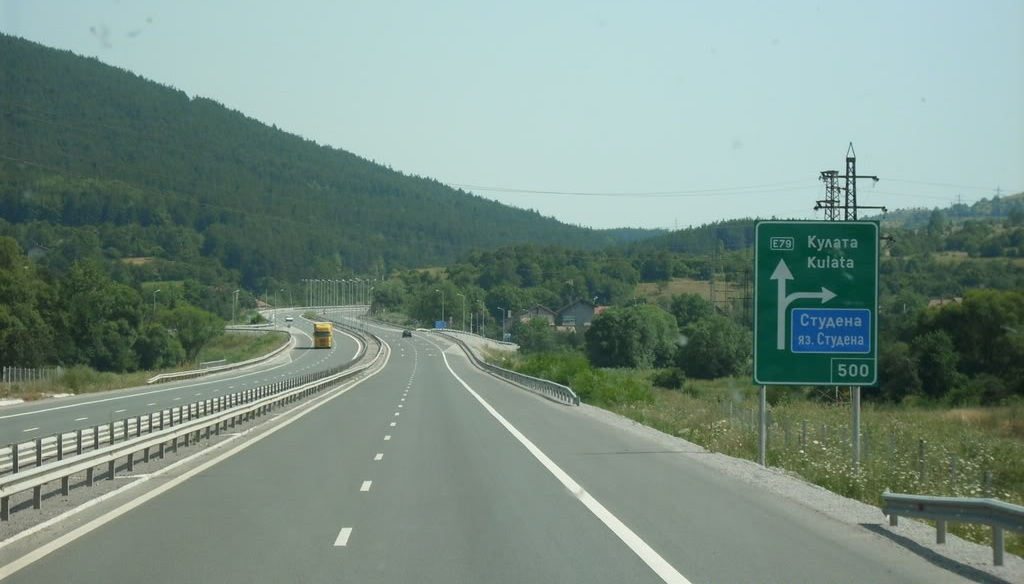
E79 in Bulgaria (motorway stretch)

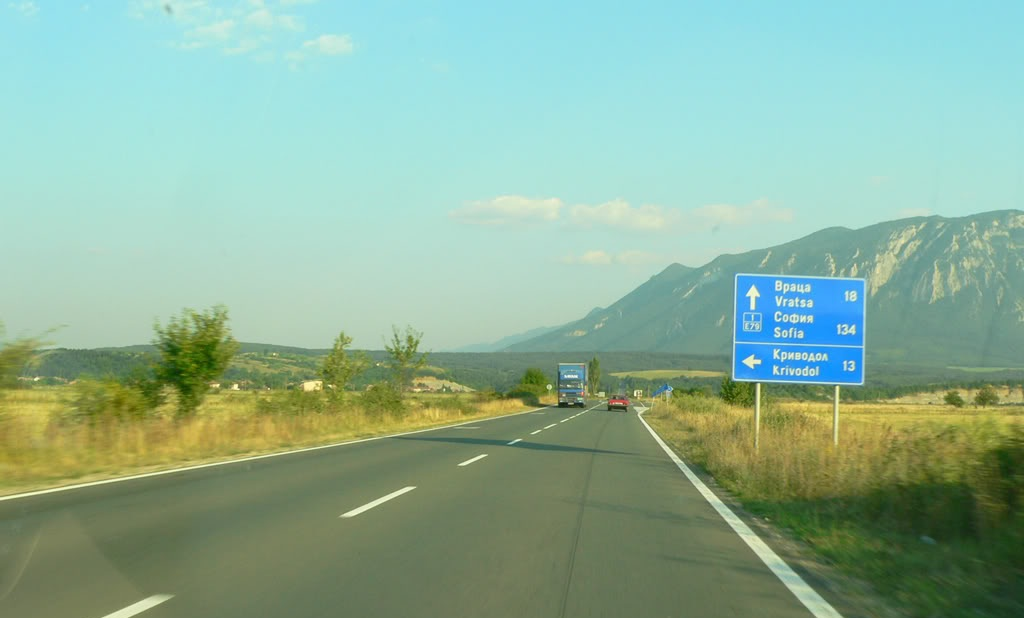
E79 in Bulgaria (non-motorway stretch)

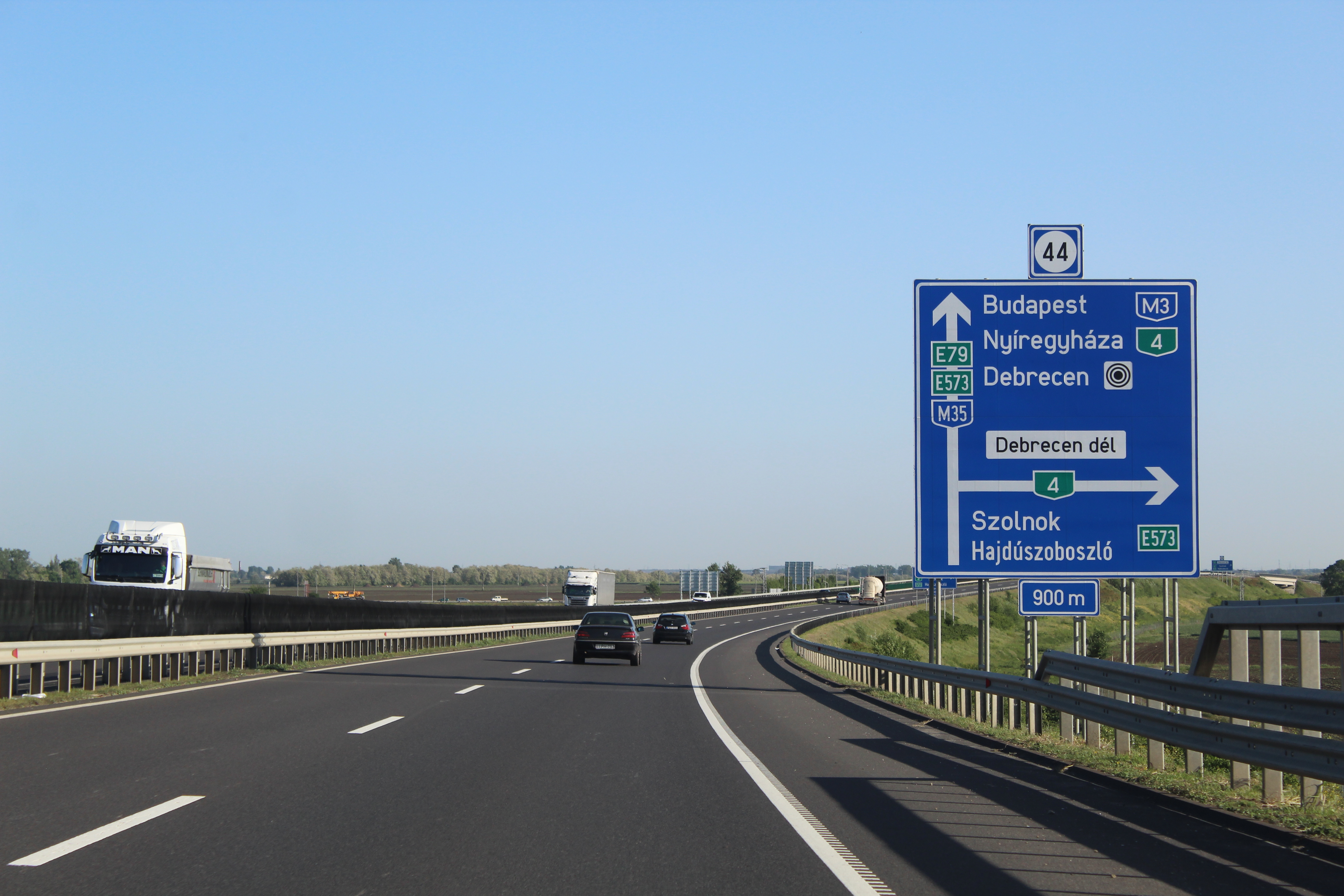
E79 in Hungary near Debrecen (M35 motorway)

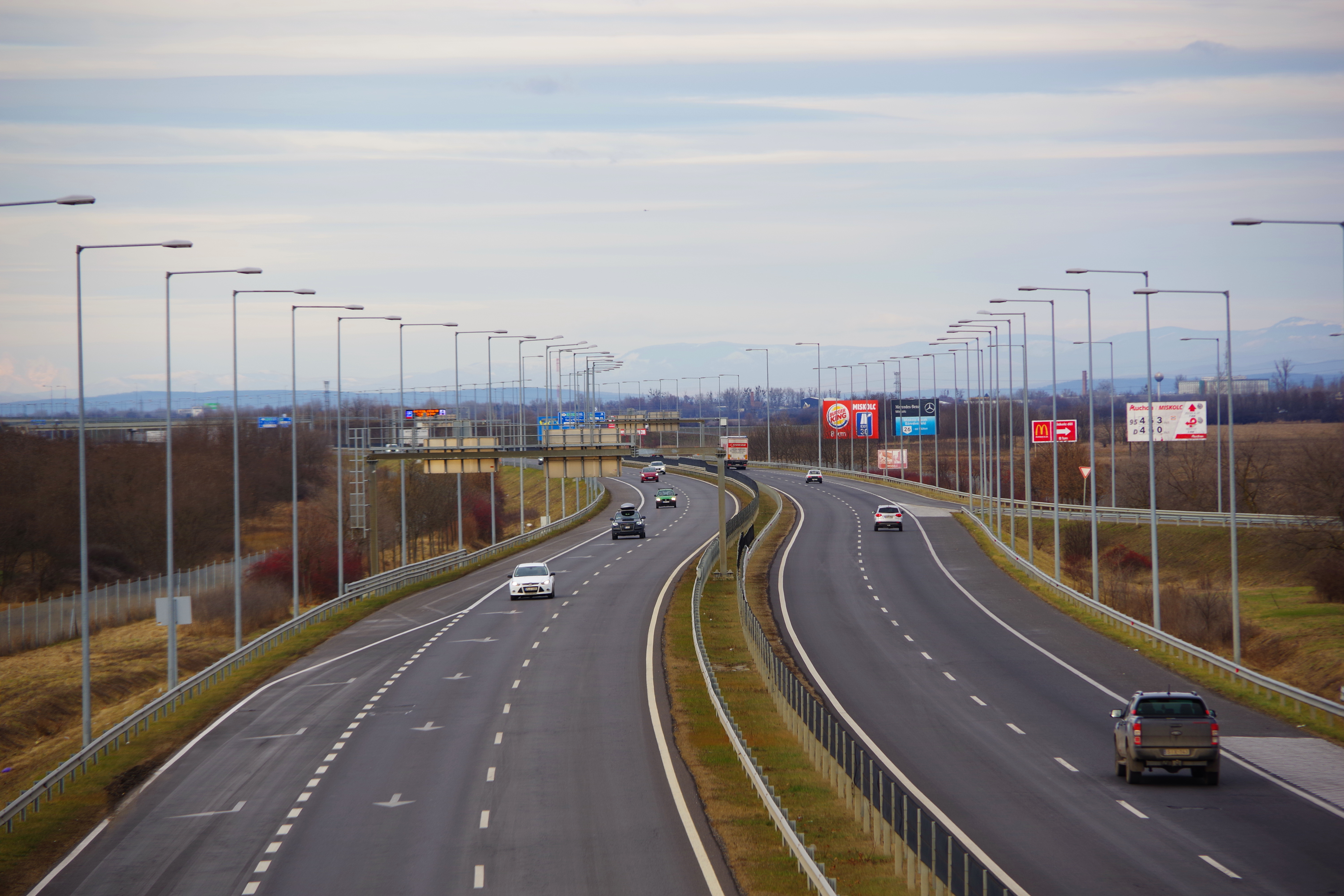
E79 in Hungary near Miskolc (M30 motorway)

European route E 79 is a road part of the International E-road network. It begins in Miskolc, Hungary and ends in Thessaloniki, Greece, also running through Romania and Bulgaria. The road is 1,300 km (810 mi) long.

== Itinerary ==
The E 79 routes through four European countries:

Hungary

- M30: Miskolc (Start of Concurrency of E71) - Igrici
- M3: Igrici (End of Concurrency of E71) - Görbeháza
- M35: Görbeháza - Debrecen ( E573) - Berettyóújfalu
- M4: Berettyóújfalu (Start of Concurrency of E60) - Nagykereki

Romania

- DN1: Borș - Oradea (End of Concurrency of E60)
- DN76: Oradea - Beiuș - Deva
- A 1: Deva bypass ( E68)
- DN66: Deva - Petroșani - Târgu Jiu - Filiași
- DN6: Filiași (Start of Concurrency of E70) - Craiova (End of Concurrency of E70)
- DN56: Craiova - Calafat

Bulgaria

- I-1: Vidin - Montana - Vratsa - Botevgrad
- A 2 (Hemus motorway): Botevgrad - Sofia
- A 6 (Europe motorway): E80 E871
- I-18 (Sofia Ring Road): West (Western arc)
- A 3: Sofia - Pernik – Blagoevgrad
- I-1: Blagoevgrad - Kulata

Greece

- A25: Promachonas - Serres - Thessaloniki ( E90)

== Route description ==
=== Hungary ===
The Hungarian section of E79 shares parts of its path with other E-roads, such as E60, E573 and E71.

=== Romania ===
The Romanian section of the road is mostly new asphalt, as can be seen on the map with Romanian road quality. Although only in the region of 500 km (310 mi) the road itself has many curves as it goes directly through 2 major mountain groups of the Carpathian range: the Apuseni Mountains and the Meridionali Mountains. With a 50 km/h (31 mph) restriction when passing through the many minor villages, and a large part of its length in the Carpathian mountains (about 40-50% of its length in Romania), the average speed is generally in the 50–60 km/h range. Especially in the mountainous parts, the road can be considered as more suitable for tourism than for high speed traveling, but as it has been in a very poor state up until a couple of years ago, touristic infrastructure is still poorly developed (road side hotels, restaurants). Plan ahead if you consider staying overnight in hotels on this route (best options are outside of the cities, with few exceptions - Oradea, Deva - but there are not so many decent locations for accommodation).

Since 2012, work has begun to improve the quality of this road:

- A. Oradea – Deva (Șoimuș) [under construction on approx. 2-3 % of its length]: Most of the road in this section has been modernized (as of August 2021, about 95% is in good condition). Drive carefully, especially during the night or in bad weather conditions, as many safety elements may be missing (there are many parts with good asphalt, but no traffic signs and road marks). Parts of the road are still under construction, while other parts have been finished and are good (some excellent). In August 2021, 3 traffic lights were still in place on this section.

Contracts were signed in late 2012 to improve this section. Status of work progress is December 2017, by section, North to South:

- Oradea-Beiuș (cca. 60 km): This section has been recently re-done completely. There may still be areas with poor or no road markings, so travel carefully especially during the night.

- Beiuș-Ștei (cca. 28 km): This section has been recently re-done completely. There may still be areas with poor or no road markings, so travel carefully especially during the night. Constructor: AZVI/AZCALE (cca. 100 mil. RON without VAT, contract 5R13, progress in December 2016: >90%).

- Ștei-Vârfurile (cca. 33 km): Currently under construction on about 20-30% of its length. There still are 3 traffic lights in this sector. Work is progressing normally and the sector should be finished by the end of 2021. First contractor: SC Antreprenor Construct Mod SRL (progress status: 70% in December 2016). Contract was terminated and rest of the work was re-auctioned. Second constructor: Asocierea DRUM ASFALT S.R.L. & VAHOSTAV - SK a.s. & TRAMECO S.A. & ILE VIOREL CONSTRUCT S.R.L. (contract signed in May 2020).

- Vârfurile-Ionești (cca. 14 km): This mountainous section is still under construction (2–3 km still in heavy construction), with some parts in good condition (asphalt), but with no road markings, so travel carefully during the night. On many climbs, now there are 2 lines going up hill and one line down, so passing heavy traffic is possible. Original contractor was VIALES Y OBRAS PUBLICAS (cca. 43 mil RON without VAT, contract 5R11, progress in 2015: 29.76%). Contract cancelled in September 2015. Re-auctioned recently. Auction won by SC SYLC CON TRANS SRL / HIDROSTROY AD --- 55.945.649,16 RON without VAT. source

Starting with Ionești, the road is good until as far south as Calafat (400 km), with only very small portions still under construction.

- Ionești-Brad (cca. 20 km): PORR (cca. 65 mil. RON without VAT, contract 5R10b, 100% finished in December 2017).

- Șoimuș-Brad (cca. 30 km): SELINA (105 mil. RON without VAT, contract 5R10a, progress status in December 2017 - 100% - section accepted as completed by the national road company).

Initial financing sources for all contracts was: 50% from the state budget, 50% loaned from the European Investment Bank. On 4 December 2013, the Romanian Ministry for European Funds included this project on the list of infrastructure projects financed by the EU. The Ministry sent to the European Commission a request to evaluate the financing of this sector, for a total of 210 million Euro (of which 142 million Euro from the EU through the ERDF mechanism).

- B. Deva – Petroșani [good, done]: The road has been significantly improved in the last years, being widened and having excellent asphalt quality on the entire section of the road (construction finished in 2012). It has recently been repaired (top layer of asphalt replaced). Small portions may still be under repair near Simeria (as of August 2021), but all work should finish in autumn/winter 2021. The portion Simeria-Hateg has no road markings (August 2021), but this too should be fixed by the end of the year.
- C. Petroșani – Bumbești Jiu [good, small part still under construction - less than 1 km]: This section should be considered as good. Conditions have improved in late 2017 (due to rehabilitation work done by Copisa Constructora Pirenaica–Chirulli Andrea Impresa Individual–Coremi Inter joint venture - 34 mil. euro contract, signed on 29 June 2012). On 29 November 2013, the Romanian Ministry for European Funds sent to the European Commission a request to evaluate the financing of this sector, for a total of 396 million Euro (of which 288 eligible for EU funds, of which 244 million Euro from the EU through the ERDF mechanism). Works on this section were expected to take around two years, and were expected to be finished by the end of 2014. In December 2016, the section was still under construction on about 40% of its length. It is currently almost completely rehabilitated, with very good asphalt and jersey blocks to prevent fall into the valley. A small part of the road (less than 1 km), near an old monastery (Lainici), is still under construction in 2021 (as several variants were considered to move traffic away from the building). 2 bridges over the river Jiu are still under construction (Lainici and Bumbești), but will most likely be finished during 2018.
- D. Bumbești Jiu – Craiova [good, minor construction work]: The section Bumbești Jiu – Rovinari is in good condition, almost completely rehabilitated (rehabilitation work by Asocierea Comsa S.A.U. - Corporate Management Solution SRL, 117 mil. RON, 85% FEDR + 15% National funds, 90% done in January 2016 according to the national roads company). The section Rovinari - Filiasi has been repaired in 2010, by FCC Construccion, and is currently in good condition. The section Filiași – Craiova is part of the DN6 road and is in good condition, also being repaired in 2010.
- E. Craiova – Calafat [good, almost done, cca. 95%]: In December 2017, the 2 sub-sections (Craiova-Galicea Mare, Galicea Mare-Calafat) are 92%, and 98% done. On 6 December 2013, the Romanian Ministry for European Funds sent to the European Commission a request to evaluate the financing of this sector, for a total of 73 million Euro (of which 47 million Euro from the EU through the ERDF mechanism).

=== Bulgaria ===
The Bulgarian section of E79 spans nearly 400 km (250 mi) from the North Bulgarian city of Vidin, connecting the Calafat–Vidin Bridge across the Danube River and straight southwards towards Bulgaria's capital Sofia. The road has a moderately good surface, it is constantly maintained and repaired and well signed with directing signs in Bulgarian and in English. Most of the way from Vidin to Botevgrad, the road is two-lane tarmac road following the natural relief of the landscape. There are sections where 3 lanes for overtaking slow-moving traffic are available. Rest stops and parking spots near the road are also available. The Bulgarian Traffic law prescribes a 50 km/h (31 mph) in most residential areas coinciding with the route of the road and not more than 90 km/h (56 mph) on the section of the road outside living areas. Currently the Vidin-Montana motorway and Montana-Botevgrad expressway are under construction with planned speed up to 120 km/h (75 mph).

From Botevgrad to Sofia, E79 joins Hemus motorway (A2). At the Bulgarian capital Sofia it follows Sofia Northern Bypass motorway and then Sofia Ring Road. From Sofia all the way to the border with Greece, E79 joins Struma motorway (A3) with the exception of the Kresna Gorge pass, which still use the old 2-lane standard road. The Bulgarian Traffic law allows speeds up to 140 km/h (87 mph) on motorways unless otherwise stated.

There are no restrictions to trucks driving in the weekends (except when temps rise above 38 °C (100 °F)) so they pose additional road hazard particularly high when driving at night. Traffic is usually heavy on weekends and overtaking has to be done swiftly and without risk, minding the other participants in the traffic.

At night, motorcyclists are required (and that is strongly advisable for their own safety) to use high-visibility vests.

=== Greece ===
The E79 in Greece is about 110 km (68 mi) long, and currently runs from Promachonas in the north to Thessaloniki in the south, via Serres. In relation to the national road network, the E79 currently follows (in order, from north to south):

- The A25 motorway, from Promachonas to Lagkadas
- The A2 motorway, from Lagkadas to Efkarpia
- The EO2 road, from Efkarpia to Thessaloniki

The E79 runs concurrently with the E90 on the A2 segment: the E79 also connects with the Thessaloniki branch of the E75, at Plateia Dimokratias.
