= Emőd =

- Town
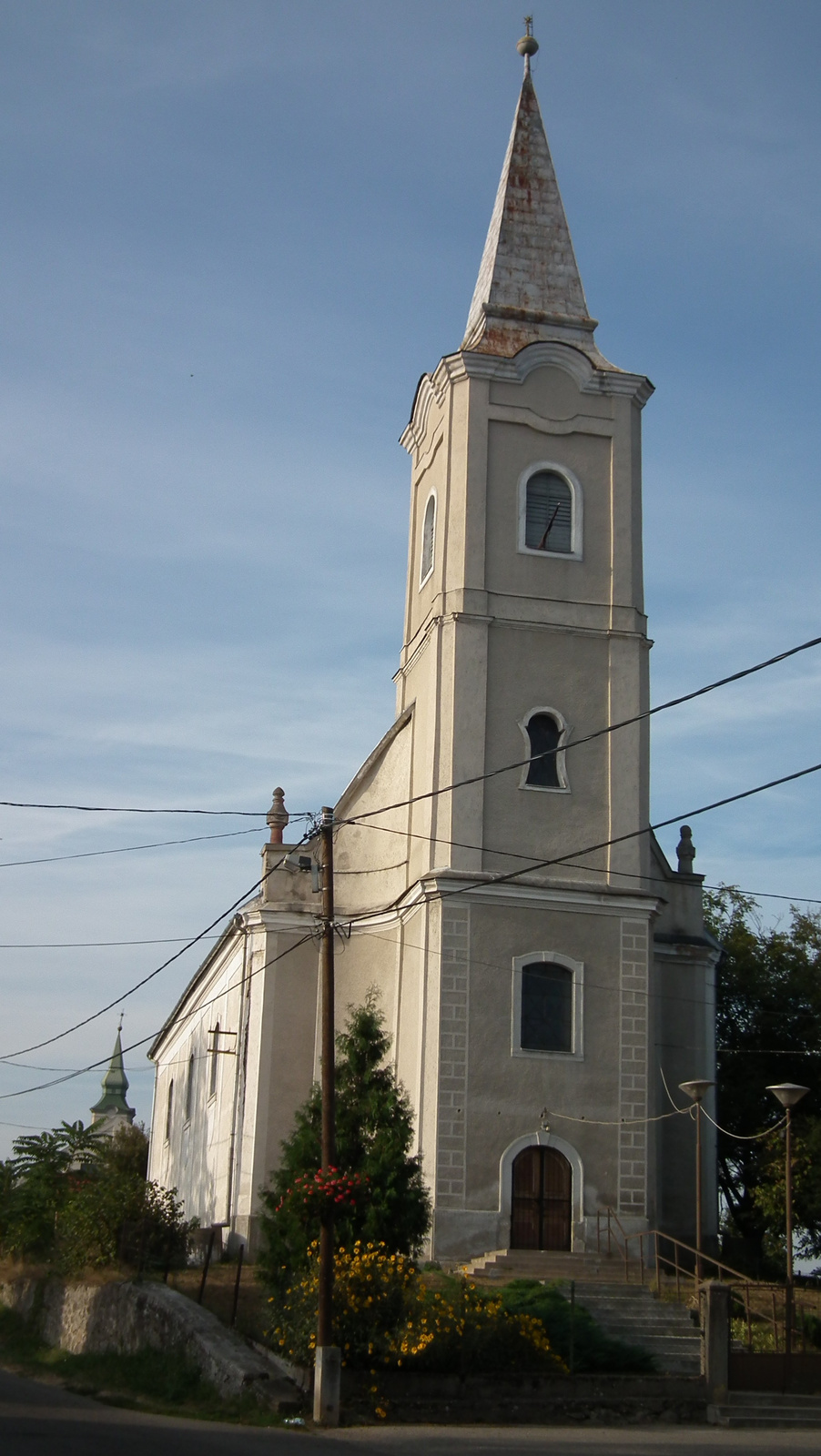
- Reformed church

- Flag Coat of arms

- Location of Emőd
- Coordinates: 47.93333°N 20.81690°E
- Country: Hungary
- County: Borsod-Abaúj-Zemplén
- District: Miskolc

Area
  - Total: 49.42 km^{2} (19.08 sq mi)

Population (2015)
  - Total: 4,785
  - Density: 96.82/km^{2} (250.8/sq mi)
- Time zone: UTC+1 (CET)
  - Summer (DST): UTC+2 (CEST)
- Postal code: 3432
- Area code: (+36) 46
- Website: www.emod.hu

Emőd is a very small town in Borsod-Abaúj-Zemplén county, Northern Hungary, 25 kilometers from county capital Miskolc.

== History ==
The area has been inhabited since the Conquest of Hungary. Its name comes from an old Hungarian personal name. The town was first mentioned by an anonymous notary of Béla III. Emőd has been a wine-growing area since the 14th century. In 1882 it was burnt down, but was rebuilt later. In 1872 it was downgraded to a village, its town status being restored on 19 August 2001.

Before World War II, there was a Jewish community in Emőd. At its height, there were 123 Jews in the community most of them were murdered by the Nazis in the Holocaust.
