= List of crossings of the Danube =

This is a list of crossings of the Danube river, from its mouth in the Black Sea to its source in Germany. Next to each bridge listed is information regarding the year in which it was constructed and for what use it was constructed (foot bridge, bicycle bridge, road bridge or railway bridge), and the distance from the mouth of the river in kilometres where available.

== Romania ==
Crossing	Distance from mouth (in km)	Carries	Location	Built	Coordinates	Photograph
Galați Tunnel		DN22E	Galați, I.C. Brătianu	(Proposed)		
Brăila Bridge	165.8	European route E87	Brăila, Smârdan	2018 (Note: The largest bridge over the Danube)		
Giurgeni – Vadu Oii Bridge	238	DN2A road	Giurgeni, Hârșova	22 Dec 1970		
Anghel Saligny Bridge	300	Căile Ferate Române Line 800	Cernavodă, Fetești	1895		
Cernavodă Bridge	300.07	A2 motorway, Căile Ferate Române Line 800	Cernavodă	1987		

=== Romania-Bulgaria border ===
Crossing	Distance from mouth (in km)	Carries	Location	Built	Coordinates	Photograph
Silistra-Călărași Hydrotechnical Complex	380		Silistra, Călărași	(Planned)		
Danube Bridge	488.7	European route E85, railway line	Ruse, Giurgiu	20 Jun 1954		
Nikopol-Turnu Magurele Hydrotechnical Complex	578		Nikopol, Turnu Măgurele	(Proposed)		
Constantine's Bridge		Roman road	Sucidava	328 (Note: Destroyed mid-4th century)		
Oryahovo–Bechet Bridge			Oryahovo, Bechet	(Planned)		
New Europe Bridge	796	European route E79, railway line (Note: between CFR Line 912 and BDZ Line 7)	Calafat, Vidin	14 Jun 2013		

=== Romania–Serbia border ===
Crossing	Distance from mouth (in kilometres)	Carries	Location	Built	Coordinates	Photograph
Ostrovul Mare Bridge	863	Road	Mehedinți County	1998		
Iron Gate II Hydroelectric Power Station	864	DN56A	Gogoșu, Negotin Municipality	1985		
Trajan's Bridge		Road	Drobeta-Turnu Severin	Built in 105 AD; destroyed.		
Iron Gate I Hydroelectric Power Station	942	State road 35, European route E771, DN6A	Iron Gate	7 Sep 1964		

== Serbia ==
Crossing	Distance from mouth (in kilometres)	Carries	Location	Built	Coordinates	Photograph
Kovin Bridge	1112.1	Expressway 14	Kovin Municipality, Smederevo City	26 Nov 1976		
Pančevo Bridge		European route E70	Belgrade	7 Nov 1946		
Pupin Bridge			Belgrade	2014		
Beška Bridge (northbound)	1232	A1 motorway, European route E75	Inđija Municipality	2011		
Beška Bridge (southbound)	1232	A1 motorway, European route E75	Inđija Municipality	1975		
Žeželj Bridge	1254.1	road, Railway	Novi Sad	2018		
Boško Perošević Bridge	1254.2		Novi Sad	2000		
Varadin Bridge	1255	IIA-100 highway	Novi Sad	2000		
Liberty Bridge	1257.6	Liberation Boulevard	Novi Sad	1981		

=== Croatian–Serbian border ===
Crossing	Distance from mouth (in kilometres)	Carries	Location	Built	Coordinates	Photograph
Ilok–Bačka Palanka Bridge	1297	D2 road, IIA-108 highway	Ilok, Bačka Palanka	1974		
Erdut–Bogojevo Railway Bridge		Railway bridge	Erdut, Bogojevo	1911		
Erdut–Bogojevo Road Bridge		D213 road, Expressway 17	Erdut, Bogojevo	1980		
Batina Bridge	1424.8	D212 road, State Road 16	Batina, Bezdan	1974		

== Hungary ==
Crossing	Distance from mouth (in kilometres)	Carries	Location	Opened	Coordinates	Photo
István Türr Bridge	1480.22	Hungarian road 55, Bátaszék–Baja–Kiskunhalas railway line	Baja, Pörböly	1999		
Szent László bridge	1498.8	M9 motorway	Szekszárd, Dusnok	2003		
Pál Tomori Bridge		Road 512, Hungary	Paks, Foktő	2024		
József Beszédes Bridge	1560.55	Hungarian road 54	Solt, Dunaföldvár	2001		
Pentele Bridge	1571.7	M8 motorway	Dunaújváros, Dunavecse	2007		
Deák Ferenc Bridge	1632.8	M0 motorway	Szigetszentmiklós, Budapest	2012		
Connective Railway Bridge	1643	Budapest–Hegyeshalom railway line	Budapest	1953		
Rákóczi Bridge	1643	Hungary boulevard	Budapest	1995		
Petőfi Bridge	1644.3	Grand Boulevard	Budapest	1952		
Liberty Bridge	1645.3	Small Boulevard, Béla Bartók Avenue	Budapest	2009		
Elisabeth Bridge	1646	Rákóczi Avenue, Hegyalja Avenue	Budapest	1964		
Széchenyi Chain Bridge	1647	Adam Clark Square, Széchenyi István Square	Budapest	1840		
Kossuth Bridge		Batthyány Square, Kossuth Square	Budapest	18 Jan 1946		
Margaret Bridge	1648.75	Grand Boulevard	Budapest	2011		
Árpád Bridge	1651.3	Hungary boulevard, Vörösvári út, Szentendrei út	Budapest, Óbuda, Budapest District XIII	7 Nov 1950		
Újpest railway bridge	1654.5	Budapest–Esztergom railway	Budapest	1896		
Megyeri Bridge	1660	M0 motorway	Budapest, Dunakeszi	30 Sep 2008		

=== Hungary-Slovakia border ===
Crossing	Distance from mouth (in kilometres)	Carries	Location	Built	Coordinates	Photo
Mária Valéria Bridge	1718.5	Route I/63, Route 11326	Esztergom, Štúrovo	2001		
Elisabeth Bridge	1767.8	Hungarian road 13, route I/64	Komárno, Komárom	1946		
Komárom rail bridge	1770.4	Komárom–Nové Zámky railway line	Komárom, Komárno	1955		
Monostor Bridge	1770.57	Hungarian road 13, route I/64	Komárom, Komárno	2020		
Vámosszabadi bridge	1806	Hungarian road 14, route I/13	Medveďov, Vámosszabadi	1973		

== Slovakia ==
Crossing	Distance from mouth (in km)	Carries	Location	Built	Coordinates	Photo
Čunovo Dam			Čunovo			
Lužný most		D4 motorway	Bratislava	2021		
Prístavný most	1866.4	Bratislava–Hegyeshalom railway line, D1 motorway	Bratislava	1985		
Apollo Bridge			Bratislava	4 Sep 2005		
Starý most	1868.14	tram tracks, with pedestrian and bicycle sidewalks	Old Town of Bratislava	2016 (Note: Originally built in 1891 as Franz Joseph Bridge (most Františka Jozefa - originally a railway bridge), after WW II. rebuilt in 1946 (Red Army Bridge), old superstructure and 2 pillars demolished and bridge rebuilt in 2013-2016)		
Bridge of the Slovak National Uprising	1869.1	road bridge, bicycles, pedestrians	Bratislava	26 Aug 1972		
Lanfranconi Bridge	1871.35	D2 motorway (Note: also bicycle and pedestrian path, water and gas pipes)	Bratislava	1991		

== Austria ==
Crossing	Distance from mouth (in km)	Carries	Location	Built	Coordinates	Photo
Andreas Maurer bridge	1886.2	Bernstein Straße	Hainburg an der Donau, Engelhartstetten	Dec 1972		
Barbara bridge	1914.4	Gas pipe	Schwechat, Vienna	1957		
Mannswörth pipeline bridge	1917.7	Gas pipe (Note: 20 pipes for natural gas and liquid petroleum products) (Note: Non-public footbridge)	Schwechat, Vienna	1959		
Weir 2 (Note: across New Danube)	1918.3	Footpath	Vienna	1988		
Waluliso Bridge (Note: Across New Danube)		Footpath (Note: Closed in winter and high water)	Vienna	1998		
Freudenauer Hafenbrücke	1921.1	Covered pedestrian/bicycle path with viewing platform	Vienna	1992		
Steinsporn Bridge		Footpath	Vienna	1974		
Stadlau Eastern Railway Bridge	1925	Laaer Ostbahn	Vienna	1931		
Prater Bridge	1925.8	Vienna Southeast Bypass motorway A23	Vienna	1967 (Note: widened and raised 1996-97)		
Danube city bridge	1926	Line U2	Vienna	Mar 1997		
Weir 1 (Note: Across New Danube)	1926.2	Footpath	Vienna	1978		
Kaisermühlen Bridge		Footpath	Vienna	1993		
Reichsbrücke	1928.9	Angerner Straße, U1	Vienna	8 Nov 1980		
Ponte Cagrana (Note: Across New Danube)		pedestrian/bicycle access (Note: closed in winter and high water)	Vienna	2000		
Brigittenauer Bridge	1930.4	Klosterneuburger Straße	Vienna	25 Oct 1982		
Georg Danzer Bridge	1931.2	Line U6	Vienna	1991		
Northern Railway Bridge	1931.2	North railway line	Vienna	1870		
Floridsdorfer Brücke	1931.7	Floridsdorfer Straße	Vienna	1924 (Note: replacing 1874 Franz Joseph Bridge; rebuilt 1945-46)		
Steinitzsteg Footbridge	1932.5	Footpath	Vienna	1995		
North Bridge	1932.6	North Bridge Feeder	Vienna	19 Dec 1964		
Jedleseer Bridge		Footpath	Vienna	1983		
Langenzersdorf intake structure	1938.1	pedestrian/bicycle crossing between Langenzersdorf and the Danube Island	Klosterneuburg, Langenzersdorf	1975		
Greifenstein power station	1949.2	Footpath	Sankt Andrä-Wördern, Spillern	1981		
Donaubrücke Tulln	1963.2	Railway line, Tullner Straße	Tulln an der Donau	1875		
Rose Bridge	1965.4	Tullner Straße	Tulln an der Donau, Langenrohr	1992		
Altenwörth power station	1980.4	Footpath	Altenwörth	1973		
Traismauer Danube motorway bridge	1991.4	S33 expressway	Krems, Gedersdorf, Grafenwörth	31 Oct 2010		
Krems Danube bridge	1999.8	Kremser Straße	Furth bei Göttweig, Krems	1971		
Krems railway bridge	2001.5	Bahnstrecke Krems an der Donau - Herzogenburg	Mautern an der Donau, Krems	1889 (Note: rebuilt 1945)		
Mauterner Donaubrücke	2003.6	Aggsteiner Straße	Krems, Mautern an der Donau	18 May 1895		
Melk Danube Bridge	2034.5	Melker Straße	Emmersdorf an der Donau, Melk	1972		
Melk power station dam	2038	Footpath	Melk, Emmersdorf an der Donau, Zelking-Matzleinsdorf, Leiben	1979		
Pöchlarn Danube bridge	2043.6	Pöchlarner Straße	Pöchlarn	2002		
Persenbeug Dam	2060.4	Erlauftal Straße	Ybbs an der Donau, Hofamt Priel	1959		
Leopold Helbich Bridge	2080.8	Greiner Straße	Grein	1965		
Wallsee-Mitterkirchen power station	2094.5	road (L1427)	Mitterkirchen im Machland	1965		
Mauthausen railway bridge	2111.1	Donauuferbahn, Summerauer Bahn	Mauthausen, Sankt Pantaleon-Erla	1872		
Mauthausen Danube bridge	2111.1	Mauthausener Straße	Mauthausen, Sankt Pantaleon-Erla	1962		
Abwinden-Asten power station	2119.6	Footpath, bikeway	Luftenberg an der Donau	1973		
Steyregg Railway Bridge	2127.6	Summerauer Bahn	Steyregg, Linz	1873		
Steyregger Bridge	2127.7	Donau Straße	Steyregg, Linz	12 Sep 1979		
VÖEST Bridge	2133.5	Mühlkreis Autobahn	Linz	1968		
Eisenbahnbrücke, Linz	2133.9	railway, road (129), pedestrians - to be closed in 2012	Linz	1900		
Nibelungen Bridge	2135.1	Eferdinger Straße	Linz	1938		
Ottensheim-Wilhering power station	2146.7	Footpath, bikeway	Ottensheim	1970		
Aschach Danube Bridge	2160	Aschacher Straße	Aschach an der Donau, Feldkirchen an der Donau	1962		
Niederranna Danube bridge	2194	Niederranna-Wesenufer road (L587)	Hofkirchen im Mühlkreis, Waldkirchen am Wesen	1980		

== Germany ==
Crossing	Distance from mouth (in km)	Carries	Location	Built	Coordinates	Photo
Jochenstein power station	2203.31	Footpath (Note: Openable bridge)	Untergriesbach, Engelhartszell an der Donau	1956, 1952		
Kräutlstein Bridge	2223.29	Passau–Hauzenberg railway	Passau	1903		
Luitpold Bridge	2225.75		Passau	1910		
Schanzl Bridge	2226.98		Passau	1968		
Franz Josef Strauß Bridge	2230.1	Bundesstraße 12	Passau	1989		
Steinbach railway bridge	2230.28	Passau Hbf–Freyung railway	Passau District			
Kachlet power station weir	2230.43	Footpath	Passau			
Schalding motorway bridge	2234.26	Bundesautobahn 3	Passau	1973		
Marienbrücke	2249.16		Vilshofen			
Danube Forest Bridge	2266.23		Winzer			
Deggenau Danube bridge	2282.5	Bundesautobahn 3	Deggendorf	1975		
Maximilian Bridge	2284.6	Staatsstraße 2074	Deggendorf	1999		
Fischerdorf motorway bridge	2285.5	Bundesautobahn 92	Deggendorf	1991		
Donausteg Deggendorf	2285.87	Footpath	Deggendorf	11 Oct 2014		
Deggendorf railway bridge	2285.87	Bavarian Forest Railway	Deggendorf	1877		
Metten motorway bridge	2290.12	Bundesautobahn 3	Metten	1981		
Xaver Hafner Bridge	2308.4		Bogen	19 Sep 1986		
Bogen railway bridge	2311.28	Straubing–Miltach railway	Aiterhofen	1895		
Reibersdorf road bridge	2316.98	Bundesstraße 20	Straubing	1 Jul 1977		
Schloßbrücke	2321.33	Chamer Straße, Bavarian State Route 2141	Straubing	1949		
Agnes Bernauer Bridge	2320	Bavarian State Route 2141	Straubing	Nov 1981		
Kagerser Bridge	2321.82	Straubing west bypass	Straubing	7 Aug 1992		
Donaubrücke Pfatter	2353.33	Bavarian State Route 2146	Wörth an der Donau			
Wörth Danube Bridge	2358.27	Bundesautobahn 3	Wörth an der Donau	1979		
Donaustauf road bridge	2369.65	Bavarian State Route 2145	Donaustauf	1985		
Schwabelweis road bridge	2376.32	Bundesstraße 8, Bundesstraße 15	Regensburg	1981		
Schwabelweis railway bridge	2376.82	Regensburg–Weiden railway	Schwabelweis	1933		
Nibelungen Bridge	2378.39	Bundesstraße 15	Regensburg	2004 (Note: Other bridges were built 1935–1938; 1950; 2001–04)		
Gries foot and bicycle bridge (Note: Between island Wöhrd and Stadtamhof)	2379.27	Footpath	Regensburg District			
Iron Bridge	2379.26		Regensburg	1991		
Protzenweiher Bridge (Note: Across Rhine-Main-Danube Canal (now closed to traffic))	2379.56		Regensburg	2011		
Stone Bridge	2379.62		Regensburg	1146		
Eiserner Steg	2380.07	Footpath	Regensburg	1948		
Pfaffenstein footbridge (Note: Between island (Wöhrd) and Stadtamhof)	2380.12	Footpath	Regensburg			
Upper Palatinate Bridge (Note: Across the Rhine–Main–Danube Canal)	2380.17		Regensburg			
Regensburg hydroelectric power station	2381	Footbridge	Regensburg			
Pfaffenstein motorway bridge	2381.11	Bundesautobahn 93	Regensburg	1967		
Mariaort railway bridge	2385.68	Nuremberg–Regensburg railway	Mariaort	1872		
Sinzing railway bridge	2386.71	Danube Valley Railway	Sinzing			
Sinzing motorway bridge	2387.6	Bundesautobahn 3	Regensburg	1966		
Bad Abbach power station	2400.24		Bad Abbach			
Poikam railway bridge	2401.96	Regensburg–Ingolstadt railway	Poikam			
Saal road bridge	2410.1		Saal an der Donau			
Kelheim Europa Bridge	2412.72		Kelheim	1977		
Kelheim Maximilian Bridge	2414.25		Kelheim			
Neustadt road bridge	2432.4	Bundesstraße 299	Neustadt an der Donau			
Pförring road bridge			Pförring			
New Danube Bridge			Vohburg an der Donau (Note: road bridge bypassing town centre)			
Old Danube Bridge		Bundesstraße 16a	Vohburg an der Donau			
Vohburg weir			Vohburg an der Donau			
Großmehring road bridge			Großmehring			
Motorway bridge A9		Bundesautobahn 9	Ingolstadt			
Schiller bridge		Bundesstraße 13	Ingolstadt	1963		
Ingolstadt Rail Bridge		Nuremberg–Ingolstadt high speed railway	Ingolstadt	1922 (Note: also 1869, 1999–2001)		
Donausteg			Ingolstadt			
Konrad-Adenauer-Brücke			Ingolstadt	1948		
Glacis Bridge		Bundesstraße 13, Ringstraße	Ingolstadt	1998		
Ingolstadt power station dam			Ingolstadt	1971		
Bergheim power station dam			Bergheim, Neuburg an der Donau	1970		
Elise bridge			Neuburg an der Donau			
Bittenbrunn power station dam			Neuburg an der Donau	1969		
Bertoldsheim power station dam			Rennertshofen	1967		
Marxheim Danube Bridge			Marxheim			
Schäfstall Bridge			Schäfstall			
B2 road bridge		Bundesstraße 2	Donauwörth			
Donauwörth Danube bridge			Donauwörth			
Donauwörth Railway bridge		Danube Valley Railway	Donauwörth			
Kesseldamm Bridge		Bundesstraße 16	Donauwörth			
Donauwörth power station dam			Donauwörth			
Donaubrücke Donaumünster			Donaumünster	2007		
Schwenningen power station			Schwenningen	1983		
Donaubrücke Gremheim			Gremheim			
Donaubrücke Bruckmahdseen			Blindheim			
Road bridge			Höchstädt an der Donau			
Donaubrücke Steinheim			Steinheim			
Donausteg Oberelchingen	2576		Elchingen			
Donausteg			Ulm, Neu-Ulm	1976		
Gänstor Bridge	2584.9	Brückenstraße	Ulm, Neu-Ulm	1950		
Herd Bridge	2585.5	Marienstraße	Stadtmitte	1948		
Donaueschingen road bridge		Bundesstraße 27	Donaueschingen			
