= Monostori Bridge =

Bridge in Komárno, Slovakia and Komárom, Hungary

Monostori Bridge Monostori híd
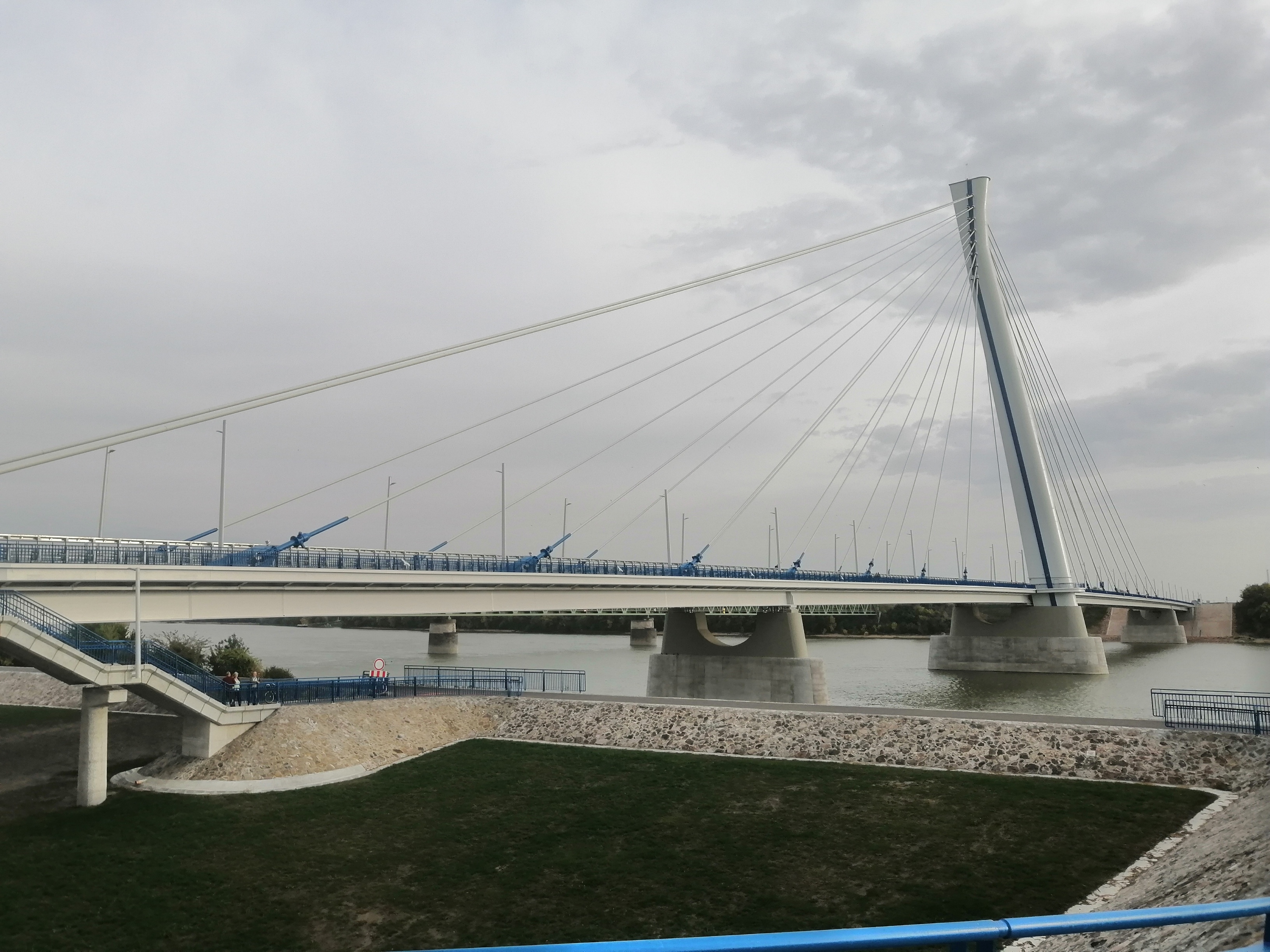
- Coordinates: 47°45′23″N 18°05′05″E
- Crosses: Danube
- Locale: Komárom, Hungary; Komárno, Slovakia

Characteristics
- Design: Cable-stayed bridge, beam bridge
- Total length: 622.69 m (2,042.9 ft)
- Width: 22.4 m (73 ft)
- Height: 96.46 m (316.5 ft)
- Longest span: 252 m (827 ft)

History
- Designer: Komárno Consortium (Dopravoprojekt and Pont-Terv)

Location
- Interactive map of Monostori Bridge

Monostori Bridge (Hungarian: Monostori híd, Slovak: Monoštorský most) is a bridge crossing the Danube river, which connects North and South Komárom, in Slovakia and Hungary.

The foundation stone for the bridge was laid on October 17, 2017, the track was completed in December 2019, and it was handed over on September 17, 2020.

== Purpose ==
The load-bearing capacity of the new bridge opened up the possibility of carrying heavy vehicle traffic, thus significantly contributing to the further development of the region. Reduces traffic through the two downtown areas of Komárom and the Erzsébet Bridge connecting the twin cities. The accession of Hungary and Slovakia to the European Union further enhanced the role of the bridge, which is why the construction of the bridge could be realized with European Union funds.

=== Planning ===
The bilateral expert working group coordinating the construction tasks of the new Danube Bridge held its first meeting on November 27, 2013. The expected investment cost was estimated at HUF 25 billion, and the start of construction of the bridge was scheduled for 2016.

== Execution ==
The foundation stone of the bridge was laid on October 17, 2017.

== See also ==
- Fort Monostor
- List of crossings of the Danube
