= Megyeri Bridge =

Megyeri Bridge Megyeri Híd
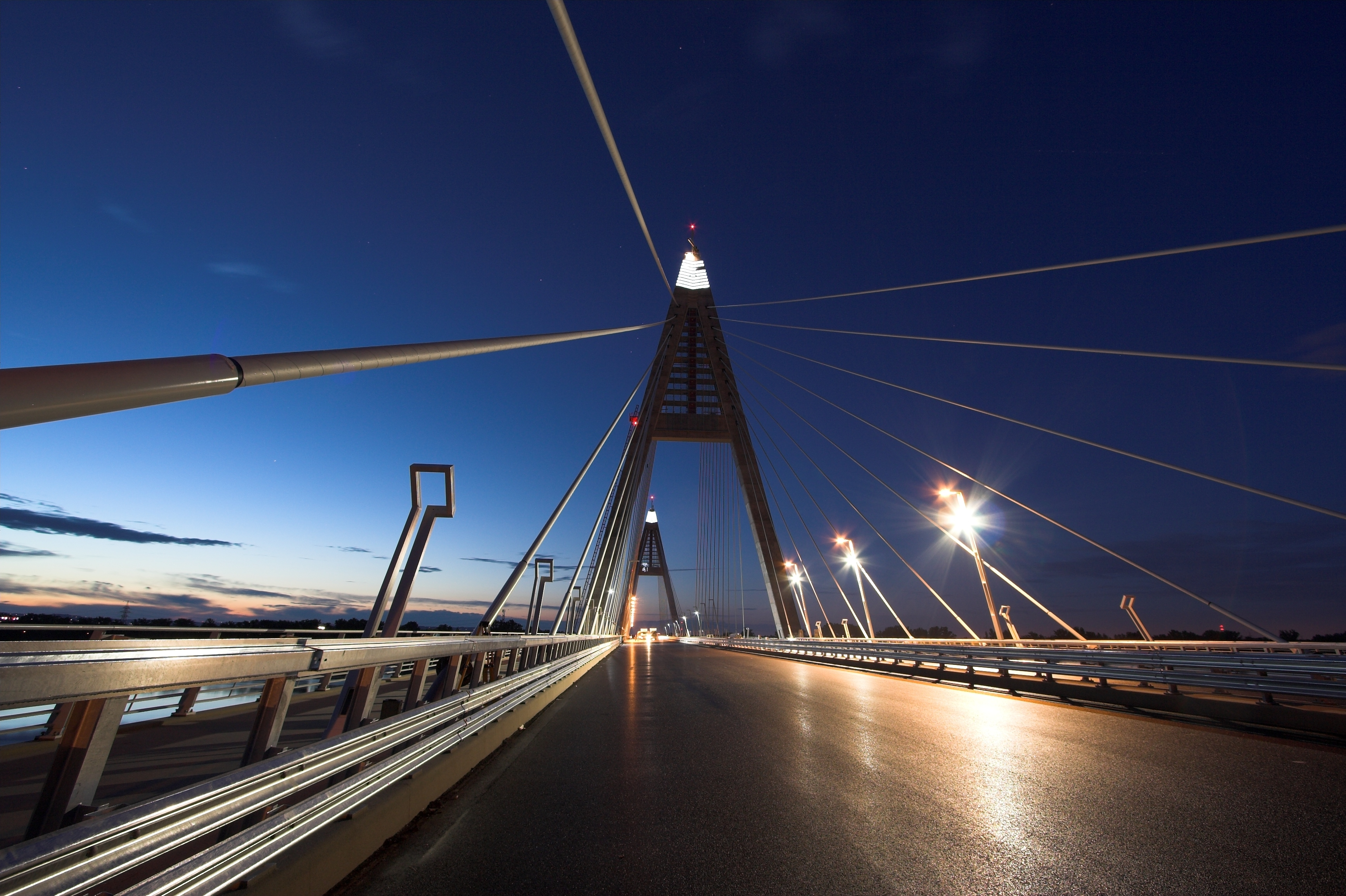
- Megyeri Bridge at night
- Coordinates: 47.60722°N 19.09222°E
- Carries: M0 beltway of Budapest
- Crosses: Danube
- Locale: Budapest

Characteristics
- Design: cable-stayed bridge
- Total length: 1,862 m (6,109 ft)
- Height: 100 m (328 ft)
- Longest span: 300 m (984 ft)
- Clearance below: 30 m (98 ft)

History
- Opened: September 30, 2008

Location
- Interactive map of Megyeri Bridge

The Megyeri Bridge (Hungarian: Megyeri Híd, Hungarian pronunciation: [ˈmɛɟɛri ˈhiːd]), previously known as the Northern M0 Danube bridge, is a cable-stayed bridge that spans the River Danube between Buda and Pest, respectively the west and east sides of Budapest, the capital of Hungary. It is an important section of the M0 ringroad around Budapest.

The bridge cost 63 billion forints (approx. US$300M) and was officially opened on September 30, 2008; however, the National Transport Authority of Hungary has only issued temporary permits because of disagreement among suburban cities surrounding the bridge.

An online naming poll to determine the new name of the recently built bridge caused controversy and received media attention when American comedians Stephen Colbert and Jon Stewart won. Hungary eventually named it the Megyeri Bridge.

== Gallery ==
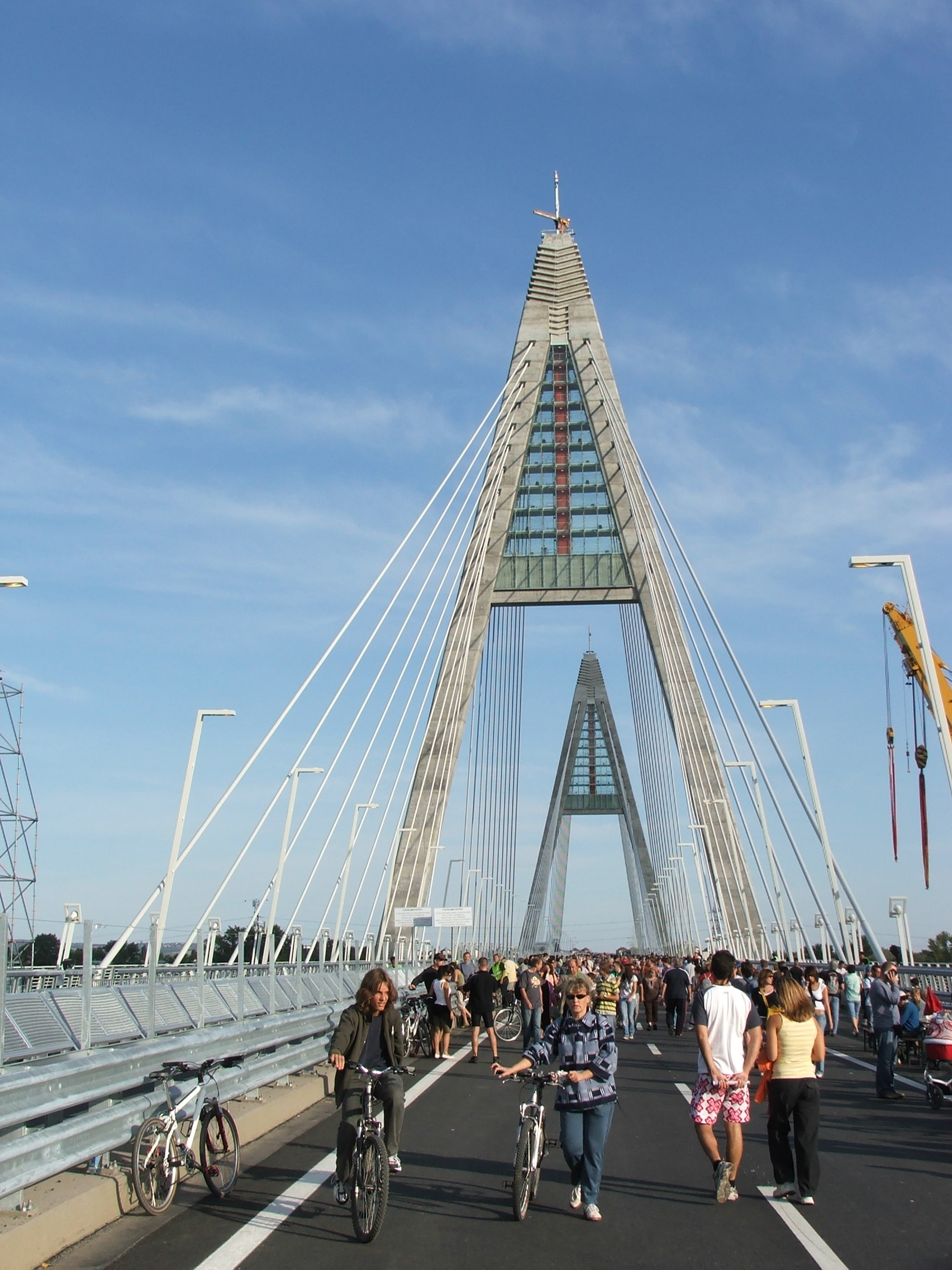

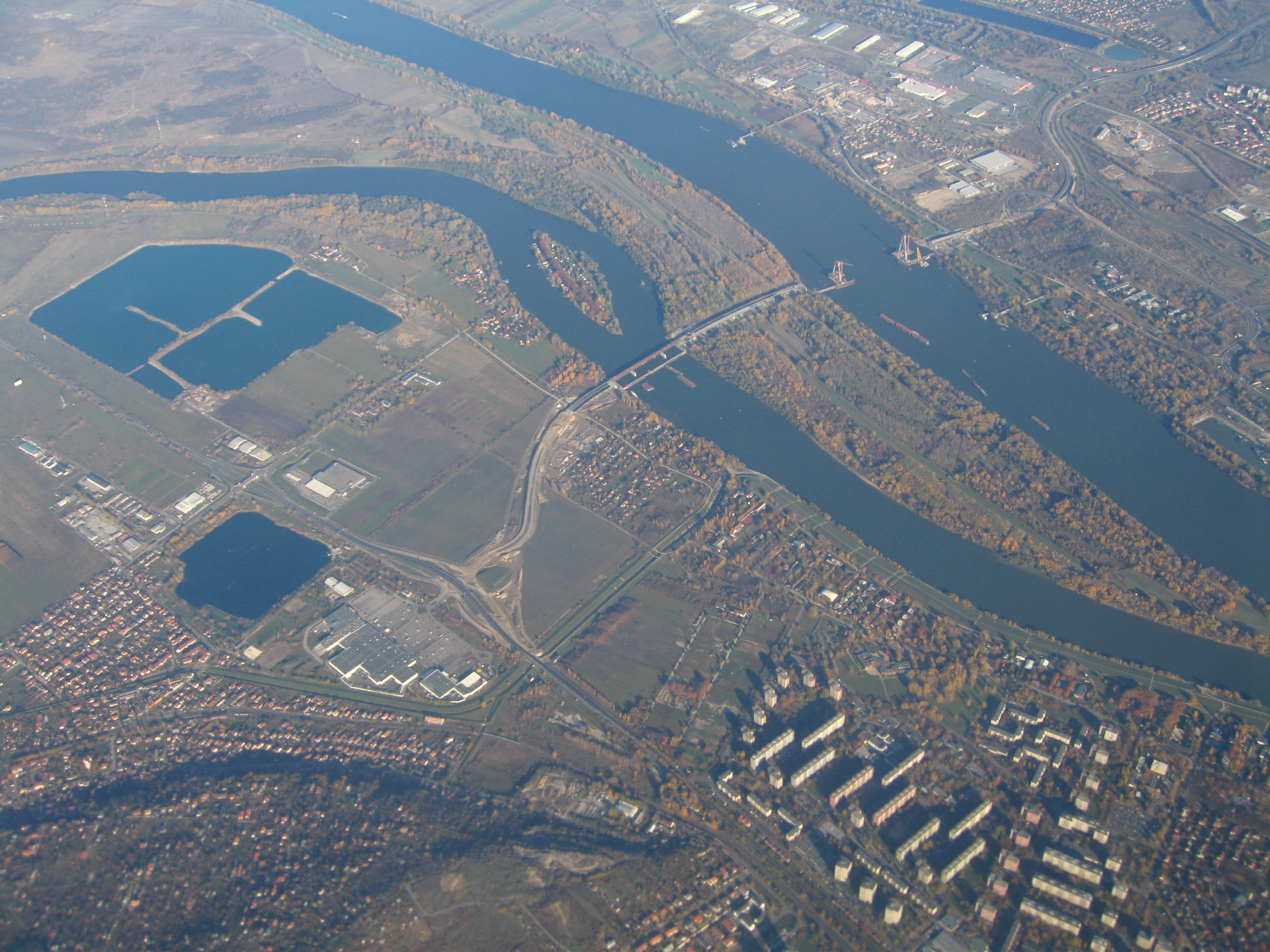

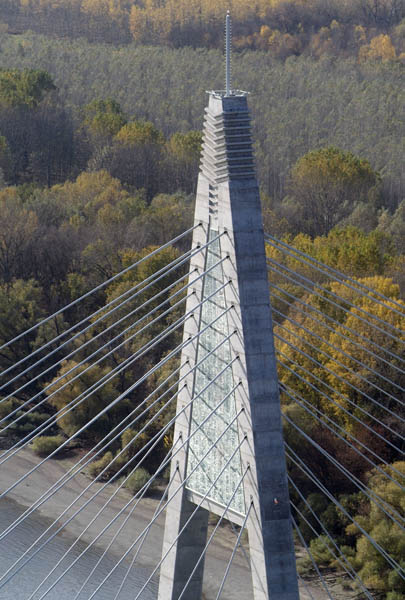

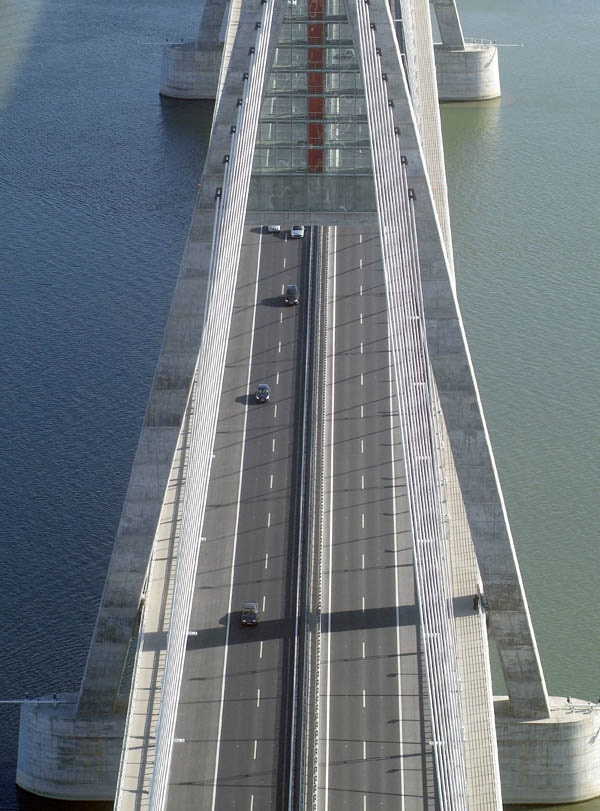

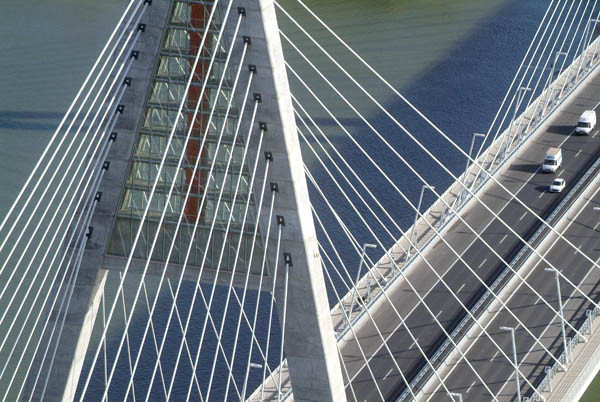

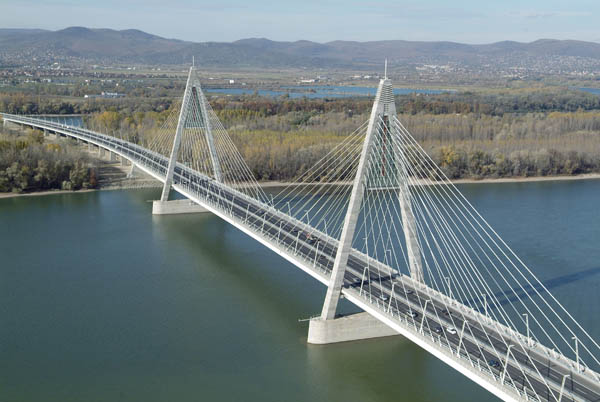

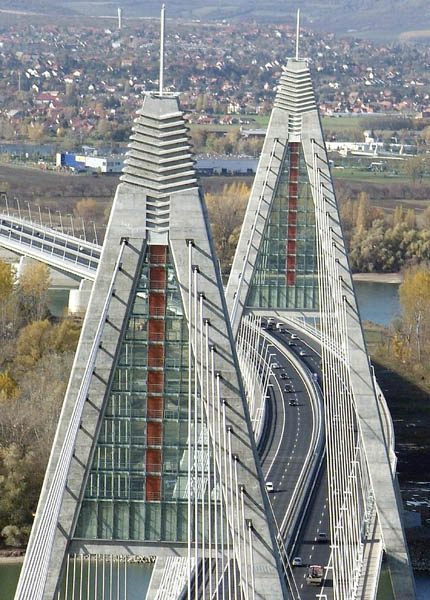

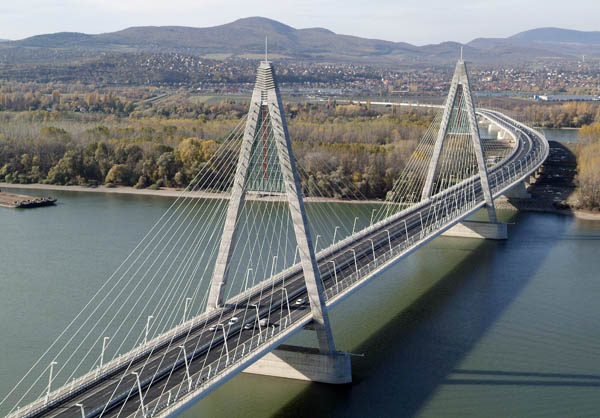

== Technical information ==
The total length of the bridge is 1862m. Structurally it is composed of five parts:

1. Left quayside inundation area bridge: 148m
2. Main Danube-branch bridge (cable stayed): 590m with a span of 300m
3. Szentendre Island inundation area bridge: 559m
4. Szentendre Danube-branch bridge: 332m
5. Right quayside inundation area bridge: 218m

== Naming poll ==
The Ministry of Economic Affairs and Transport of Hungary organized a public vote online to solicit possible names for the new bridge. The three names with the most votes, as well as suggestions from local governments, cartographers, linguists and other experts, were to be reviewed by a government committee before a final name for the bridge was chosen. New nominations were accepted until August 21, 2006, and the voting ended on September 8, 2006.

At one point, the top candidate according to the online poll was "Chuck Norris híd", named for American action star Chuck Norris. (Chuck Norris facts reached the height of their popularity around this time.) On August 9, 2006, American satirist Stephen Colbert discussed the story on his comedy program The Colbert Report, instructing his viewers to visit the polling website and vote for him instead of Norris. On August 15, 2006, he repeated his call to be voted top of the Hungarian poll. The next day the number of votes for him had grown 230 times, and he now asked his viewers to follow a link from his own "Colbert Nation" website, to avoid "all that illegible Hungarian". Colbert's site also indirectly offered techniques for "stuffing the ballot box", as users of their forums created several automated scripts to cast multiple votes for Colbert. By August 22, 2006, the "Stephen Colbert híd" was in first with 17 million votes, about 14 million votes ahead of the second-placed Zrínyi híd, named after the Croatian-Hungarian national hero, Miklós Zrínyi, and about 7 million more than the entire population of Hungary. The same day, the site announced a new round of voting, which would require registration to participate, and Colbert asked his viewers to "call off the dogs", requesting on his website that fans stop using scripts to vote. Despite this, the "Stephen Colbert híd" remained in the top position on the website in the second round.

On September 14, 2006, András Simonyi—the ambassador of Hungary to the United States—announced on The Colbert Report that Stephen Colbert had won the vote. Unfortunately for Colbert, Ambassador Simonyi declared that under Hungarian law, Colbert would have to be fluent in Hungarian, and would have to be deceased in order to have the bridge named for him. However, after saying the rules could most likely be bent, he invited Colbert to visit Hungary and view the construction in person and gave him a Hungarian passport and a 10,000 HUF Bill, with an approximate value of, as the ambassador put it, 'fifty dollars, fifty good US dollars'. Colbert promptly tried to bribe him with said money.

=== Results ===
Round 1 Top Five
Name	Votes	Percentage
Stephen Colbert híd	17231725	53%
Zrínyi híd	2062649	6%
Pató Pál híd	1805118	6%
Bethlen Gábor híd	1735587	5%
Hunyadi Mátyás híd	1478020	5%

Round 2 Top Five
Name	Votes	Percentage
Stephen Colbert híd	93163	25%
Jon Stewart híd	85171	23%
Zrínyi híd	83966	23%
Eötvös híd	37042	10%
Perl-Script híd	17354	5%

=== Megyeri Bridge ===
On September 28, 2006, it was announced that the bridge will be named "Megyeri Bridge", even though that name did not make it to the second round. The Hungarian Geographical Name Committee justified the final name by explaining that the bridge connects Káposztásmegyer and Békásmegyer.

== See also ==
- List of crossings of the Danube River
