= M0 motorway =

Road in Hungary

M0 motorway
- M0-s autópálya
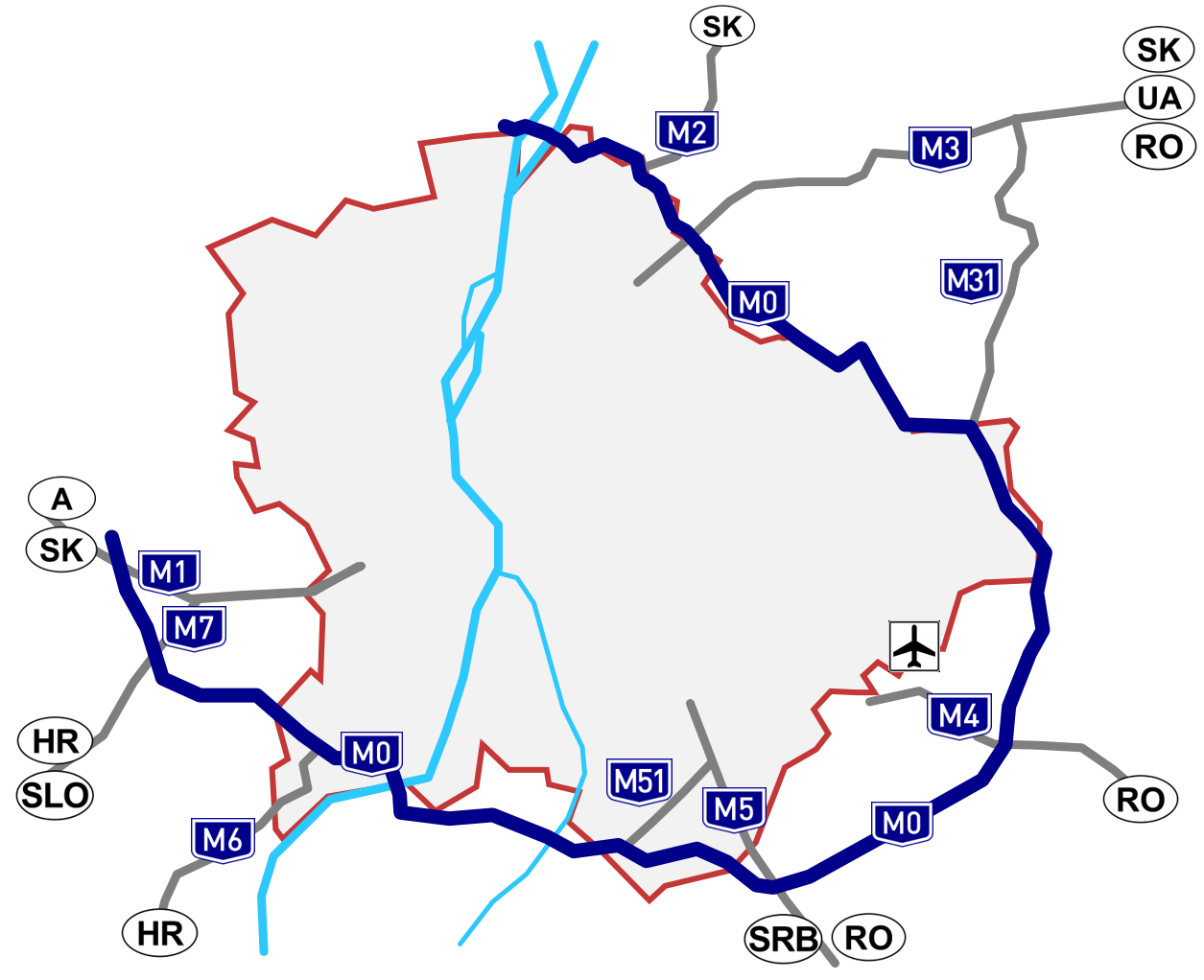

Route information
- Part of E60 E71 E75 E77
- Length: 79 km (49 mi) 108 km (67 mi) planned

Location
- Country: Hungary
- Counties: Pest, Budapest

Highway system
- Roads in Hungary; Highways; Main roads; Local roads

The M0 motorway is a ring road around Budapest, the capital of Hungary. The ring presently connects motorways M1, M7, M6, M5, M4, M3, M2, connecting currently to Highway 11. The whole length of the motorway is planned at about 108 km. About 78 km have been completed as of 2013.

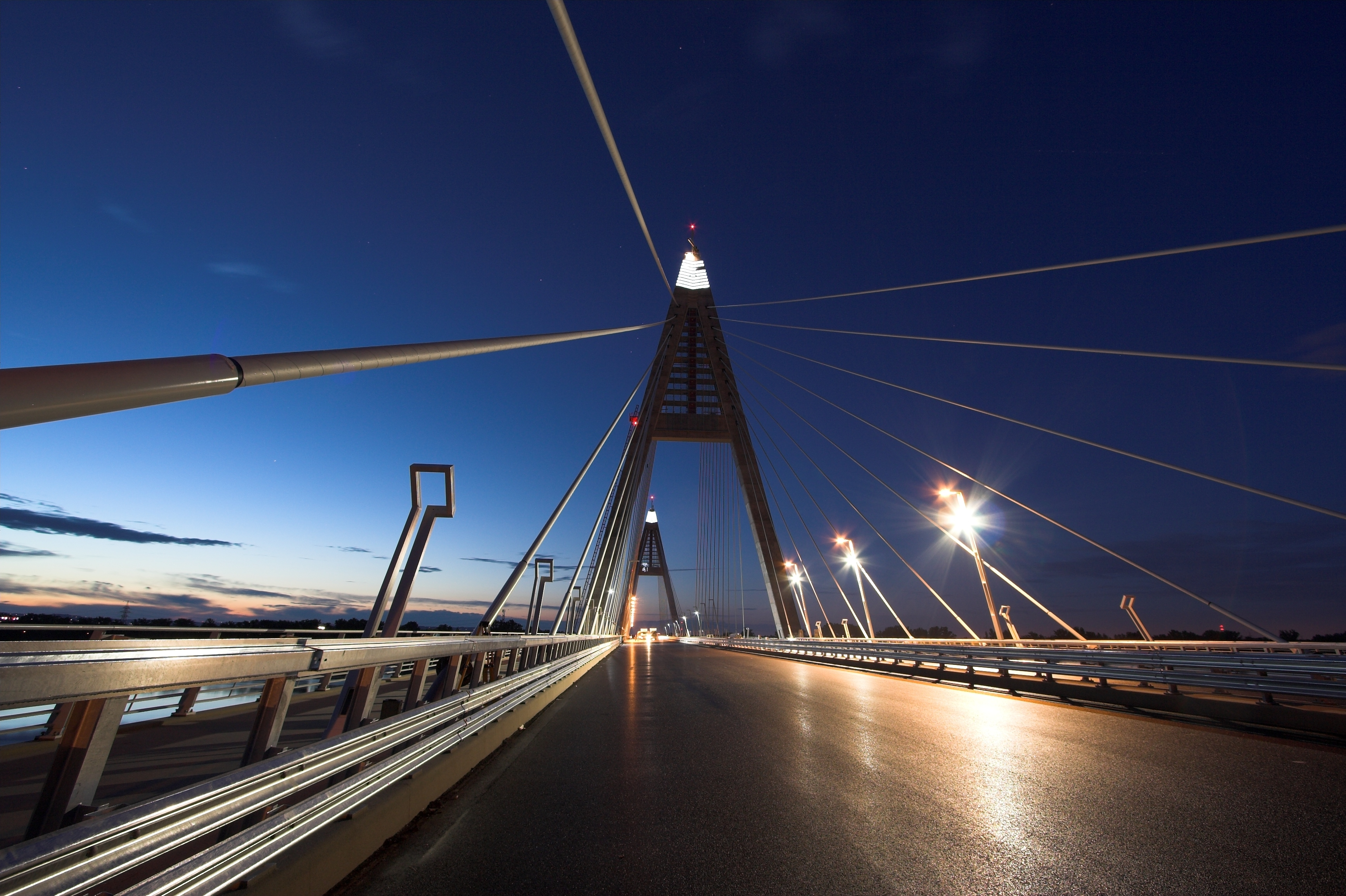
Megyeri Bridge

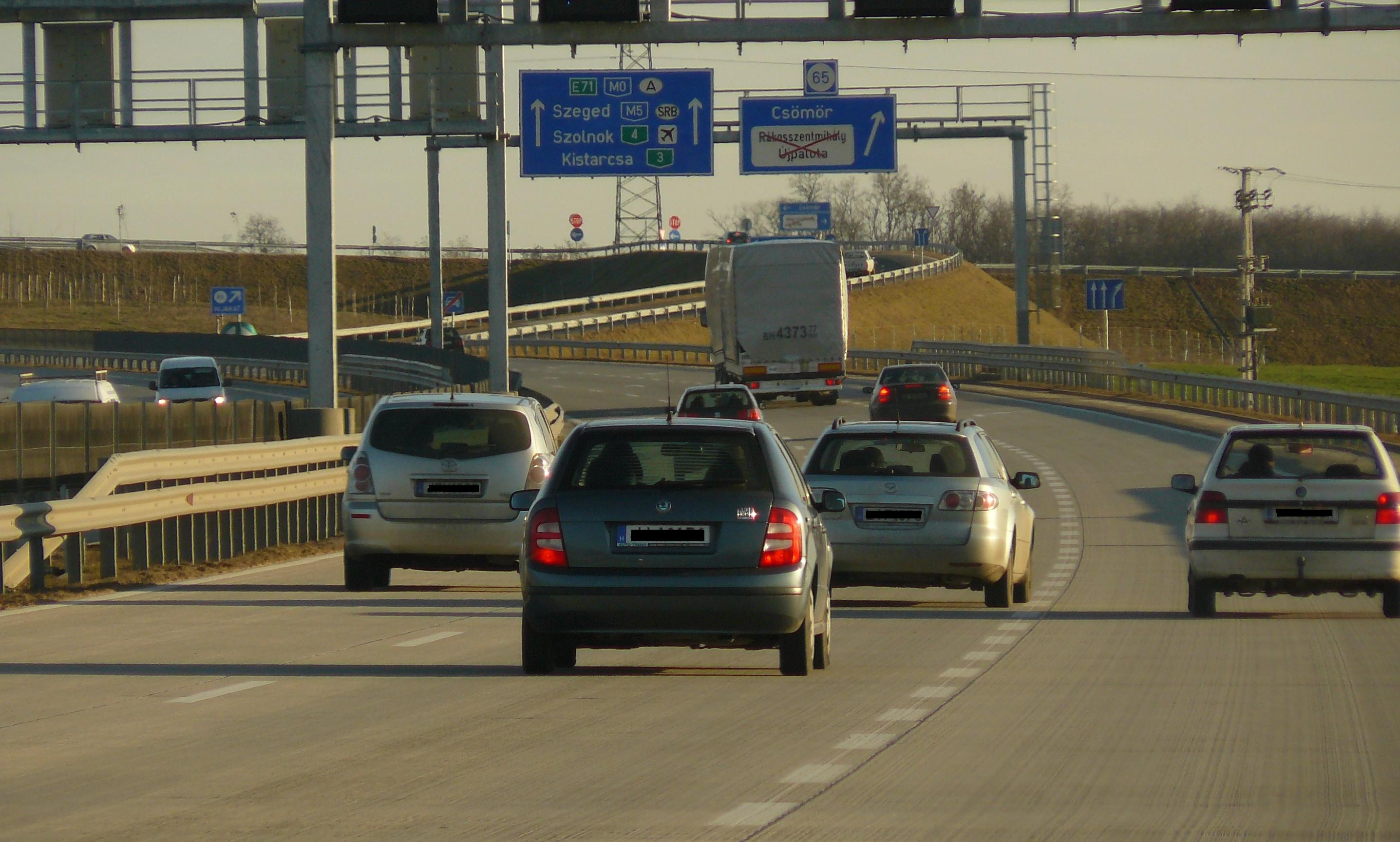
M0 eastern sector

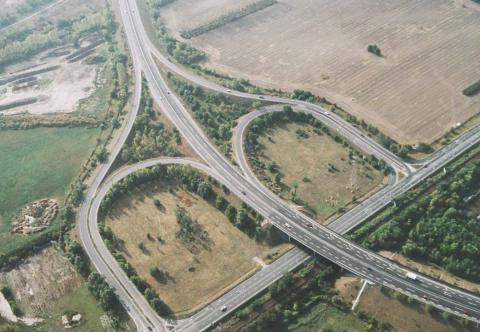
Aerial photography of the M0 motorway

== Sections ==
=== M1-M7-M6-M5 section (South) ===
The 29 kilometer long section between M1 and M5 is the oldest section of the M0 motorway and was built between 1988 and 1995. It originally did not comply with formal motorway specifications; it was built as a 2+2 lanes road without hard shoulders. Speed limit on this section was 80 km/h. Initially there were no jersey barriers between the two lanes in each direction, they had to be added some years after the road was completed because reckless drivers overtook in the opposite lane causing many fatal frontal crashes. Small bridges in this section were initially built twice as wide as necessary, because a widening of the road was already anticipated in the original plans.

The widening happened in 2011 and 2013, since then most of this busy section (except for the short section between M1 and M7) has got 4x(3+1 emergency) lanes, and speed limits were raised to 110 km/h.

The southern section upgraded to a six-lane motorway was delivered between M1 and Highway 51 on 30 June 2013. The section between Highway 51 and M5 was renamed Highway M51 when a new section directly connected the M1-M5 section to the M5-M4 section of the M0. This new section was completed on 31 August 2013. Before the new section was completed, M0 shared a section with highway M5 (see the map to the right). The short section between M1 and M7 was upgraded to a six-lane motorway in 2015.

=== M5-M4 section ===
The 12 kilometre long section between M5 and the initial section of the future M4 was completed in 2005. Maximum speed on this section is 110 km per hour.

=== M4-M3 section (East) ===
The 26 kilometre long section between M4 and M3 was completed in September 2008.

=== M3-Megyeri Bridge section ===
The 7 kilometre long section between M3 and the Megyeri Bridge was opened before it connected to the rest of the M0 and was known as Highway 2/B and Highway 2/A. Both 2/B and 2/A are four-lane highways, but Highway 2/A does not feature a median between the lanes. Maximum speeds on Highway 2/A are 80 kilometers per hour. It was renamed to M0 when the M5-M3 section was completed. Also opened in September 2008, the Megyeri Bridge further connects M0 to Highway 11.

=== Highway 11-Highway 10 section ===
The 9 kilometre section between Highway 11 and Highway 10 is planned but construction is not scheduled yet. A stub ramp near its current terminus may indicate the planned routing of the new section.

=== Highway 10-M1 section ===
This is the 18 kilometre long remaining section between Highway 10 and the oldest part of the M0 beginning at the M1 interchange.

== Junctions, exits and rest area ==
Signs	Distance	Destinations	Note
	(-1 km)	Budaörs - Tatabánya	
	(0 km)	M1 motorway (Hungary) European route E60 European route E75	The M1 turns toward Győr -> (Austria)
	(2 km)	Törökbálint	
	(3 km)	Dulácska völgyhíd - 170 m	
	(4 km)	M7 motorway (Hungary) European route E71	The M7 turns toward the Balaton -> (Croatia)
	(6 km)	Anna-hegyi rest area	MOL / OMV, McDonald's
	(10 km)	Diósd - Nagykanizsa	
	(11 km)	M6 motorway (Hungary) European route E73	The M6 turns toward Mohács -> (Croatia)
	(12 km)	Nagytétény / Budatétény	
	(13 km)	Nagytétényi út - 235 m	
	(14 km)	Budafok - Pécs	
	(15 km)	Ferenc Deák Bridge over Danube river - 770 m	
	(16 km)	Halásztelek / Csepel	
	(19 km)	Szigetszentmiklós / Csepel	
	(19 km)	Csepeli rest area	OMV, Shell
		Soroksári Bridge over Danube river - 499 m	
	(23 km)	Dunaharaszti / Soroksár - Baja	
	(24 km)	M51 expressway (Hungary)	Part of old M0 bypass
	(25 km)	Soroksár - Kecskemét	
	(31 km)	M5 motorway (Hungary) European route E75	The M5 turns toward Szeged -> (Serbia)
	(34 km)	Pestszentimre	
	(37 km)	Gyál	
	(38 km)	Alacskai rest area	MOL / MOL
	(42 km)	/ AIRPORT	The M4 turns toward Szolnok -> (Romania)
	(46 km)	Ecser	
	(48 km)	Maglód / Rákoskeresztúr - Jászberény	
	(52 km)	Pécel / Rákoscsaba	
	(53 km)	bridge over Rákos-patak	
	(54 km)	M31 motorway (Hungary)	transit road to M3
	(55 km)	Nagytarcsa / Rákosliget	
	(58 km)	Nagytarcsa / Cinkota	
	(60 km)	Cinkota / Kistarcsa - Miskolc	
	(65 km)	Csömör / Újpalota	
	(69 km)	M3 motorway (Hungary) European route E71	The M3 turns toward Nyíregyháza -> (Ukraine)
	(70 km)	Fót / Rákospalota	
	(72 km)	European route E77	The M2 turns toward Vác -> (Slovakia)
	(73 km)	Dunakeszi	
	(75 km)	Újpest - Vác	
	(76 km)	Megyeri Bridge over Danube river - 1 852 m	
	(78 km)	Budakalász / Békásmegyer - Szentendre	

== Archeological research ==
Between 2001–2006 an archeological site of great scientific importance was unearthed when building the southeastern sector of the M0 motorway.
