= Hofkirchen im Mühlkreis =

- Municipality
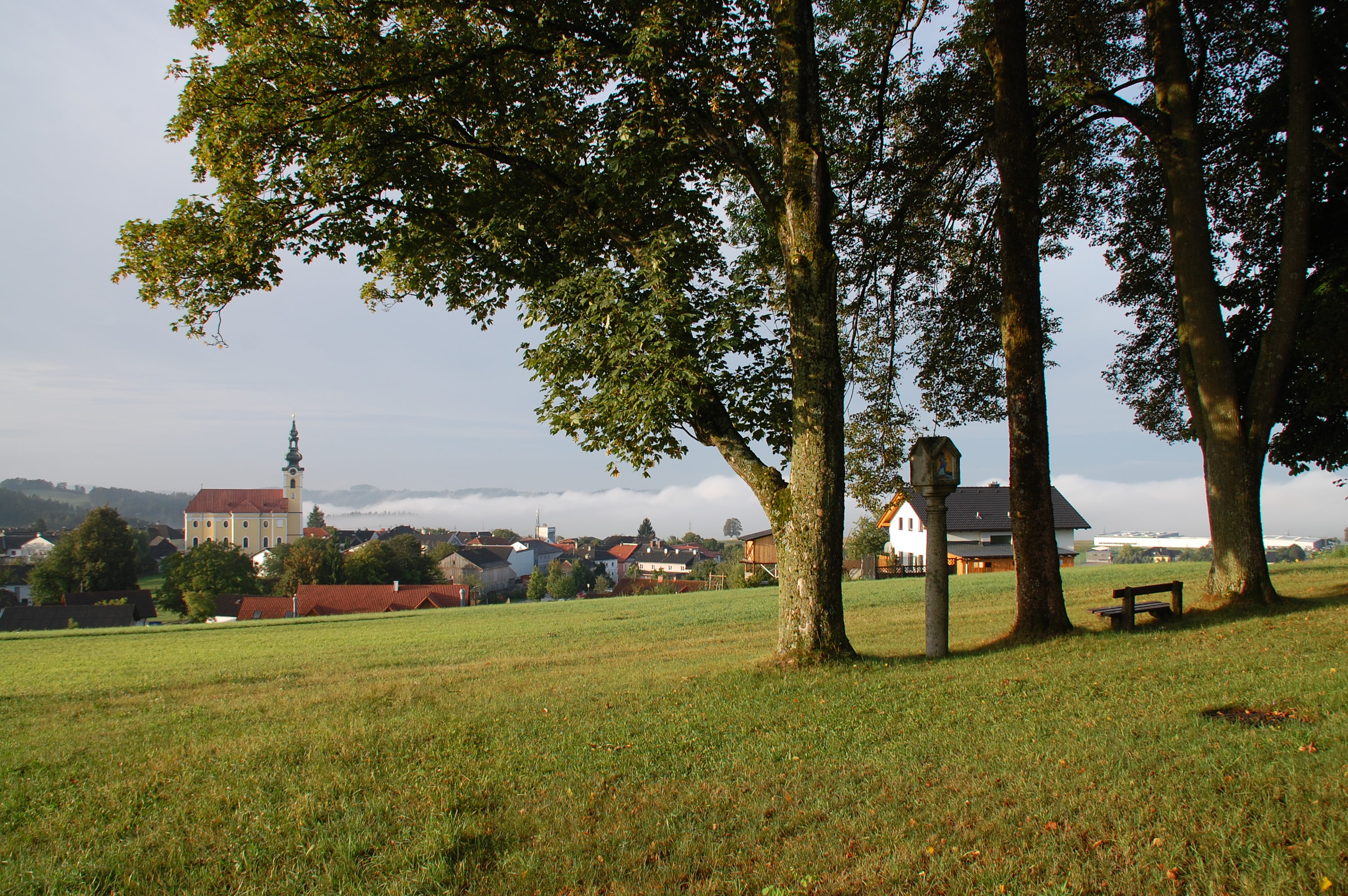

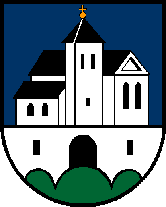
- Coat of arms

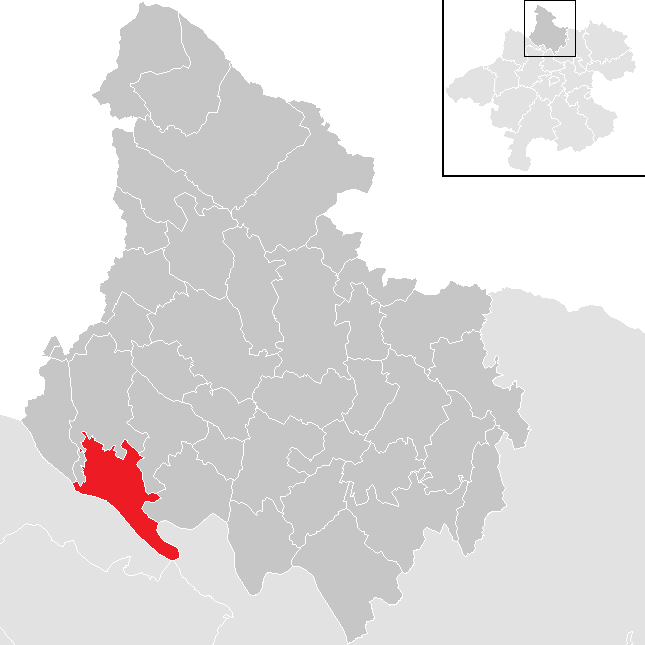
- Location in the district

- Location within Austria
- Coordinates: 48°29′02″N 13°48′43″E
- Country: Austria
- State: Upper Austria
- District: Rohrbach

Government
  - Mayor: Martin Raab (ÖVP)

Area
  - Total: 22.68 km^{2} (8.76 sq mi)
- Elevation: 601 m (1,972 ft)

Population (2018-01-01)
  - Total: 1,520
  - Density: 67.0/km^{2} (174/sq mi)
- Time zone: UTC+1 (CET)
  - Summer (DST): UTC+2 (CEST)
- Postal code: 4142
- Area code: 0 72 85
- Vehicle registration: RO
- Website: www.hofkirchen.at

Hofkirchen im Mühlkreis is a municipality in the district of Rohrbach in the Austrian state of Upper Austria.

== Population ==
Historical population
| Year | Pop. | ±% |
|---|---|---|
| 1869 | 1,515 | — |
| 1880 | 1,522 | +0.5% |
| 1890 | 1,406 | −7.6% |
| 1900 | 1,305 | −7.2% |
| 1910 | 1,312 | +0.5% |
| 1923 | 1,336 | +1.8% |
| 1934 | 1,346 | +0.7% |
| 1939 | 1,403 | +4.2% |
| 1951 | 1,336 | −4.8% |
| 1961 | 1,384 | +3.6% |
| 1971 | 1,339 | −3.3% |
| 1981 | 1,415 | +5.7% |
| 1991 | 1,427 | +0.8% |
| 2001 | 1,436 | +0.6% |
| 2011 | 1,423 | −0.9% |
| 2017 | 1,511 | +6.2% |
