= Steyregger Bridge =

Concrete bridge that crosses the Danube in Linz

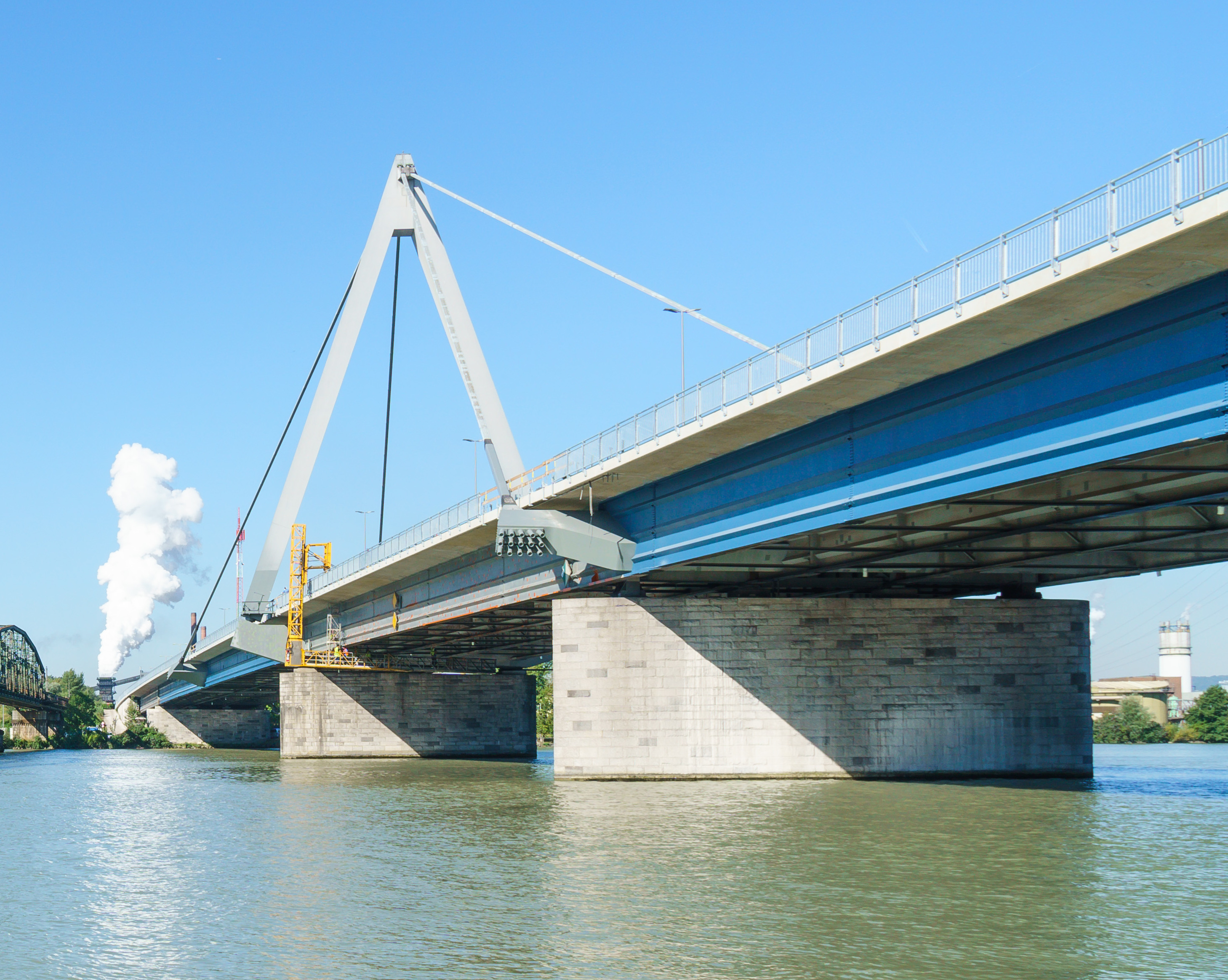
- The bridge, as seen in 2017
- Coordinates: 48°17′13″N 14°20′36″E
- Locale: Linz, Austria

Characteristics
- Design: Cable-stayed
- Material: Concrete
- Total length: 453 meters
- Width: 25 meters

History
- Construction start: 1976
- Construction end: 1979
- Opened: September 12, 1979

Location
- Interactive map of Steyregger Bridge

The Steyregger Bridge is a concrete bridge that crosses the Danube in the Upper Austrian capital of Linz.

== Location and history ==
The Steyregger Bridge is located immediately north/upstream of the older Steyregg railway bridge. On the Steyregger Ufer the distance between the centers of the bridge is around 75 meters, on the Linzer Ufer it is only 30 meters.

It connects Linz in the west with Steyregg in the east of the Danube River, which flows south-southeast. It is part of Donau-Straße (B 3) and has 2×2 lanes that are separated from each other and from the side sidewalks and cycle paths by guardrails. On the Linzer Ufer, the B 3 separates the operating areas of the Linz Chemical Park from the voestalpine Hütten- und Stahlwerke.

It was opened on September 12, 1979, after three years of construction. The first plans to build the road bridge were already in 1914.

== Construction ==
The 453.6 m long and 254.86 m wide bridge has an A-shaped, 44 m high pylon, which is articulated on the cantilever arms of the pylon cross beam on the stream pillar. Its head is braced to the carriageway support with two cables on each side. It has five openings with spans of 50.6 + 161.0 + 3 × 80.6 m, with which it bridges the edge of the bank of the industrial area, the main channel of the Danube, its edge areas and the flood zone.

Its bridge deck is a composite construction made of four steel solid wall girders and a 20 cm thick reinforced concrete slab.

The bridge was built on behalf of the Upper Austrian state government in a joint venture between the construction companies Hamberger Baugesellschaft, Mayreder Krauss & Co and Porr AG in collaboration with VOEST-Alpine. The planning and construction management was carried out by Waagner-Biro.

== See also ==
- List of bridges in Germany
