= Zelking-Matzleinsdorf =

- Municipality
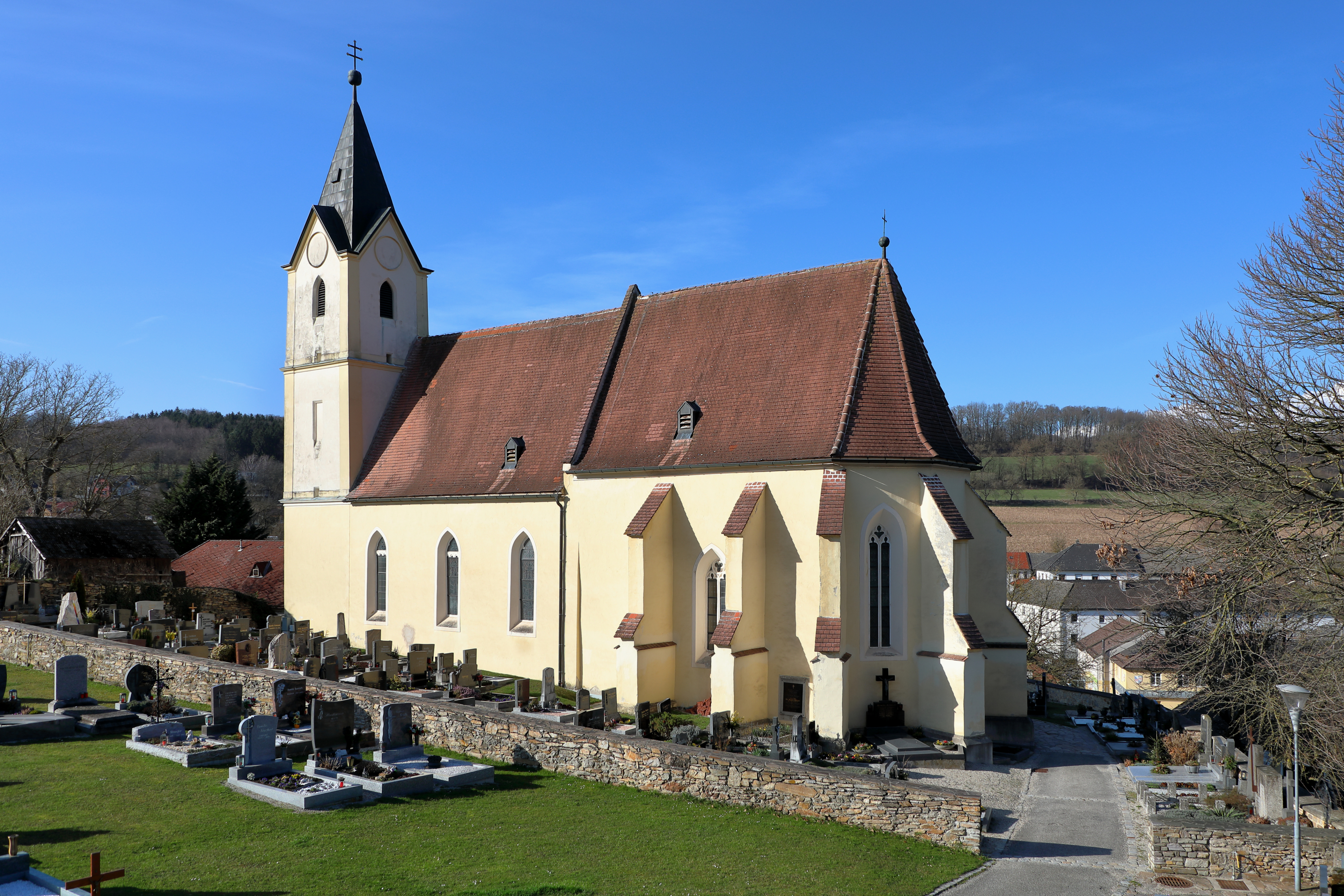
- Zelking parish church

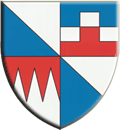
- Coat of arms

- Location within Austria
- Coordinates: 48°1′N 15°16′E
- Country: Austria
- State: Lower Austria
- District: Melk

Government
  - Mayor: Gerhard Bürg

Area
  - Total: 21.19 km^{2} (8.18 sq mi)
- Elevation: 238 m (781 ft)

Population (2018-01-01)
  - Total: 1,214
  - Density: 57.29/km^{2} (148.4/sq mi)
- Time zone: UTC+1 (CET)
  - Summer (DST): UTC+2 (CEST)
- Postal code: 3393
- Area code: 02752
- Website: www.zelking-matzleinsdorf.gv.at

Zelking-Matzleinsdorf is a town in the district of Melk in the Austrian state of Lower Austria.

== Population ==
Historical population
Year	Pop.	±%
1971	1,152	—
1981	1,253	+8.8%
1991	1,196	−4.5%
2001	1,227	+2.6%
2018	1,214	−1.1%
