= St. Pantaleon-Erla =

Sankt Pantaleon-Erla
- Municipality
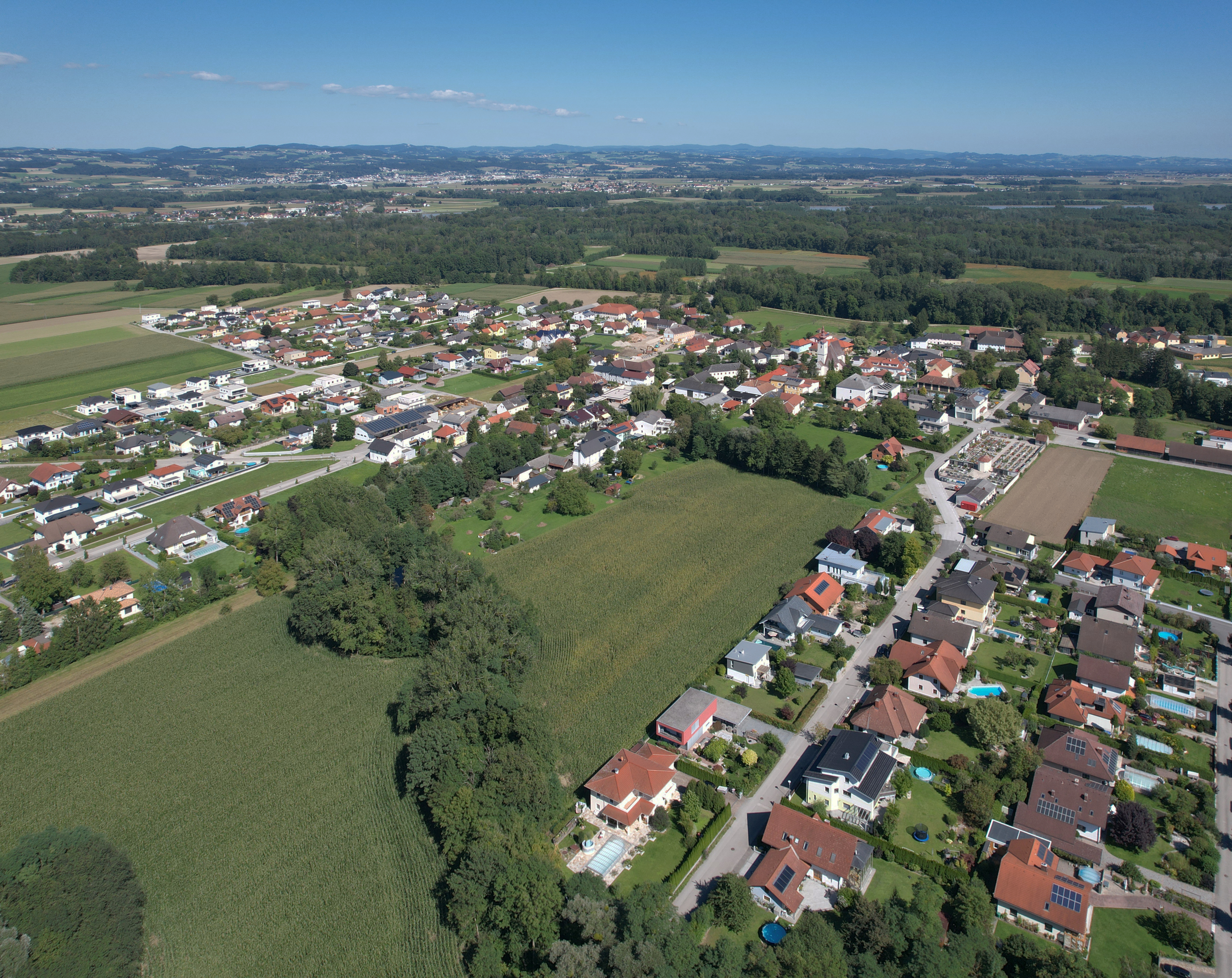
- Aerial view

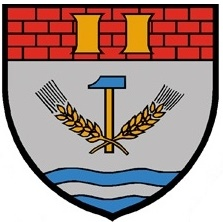
- Coat of arms

- Location within Austria
- Coordinates: 48°12′N 14°34′E
- Country: Austria
- State: Lower Austria
- District: Amstetten

Government
  - Mayor: Rudolf Bscheid

Area
  - Total: 28.38 km^{2} (10.96 sq mi)
- Elevation: 242 m (794 ft)

Population (2018-01-01)
  - Total: 2,587
  - Density: 91.16/km^{2} (236.1/sq mi)
- Time zone: UTC+1 (CET)
  - Summer (DST): UTC+2 (CEST)
- Postal code: 4303
- Area code: 07435

Sankt Pantaleon-Erla is a town in the district of Amstetten in Lower Austria in Austria.

== Geography ==
St. Pantaleon-Erla lies on the west border of Upper Austria in the Mostviertel east of the confluence of the Enns Canal and the Danube. About 27.37 percent of the municipality is forested.
