= Emmersdorf an der Donau =

- Municipality
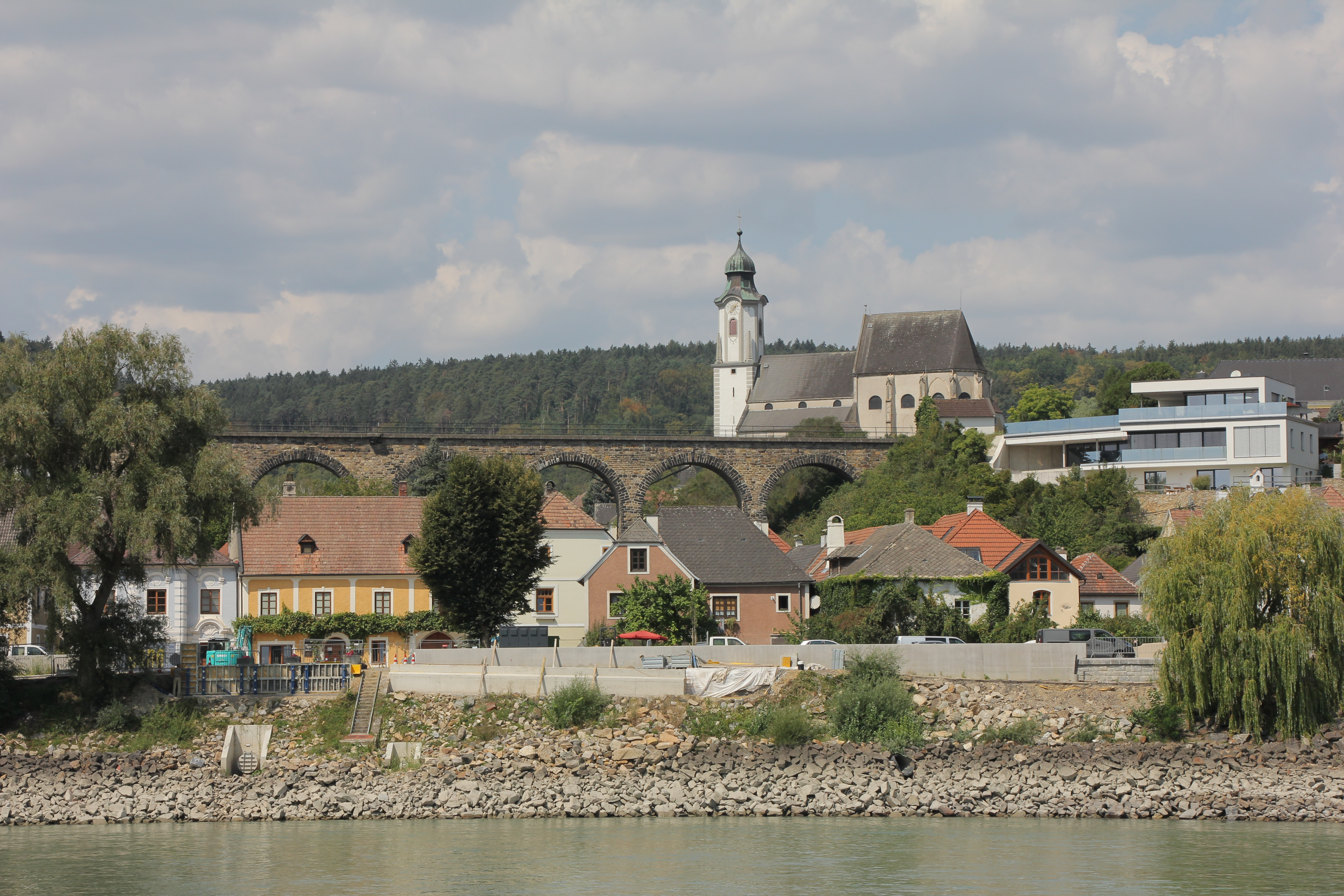
- Emmersdorf as viewed from the Danube

- Flag Coat of arms

- Location within Austria
- Coordinates: 48°14′N 15°20′E
- Country: Austria
- State: Lower Austria
- District: Melk

Government
  - Mayor: Richard Hochratner

Area
  - Total: 29.81 km^{2} (11.51 sq mi)
- Elevation: 240 m (790 ft)

Population (2018-01-01)
  - Total: 1,778
  - Density: 59.64/km^{2} (154.5/sq mi)
- Time zone: UTC+1 (CET)
  - Summer (DST): UTC+2 (CEST)
- Postal code: 3644
- Area code: 02752
- Website: www.emmersdorf.at

Emmersdorf an der Donau is a town in the district of Melk in the Austrian state of Lower Austria.

== Population ==
Historical population
Year	Pop.	±%
1971	1,429	—
1981	1,473	+3.1%
1991	1,631	+10.7%
2001	1,706	+4.6%

== Gallery ==
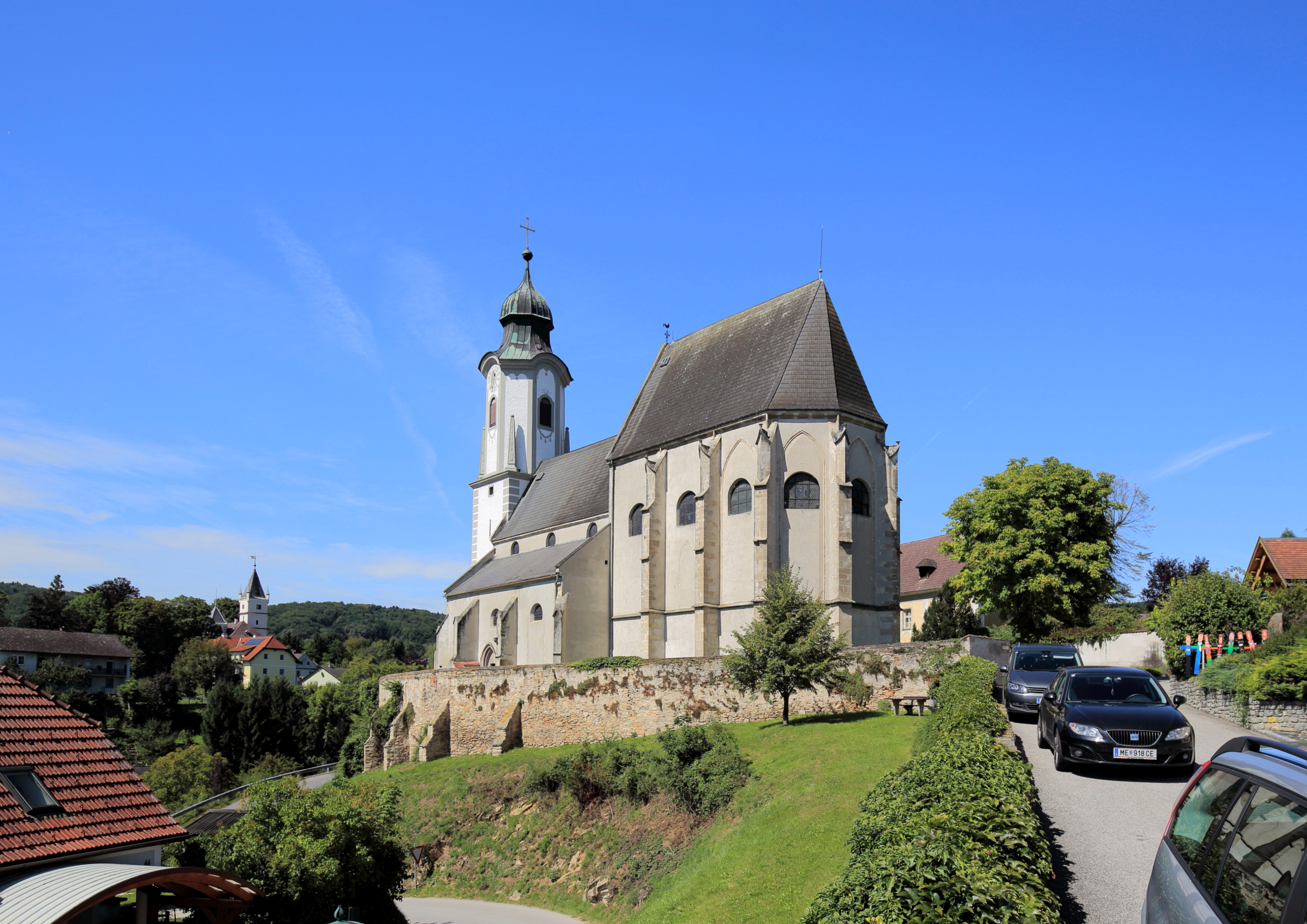
Parish church

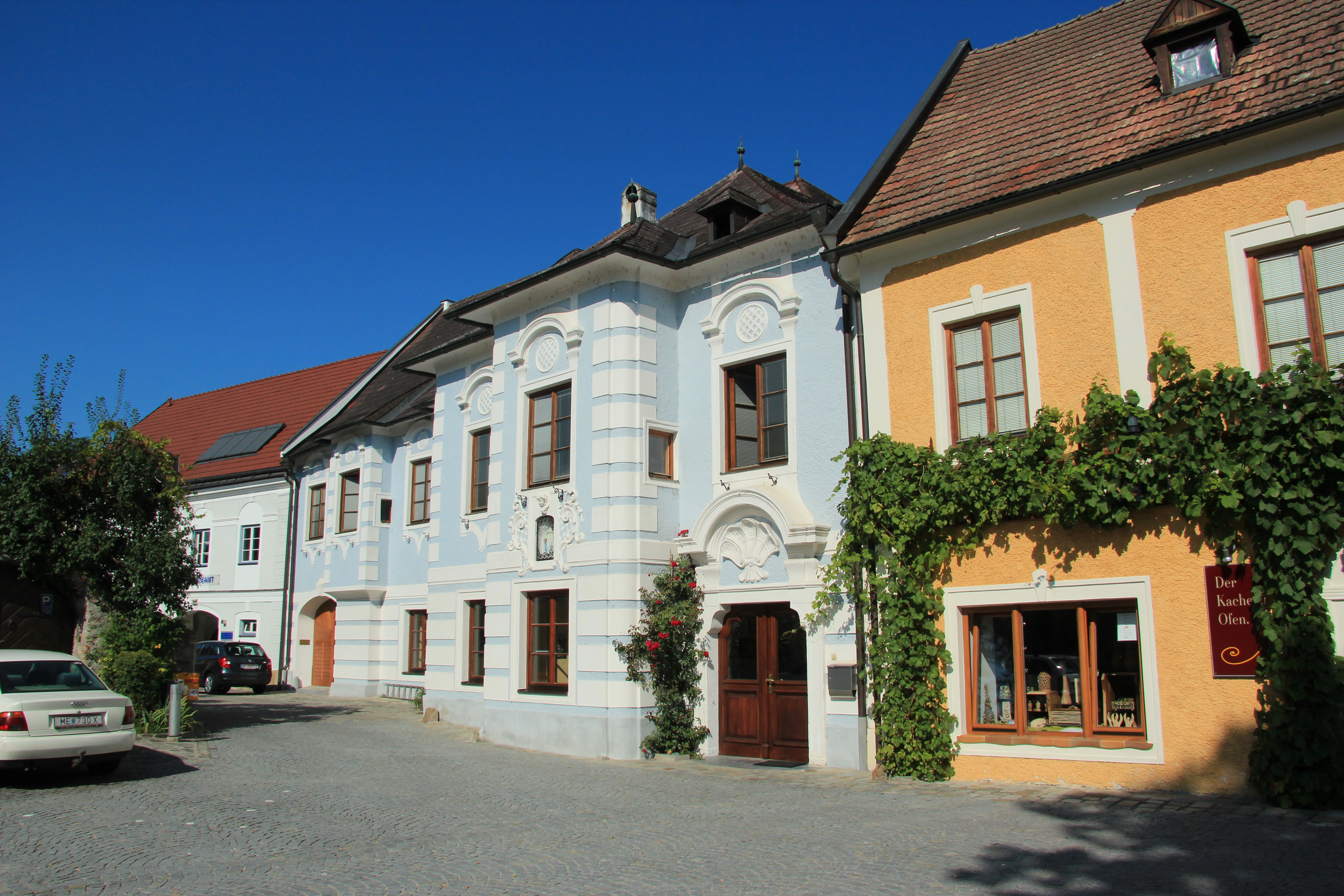
Residential building

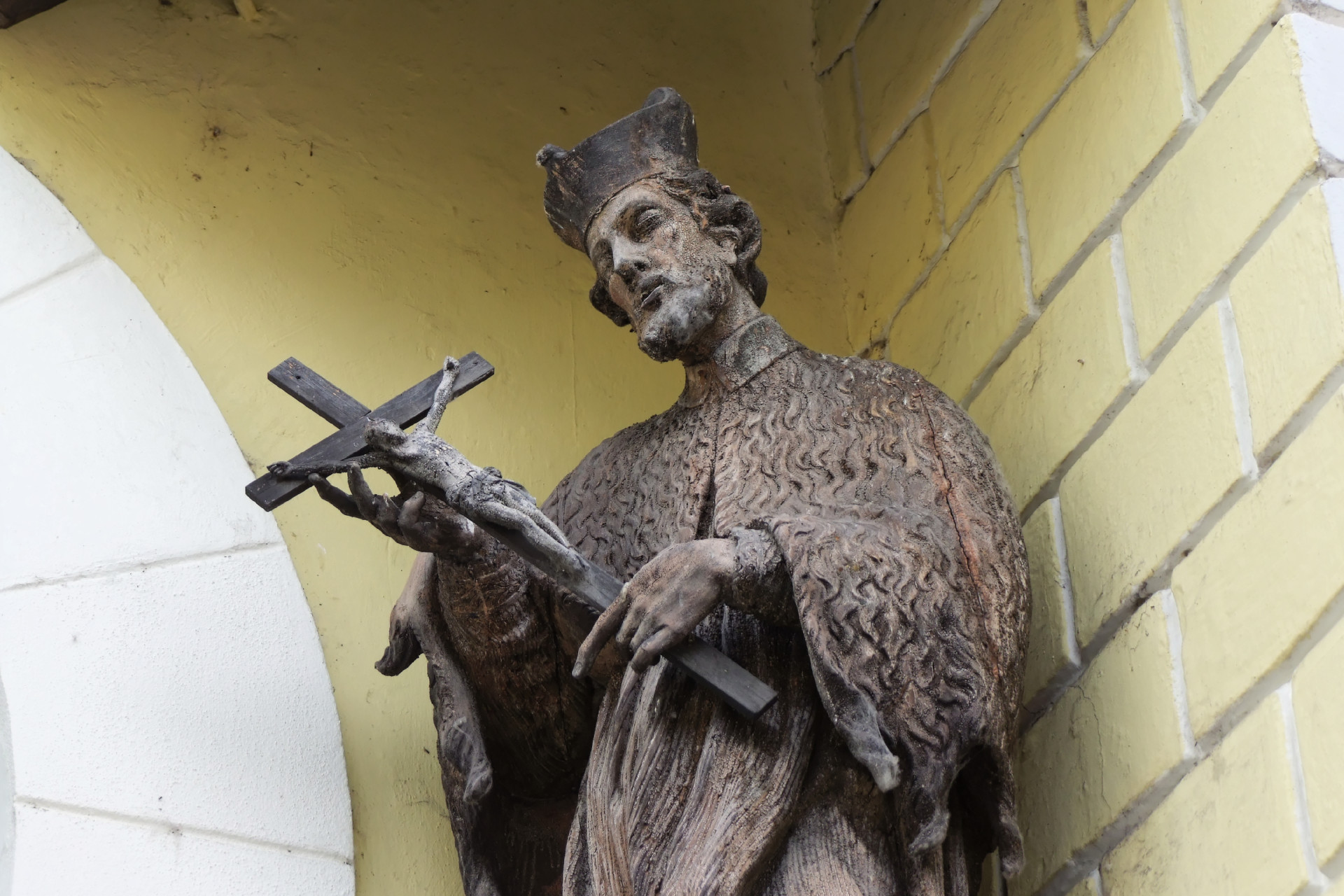
Detail of sculpture outside municipal office
