= Hofamt Priel =

- Municipality
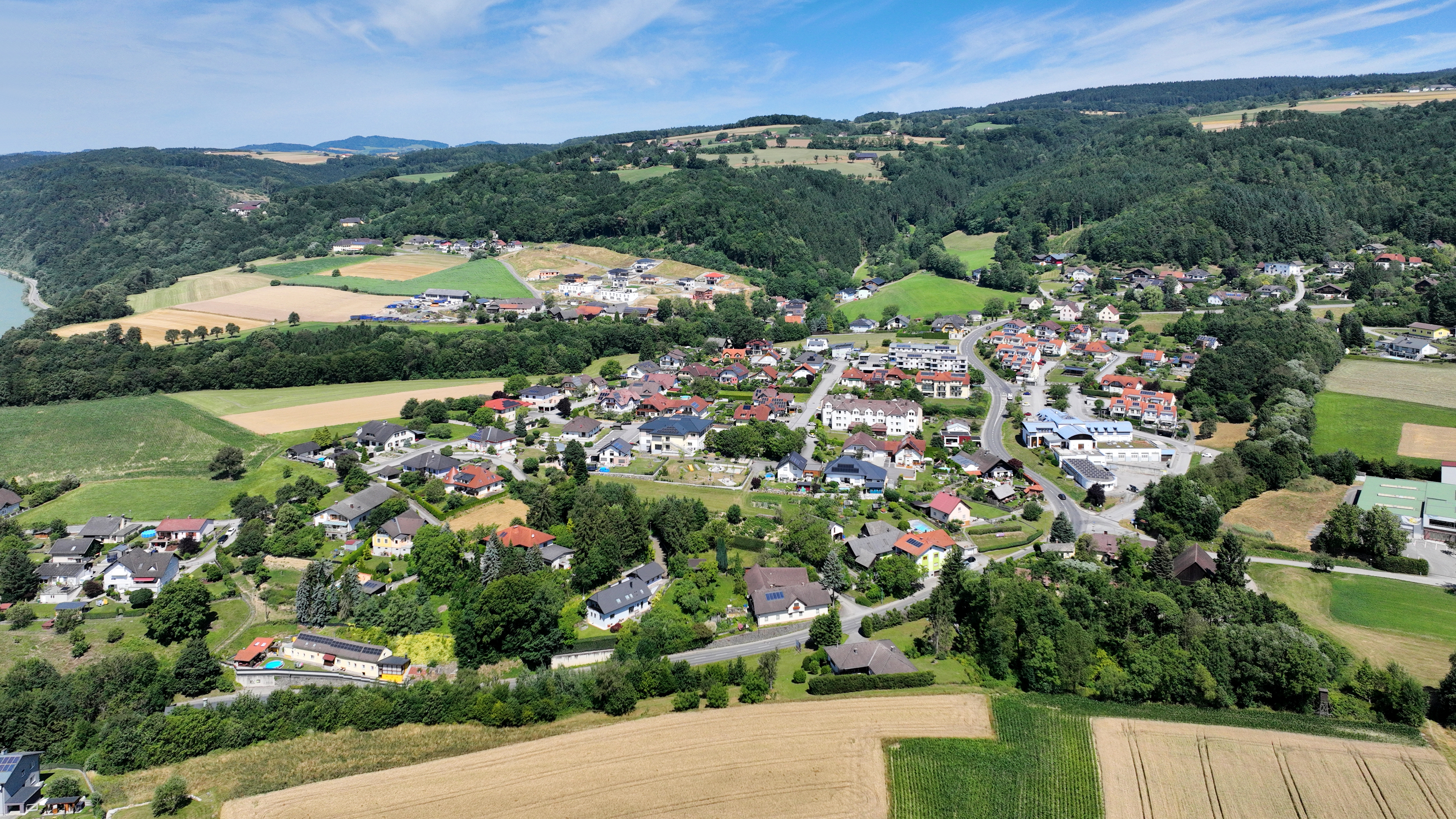
- Aerial view of Hofamt Priel

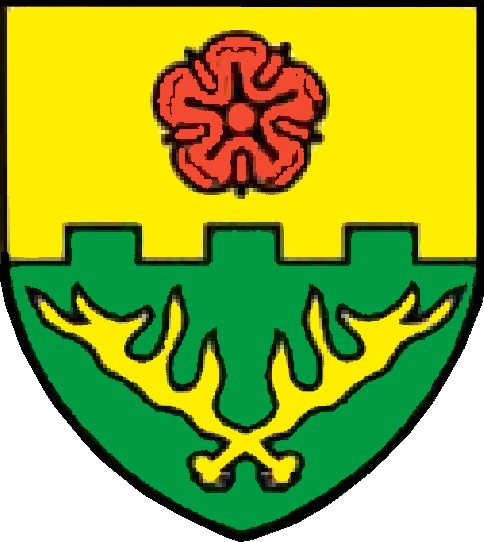
- Coat of arms

- Location within Austria
- Coordinates: 48°11′44″N 15°4′44″E
- Country: Austria
- State: Lower Austria
- District: Melk

Government
  - Mayor: Friedrich Buchberger

Area
  - Total: 39.63 km^{2} (15.30 sq mi)
- Elevation: 240 m (790 ft)

Population (2018-01-01)
  - Total: 1,675
  - Density: 42.27/km^{2} (109.5/sq mi)
- Time zone: UTC+1 (CET)
  - Summer (DST): UTC+2 (CEST)
- Postal code: 3681
- Area code: +43 7412
- Website: www.hofamtpriel.at

Hofamt Priel is a municipality in the district of Melk in the Austrian state of Lower Austria north of the river Danube. On the night of 2 May 1945, the SS marched more than 200 refugees a short way inland and murdered them.

== Population ==
Historical population
Year	Pop.	±%
1971	1,463	—
1981	1,604	+9.6%
1991	1,624	+1.2%
2001	1,648	+1.5%
