= Ferenc Deák Bridge =

Ferenc Deák Bridge Deák Ferenc híd
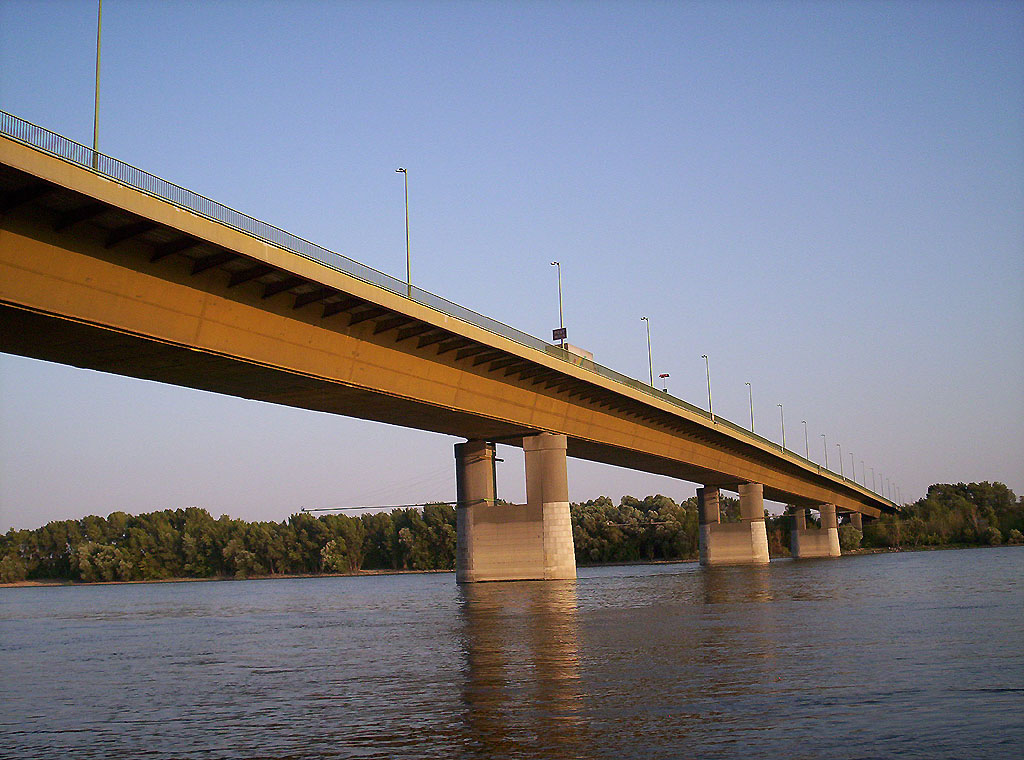
- Coordinates: 47°23′24″N 19°00′50″E
- Crosses: Danube
- Locale: Budapest and Szigetszentmiklós, Hungary

Characteristics
- Design: Steel girder bridge
- Total length: 700 m (2,300 ft)
- No. of lanes: 8

History
- Designer: Uvaterv; Tibor Klatsmány; Tibor Sigrai

Location
- Interactive map of Ferenc Deák Bridge

The Ferenc Deák Bridge (Hungarian: Deák Ferenc híd) (Note: according to the decision of the Geographical Names Committee of 27 October 2003, no. 47/454, unofficially the southern Danube bridge of the M0 motorway, but also called the Hárosi Danube Bridge) is the southernmost Danube bridge in Budapest, part of the E60, E71, and E75 international highways. The completed bridge was opened to traffic on 16 November 1990. It is named after politician Ferenc Deák.

The southern part of the bridge was opened on 30 June 2013.

== History ==
=== Renovation of the former Hárosi Danube Bridge (2018–2020) ===
The northern bridge, built between 1987 and 1990, has had problems during use. The first public record from September 2013 states that, following the opening of the new Ferenc Deák Bridge, the old track is planned to be completely renovated and the superstructure of the three-span riverbed bridge to be replaced.

As part of the renovation of the affected section of the M0, the bridge was also renovated, which was opened to traffic in May 2020, but shortly afterwards it was closed again with half-track diversions, but neither the contractor Strabag Zrt. nor the client Nemzeti Infrastruktúra-fejlesztő Zrt. commented on the reasons for the repeated closure.

== Traffic ==
An important Danube bridge in the southern sector of the M0 ring road, it is the busiest crossing in Hungary. After its completion, it will be used by more than 100 thousand vehicles daily.
