= Lužný most =

Bridge in the Bratislava Region

Floodplain Bridge Lužný Most
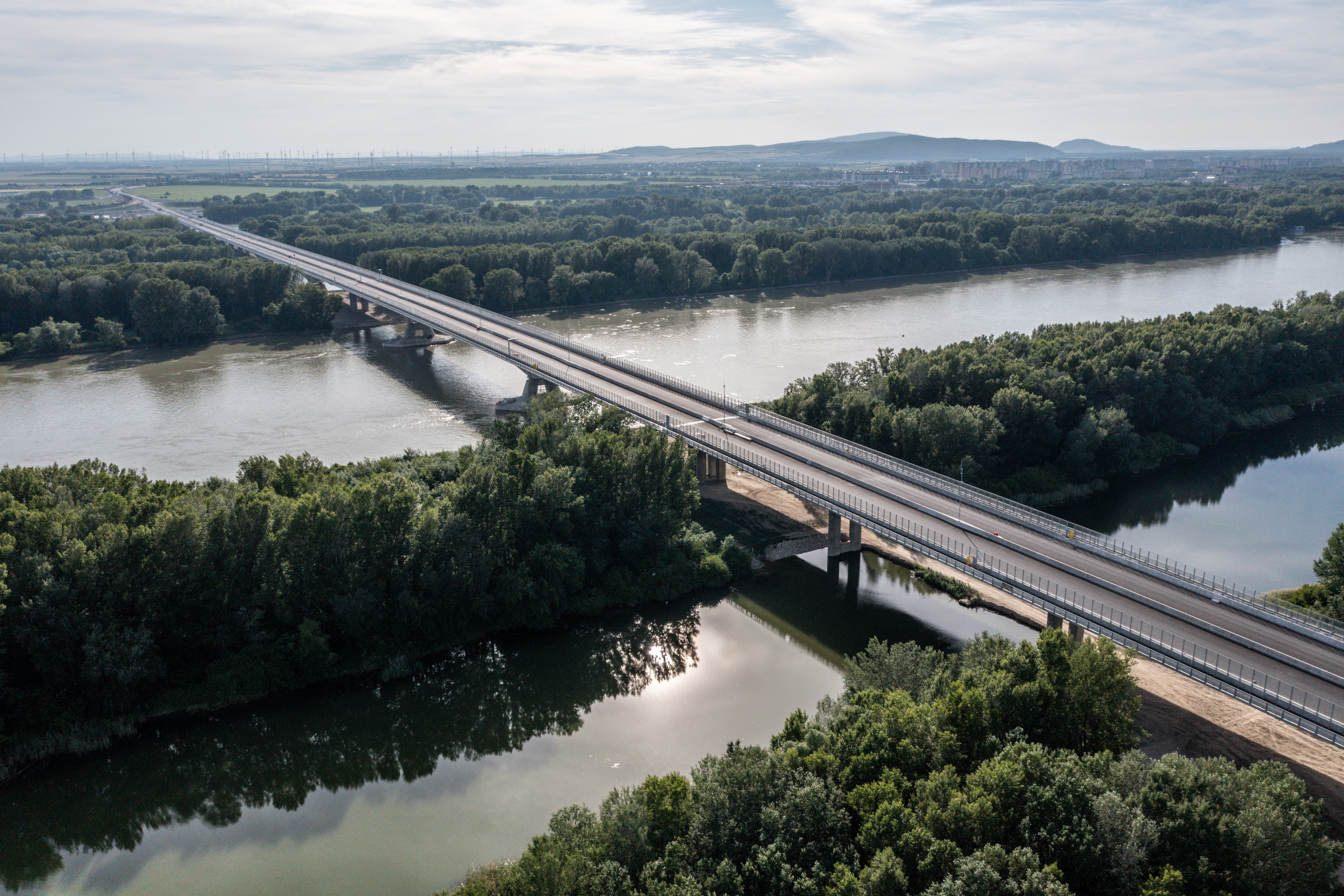
- The Floodplain Bridge from above
- Coordinates: 48.0831°N 17.1521°E
- Carries: Automobile traffic
- Crosses: Danube
- Locale: D4 motorway, Bratislava Region, Slovakia
- Owner: Slovakia
- Maintained by: Zero Bypass Ltd.

Characteristics
- Design: Beam
- Total length: 2,932 m (9,619 ft)
- Width: 35 m (115 ft)
- Height: 20 m (66 ft)
- No. of lanes: 4 (2 shared-use paths)
- Capacity: 35,000 vehicles/day

History
- Designer: Dopravoprojekt, a. s.
- Constructed by: D4R7 Construction
- Built: 2018–2021
- Construction start: 2018
- Opened: September 26, 2021

Statistics
- Toll: None - no vignette required

Location
- Interactive map of Floodplain Bridge

Lužný most (English: Floodplain bridge) is a motorway bridge located on the D4 motorway in the Bratislava Region in Slovakia. It crosses the Danube river at the height of 20 m (66 ft) and with the length of 2,932 m (9,619 ft), it is the longest bridge in the region and second longest in the country after the R2 viaduct on the segment between Kriváň and Mýtna. The bridge was built as a part of a public-private partnership (PPP) project which included the construction of the D4 (Bratislava bypass) and the R7.

The construction of the bridge began in 2018 and was completed and opened on September 26, 2021. It features a 2-lane dual carriageway with each lane being 3.75 m (12.3 ft) wide and 2 shared-use paths separated from the main motorway by noise barriers. Its main purpose is to reduce traffic on the overloaded Harbour bridge in Bratislava.

== Name ==
The name was decided in a public poll organized by the Ministry of Transport on the social media platform Facebook. In the finals, the name Lužný most received 69% of the total votes, beating out Jarovský most that received 31%. Among the popular names was also Španielsky most that was supposed to advance to the finals, as it gathered more votes than Lužný most in the semifinals. However, it was subsequently removed from the poll due to most votes coming from suspicious and "untrustworthy" accounts.

== Tolls ==
After the opening, the bridge entered the toll network which required drivers to purchase a Slovak motorway vignette in order to use the bridge. On August 1, 2024, a law came info effect that removed the vignette requirement on specified motorway sections. This included the bridge along with the majority of the D4 motorway.
