= Northern Railway Bridge =

Northern Railway Bridge Nordbahnbrücke
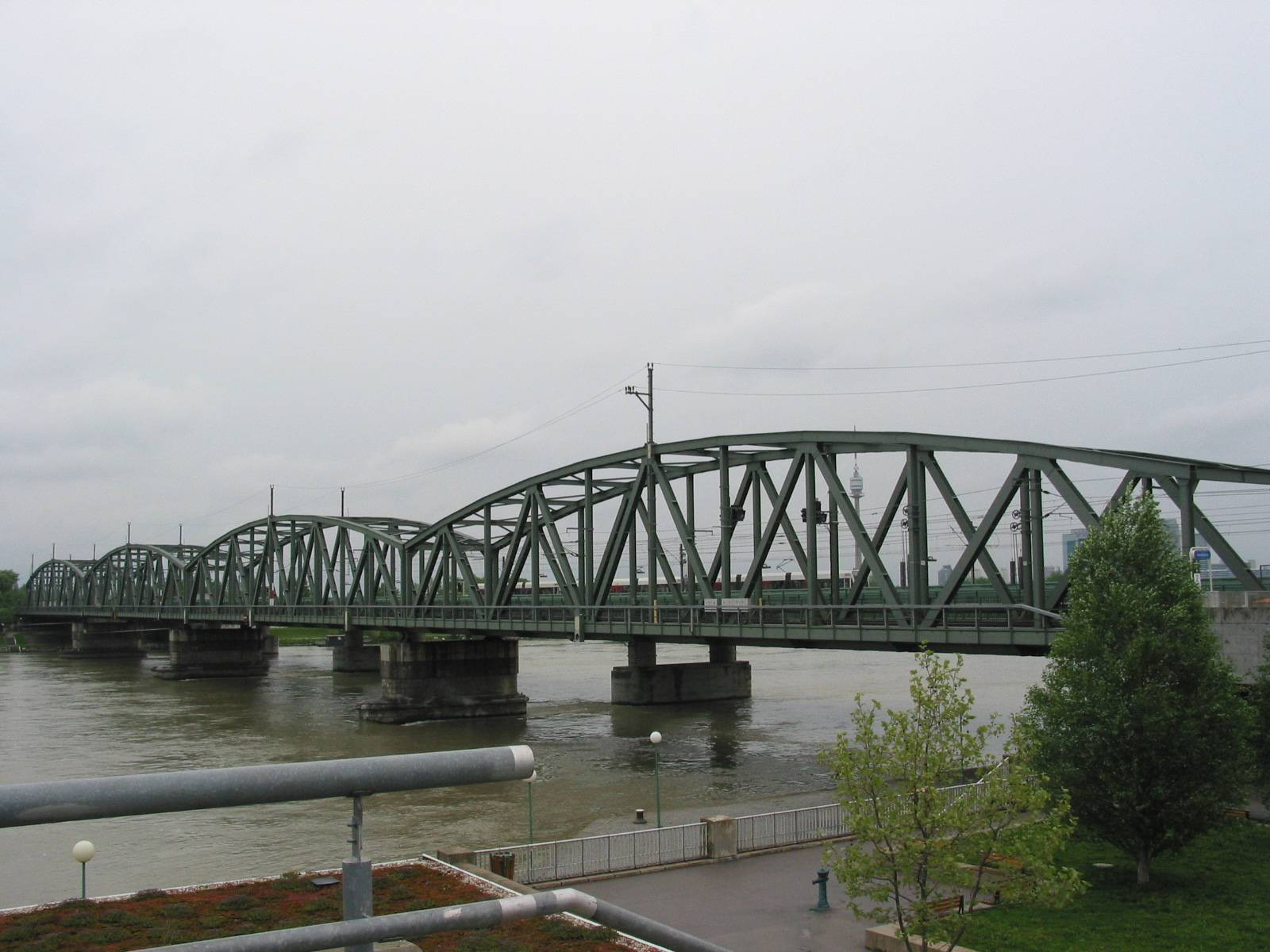
- The Northern Railway Bridge.
- Coordinates: 48°14′36″N 16°23′18″E
- Carries: Northern Railway, Northwestern Railway
- Crosses: Danube
- Locale: Vienna
- Owner: ÖBB

Characteristics
- No. of spans: 4 spans

History
- Opened: 1870 (Original bridge); 1957 (Rebuilt)
- Closed: 1945-57

The Northern Railway Bridge (German: Nordbahnbrücke) is a Truss bridge over the Danube in Vienna, Austria. It is one of two railway crossings within the city, the other being the Stadtlauer Eastern Railway Bridge. The bridge is a double track Parker truss bridge with 4 spans connecting the municipalities of Brigittenau and Floridsdorf.
