= Main road 5 (Hungary) =

Road in Hungary

Main road 5
- 5-ös főút
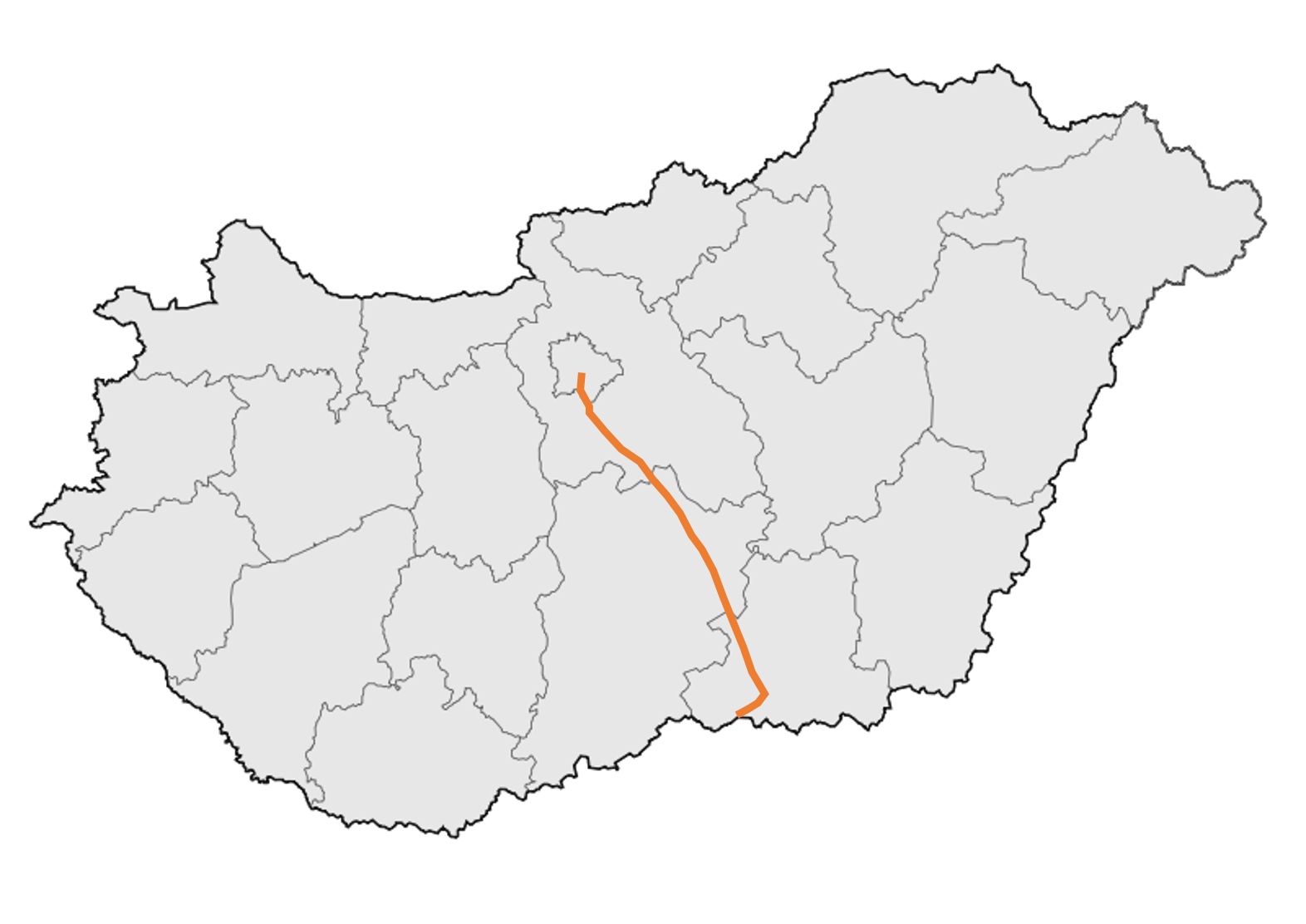

Route information
- Length: 185 km (115 mi)

Major junctions
- From: Budapest
- 510 in Budapest XXIII.; M51 near Budapest, XXIII.; M0 near Budapest, XXIII.; M5 near Lajosmizse; 445 near Kecskemét; 441 in Kecskemét; 52 in Kecskemét; 541 in Kecskemét; 54 / 44 near Kecskemét; 542 near Kiskunfélegyháza; 451 in Kiskunfélegyháza; 502 near Szeged; 43 in Szeged; 55 in Szeged
- To: 100 at Röszke

Location
- Country: Hungary
- Counties: Pest, Bács-Kiskun, Csongrád-Csanád
- Major cities: Budapest, Ócsa, Dabas, Örkény, Lajosmizse, Kecskemét, Kiskunfélegyháza, Kistelek, Szeged

Highway system
- Roads in Hungary; Highways; Main roads; Local roads

The Main road 5 (Hungarian: 5-ös főút) is a north–south First class main road in Hungary, that connects Budapest with Röszke (the border of Serbia). The road is 185 kilometres (115 mi) long. Most of the traffic was taken over by the M5 motorway.

The road, as well as all other main roads in Hungary, is managed and maintained by Magyar Közút, state owned company.

Today's Route 5 is one of the oldest main transport routes in the Hungarian Great Plain, connecting Pest with Szeged, one of the most important crossing points of the Tisza, largely through the flood-free sandy plain of the Kiskunság. Documents from the 13th century refer to the Ócsa-Örkény-Kecskemét-Szeged route as the Via Magna (great road, main road). In later sources it is mainly referred to as the Szeged road. Its route has been shifted several times in historical times, and these shifts are clearly visible on historical maps.

In the 1930s, the road was upgraded to a modern highway, and its route was changed to the Alsónémedi-Sári-Örkény route. The section of the road between Budapest and Kecskemét was opened in 1934 as part of the Budapest-Belgrade international highway. In the following decade, the arrow-straight section near Gyón was the venue for the prestigious international drag races of the era. On the more than 5 km long straight, horizontal concrete section of the track, German racing driver Hans Stuck set a world record in 1934 with a speed of 321 km/h. A reminder of the world speed record era is the restaurant between milestones 45 and 46, built in the 1930s to cater for guests arriving for races. It was here that British motorcycle racer Eric Fernihough was killed in 1938 in a record-breaking attempt.

The first numbering of the road took place between the two world wars. As the Budapest-Szeged main road was part of the London-Istanbul transcontinental route, it seemed reasonable to designate the whole Hungarian section of the route with a single number. Therefore, in its first draft published in 1935, the Ministry of Transport designated the road as number 1, as a continuation of the Budapest-Vienna road. In the final numbering system introduced in January 1936, the road was first listed as Highway 5. (According to other data, the Minister of Trade and Transport had already declared it a primary trunk road in 1934, numbering it 5.) The number plates 5 were installed on the road between 1936 and 1937. In 1936, the Olympic torch on its way to the Olympic Games in Berlin passed along this road.

== See also ==
- Roads in Hungary
