= M43 motorway (Hungary) =

Road in Hungary

M43 motorway
- M43-as autópálya
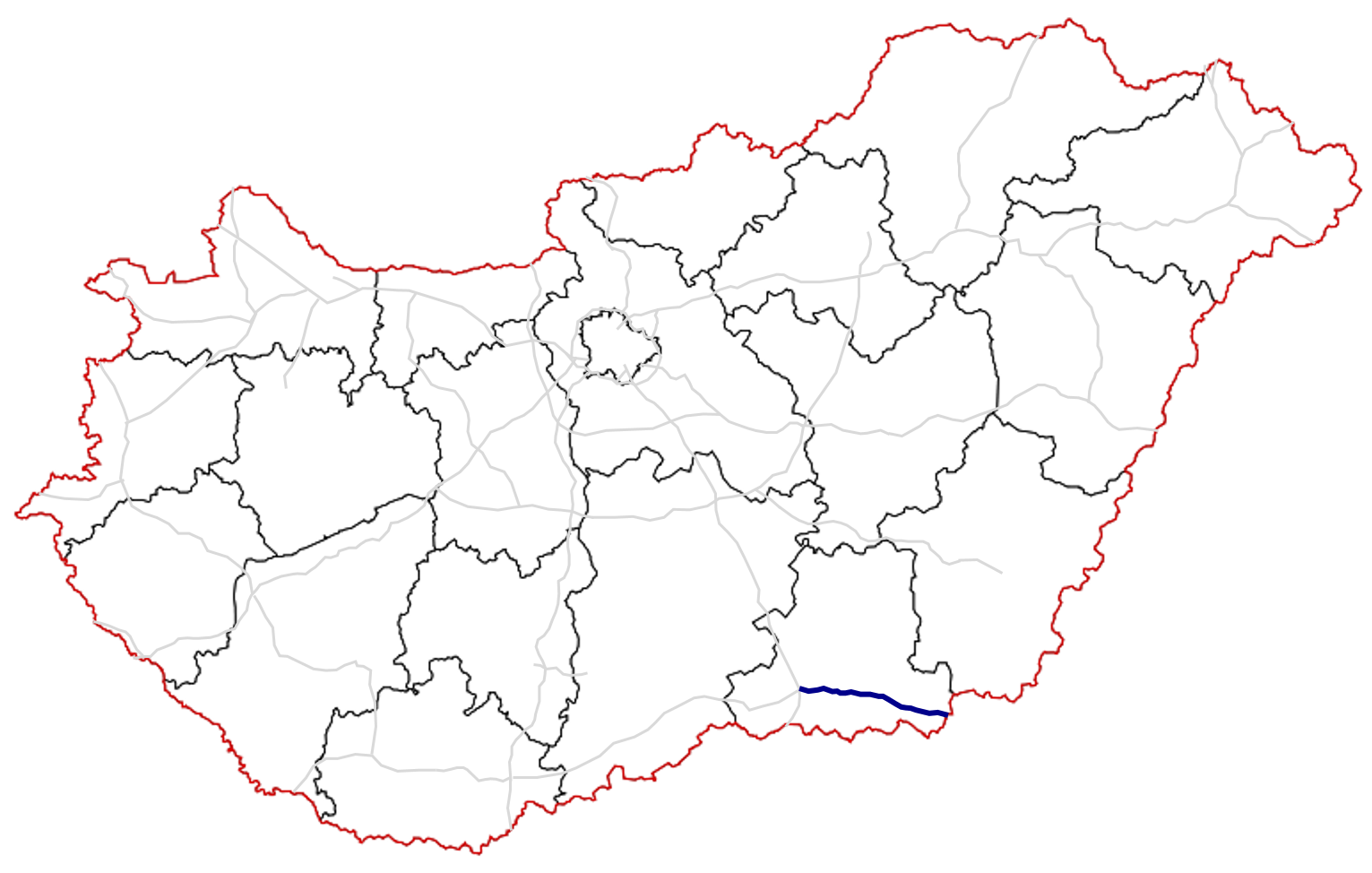
- in use other highways

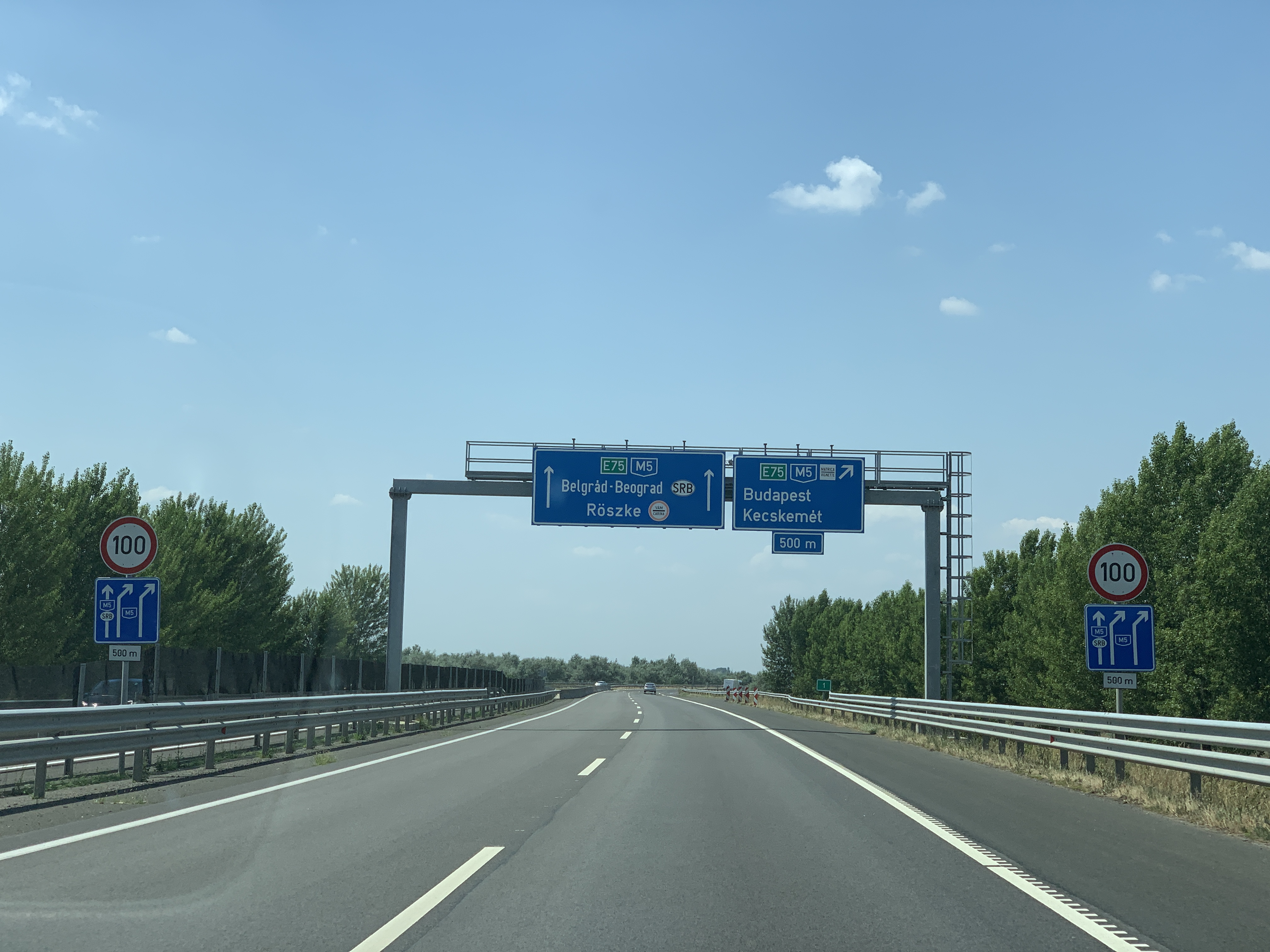
- M43 near Kiskundorozsma

Route information
- Part of E68
- Length: 57.7 km (35.9 mi)

Major junctions
- West end: M5 near Szeged
- 5 / 47 near Szeged; 430 near Makó
- East end: border with Romania → A 1

Location
- Country: Hungary
- Counties: Csongrád
- Major cities: Szeged, Makó

Highway system
- Roads in Hungary; Highways; Main roads; Local roads

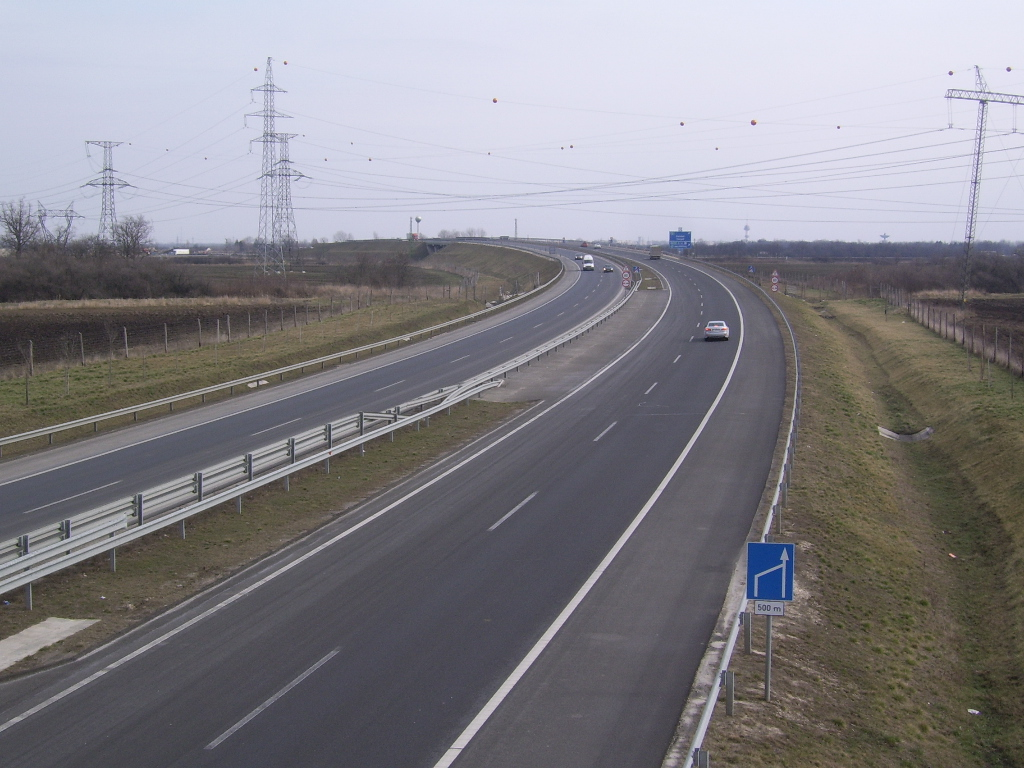
M43 motorway near Szeged

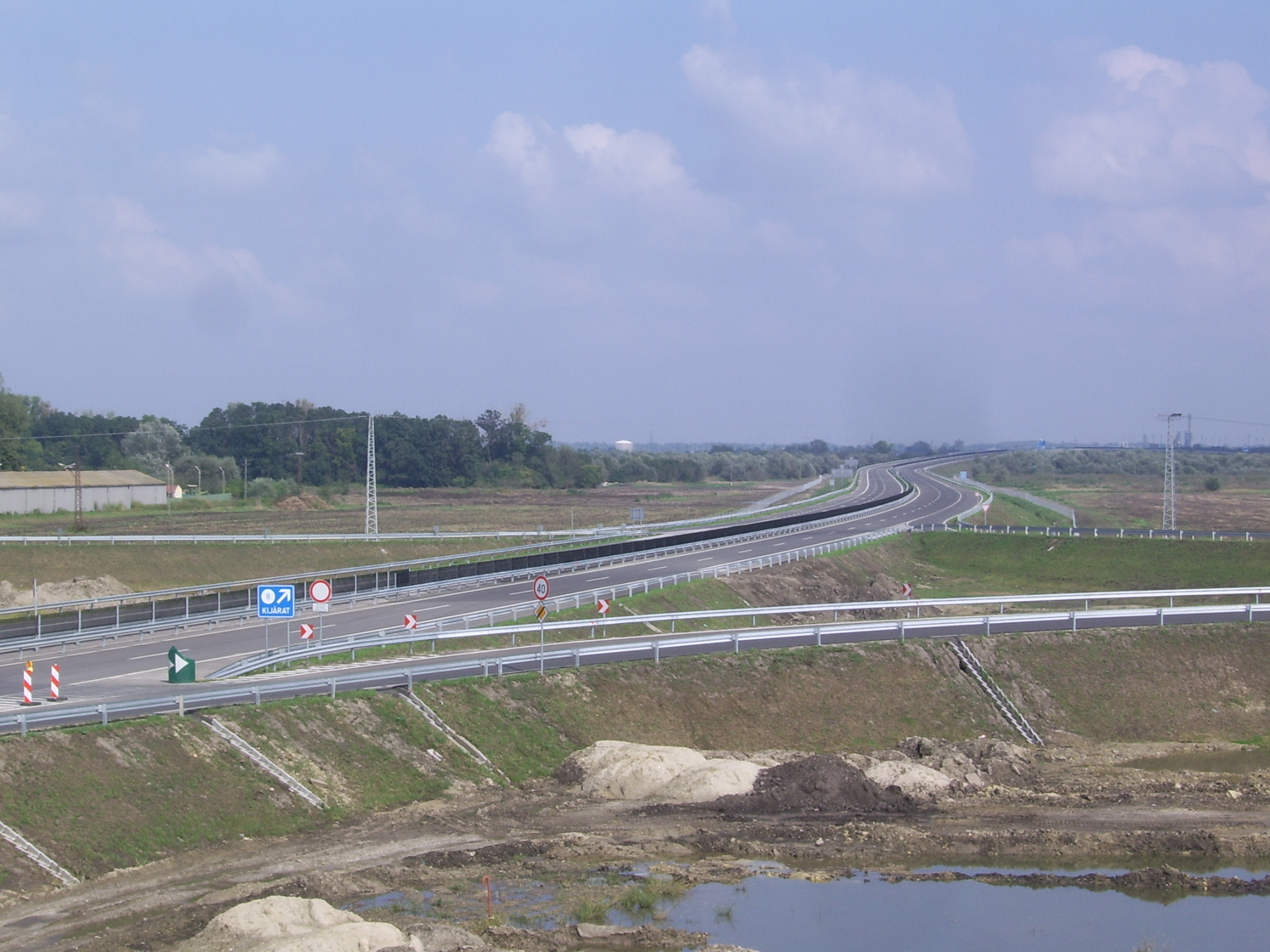
M43 motorway near Sándorfalva

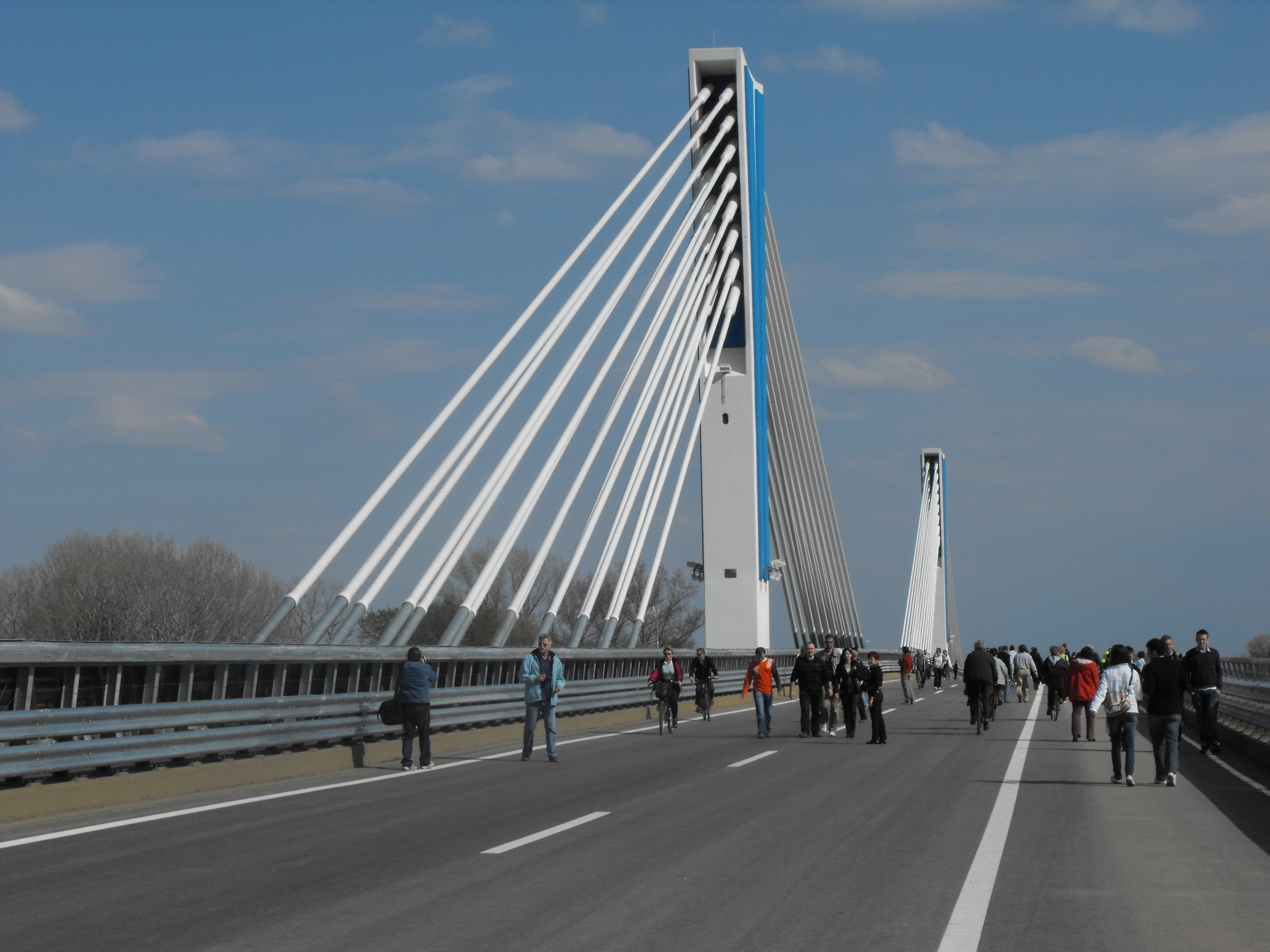
Móra Ferenc bridge over Tisza river

The M43 motorway (Hungarian: M43-as autópálya) is a Hungarian motorway that runs from the junction with the M5 Motorway west of Szeged to the Romanian border at Nagylak via Makó. Since 2015 it connects Hungary with Romania as the first border crossing on a motorway between the two countries.

== Timeline ==
Section	Length	Opened	Notes
Szeged (M5) – Szeged-Rókus	3.0 km (1.86 mi)	10 December 2005	Segment 1, built between 2003 – 2005.
Szeged-Rókus – Szeged észak (Sándorfalva)	4.4 km (2.73 mi)	1 April 2010	Segment 2/A, built between 2008 – 2010.
Szeged észak (Sándorfalva) – Szeged-Felsőváros (Hódmezővásárhely)	3.3 km (2.05 mi)	7 October 2010	Segment 2/B, built between 2008 – 2010.
Szeged-Felsőváros (Hódmezővásárhely) – Makó	23.9 km (14.85 mi)	9 April 2011	Segment 2/C, built between 2008 – 2011, with the Tisza Bridge.
Makó – Csanádpalota (border)	23.1 km (14.35 mi)	11 July 2015	Segment 3, built between 2013 – 2015.

== Route description ==
- The route is full length motorway. The maximum speed limit is 130 km/h, with (2x2 lane road with stop lane).

County	km	Type	Destination	Notes
Csongrád-Csanád	0	Interchange	M5 / E75 – Budapest, Kecskemét M5 / E75 – Röszke → Belgrade (SRB)	The western terminus of the motorway, and E68 route. Kilometrage starting point trumpet interchange
Csongrád-Csanád	4	Exit	Main road 5 – Szeged-Rókus / Kistelek	
Csongrád-Csanád	5	Rest area	Szegedi pihenőhely	parking, and wc pihenőhely means Rest area
Csongrád-Csanád	8	Exit	Szeged észak / Sándorfalva	észak means North
Csongrád-Csanád	11	Exit	Main road 47 – Szeged-Felsőváros / Hódmezővásárhely	
Csongrád-Csanád	16	Bridge	Móra Ferenc híd (over Tisza)	Length: 661 m híd means Bridge
Csongrád-Csanád	19	Exit	Rákóczi telep	
Csongrád-Csanád	24	Exit	Maroslele	
Csongrád-Csanád	31	Rest area	Kéthalmi pihenőhely	parking, wc, and weigh in motion (traffic control)
Csongrád-Csanád	35	Exit	Main road 430 – Makó / Hódmezővásárhely, Földeák	
Csongrád-Csanád	47	Exit	Apátfalva / Királyhegyes, Kövegy	
Csongrád-Csanád	49	Rest area	Kövegyi Szent Gellért pihenőhely	parking, petrol station (MOL), café, restaurant, and shower facilities
Csongrád-Csanád	55	Exit	Main road 448 – Nagylak / Tótkomlós, Csanádpalota	
Csongrád-Csanád	57	Rest area	Krak-éri pihenőhely	parking, and wc
Csongrád-Csanád	59	Border control	Csanádpalota (H) – Nădlac II. (RO) border crossing A 1 / E68 – Arad, Timișoara towards to Bucharest	Csanádpalota border crossing to Romania → A1 motorway. The eastern terminus of the motorway, and E68 concurrency.
1.000 mi = 1.609 km; 1.000 km = 0.621 mi: Concurrency terminus; Incomplete access; Unopened

== Maintenance ==
The operation and maintenance of the road by Hungarian Public Road Nonprofit Pte Ltd Co. This activity is provided by this highway engineer.

- near Makó, kilometre trench 35

== Payment ==
From February 1, 2016, the M43 motorway is fully charged. Hungarian system has 2 main type in terms of salary:

1, time-based fee vignettes (E-matrica);

- Cars, vans and motorbikes up to 3.5 tonnes only need to buy a single vignette which costs 6,400 Hungarian forint (Ft) for 10 days, 10,360 Ft for 1 month and 57,260 Ft for a year, from 1 January 2024.

2, county vignettes (vármegyei matrica); the highway can be used instead of the national sticker with the following county stickers:

Type of county vignette	Available section
Csongrád-Csanád	full length (0 km – 59 km)

== European Route(s) ==
Name	Route
	59 km	junction (0) – (Romania) Autostrada A1

== Significant artifacts ==
Bridge

- Ferenc Móra Bridge (Móra Ferenc híd; 661 m or 2,169 ft) over Tisza river

== See also ==
- Roads in Hungary
- Transport in Hungary
- International E-road network
