= Main road 442 (Hungary) =

Road in Hungary

Main road 442
- 442-es főút

Route information
- Length: 43 km (27 mi)

Major junctions
- From: 4 in Szolnok
- M44 near Kunszentmáron
- To: 44 in Kunszentmárton

Location
- Country: Hungary
- Counties: Jász-Nagykun-Szolnok
- Major cities: Szolnok, Rákóczifalva, Martfű, Tiszaföldvár, Kunszentmárton

Highway system
- Roads in Hungary; Highways; Main roads; Local roads

The Main road 46 is a north-south direction Secondary class main road in the Nagykunság (Alföld) region of Hungary, that connects the Main road 4 change to the Main road 44, facilitating access from Szolnok to Kunszentmárton. The road is 43 km long.

The road, as well as all other main roads in Hungary, is managed and maintained by Magyar Közút, state owned company.

== See also ==
- Roads in Hungary
- Transport in Hungary
