= Main road 44 (Hungary) =

Road in Hungary

Main road 44
- 44-es főút
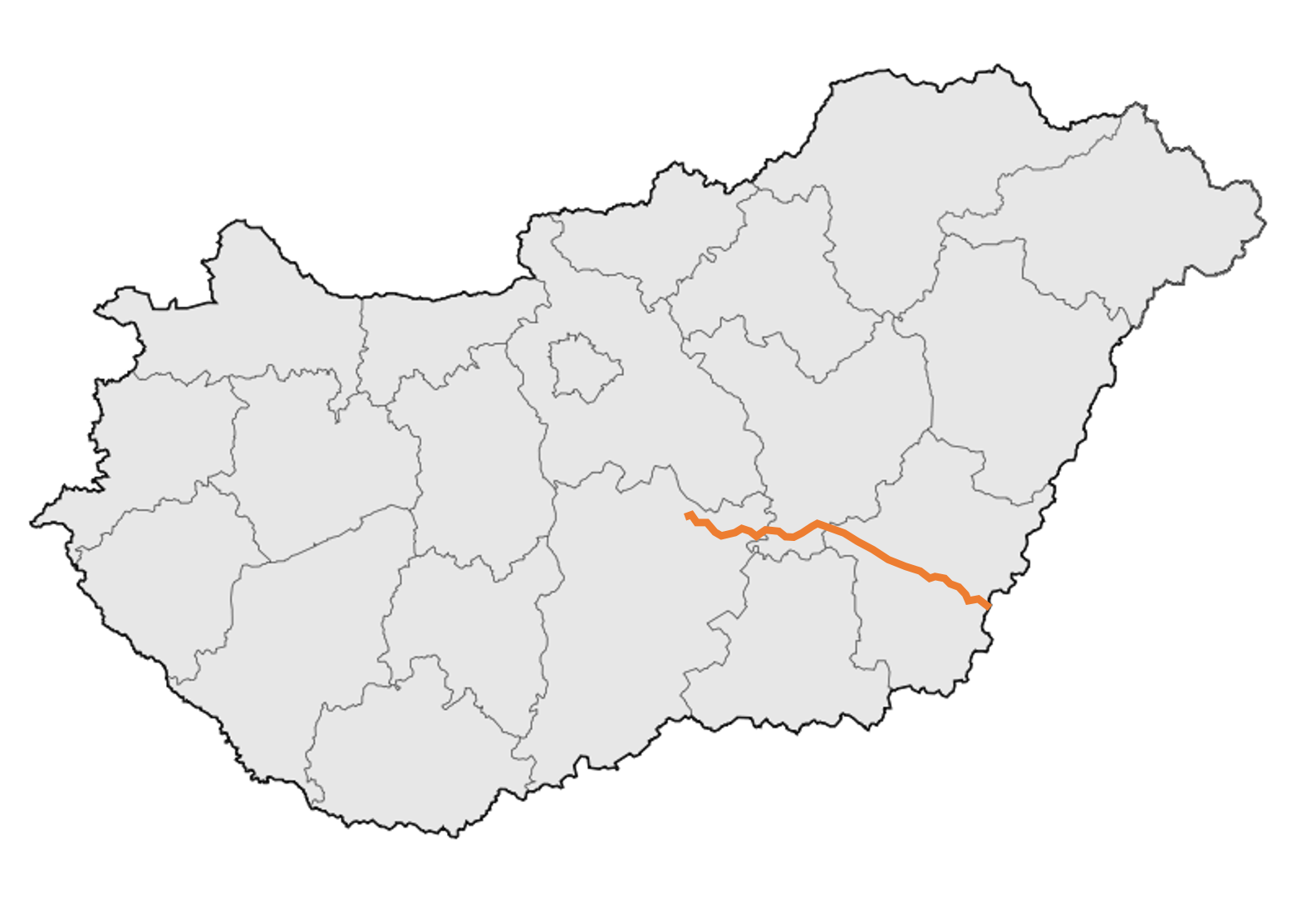

Route information
- Length: 144 km (89 mi)

Major junctions
- From: 5 / 54 near Kecskemét
- 445 in Kecskemét; M44 in Tiszakürt; 442 near Kunszentmárton; 45 in Kunszentmárton; 443 near Szarvas; M44 near Kardos; 47 near Békéscsaba; M44 near Békéscsaba; 470 near Békéscsaba
- To: Gyula; DN79A border with Romania

Location
- Country: Hungary
- Counties: Bács-Kiskun, Jász-Nagykun-Szolnok, Békés
- Major cities: Kecskemét, Kunszentmárton, Szarvas, Békéscsaba, Gyula

Highway system
- Roads in Hungary; Highways; Main roads; Local roads

The Main road 44 (Hungarian: 44-es főút) is a west–east direction First class main road in Hungary, that connects Kecskemét (the Main road 5 and the Main road 54 junction) with Gyula (the border of Romania). The road is 144 kilometres (89 mi) long. Most of the traffic was taken over by the M44 expressway.

The road, as well as all other main roads in Hungary, is managed and maintained by Magyar Közút, state owned company.

== See also ==
- Roads in Hungary
