= Main road 43 (Hungary) =

Road in Hungary

Main road 43
- 43-as főút
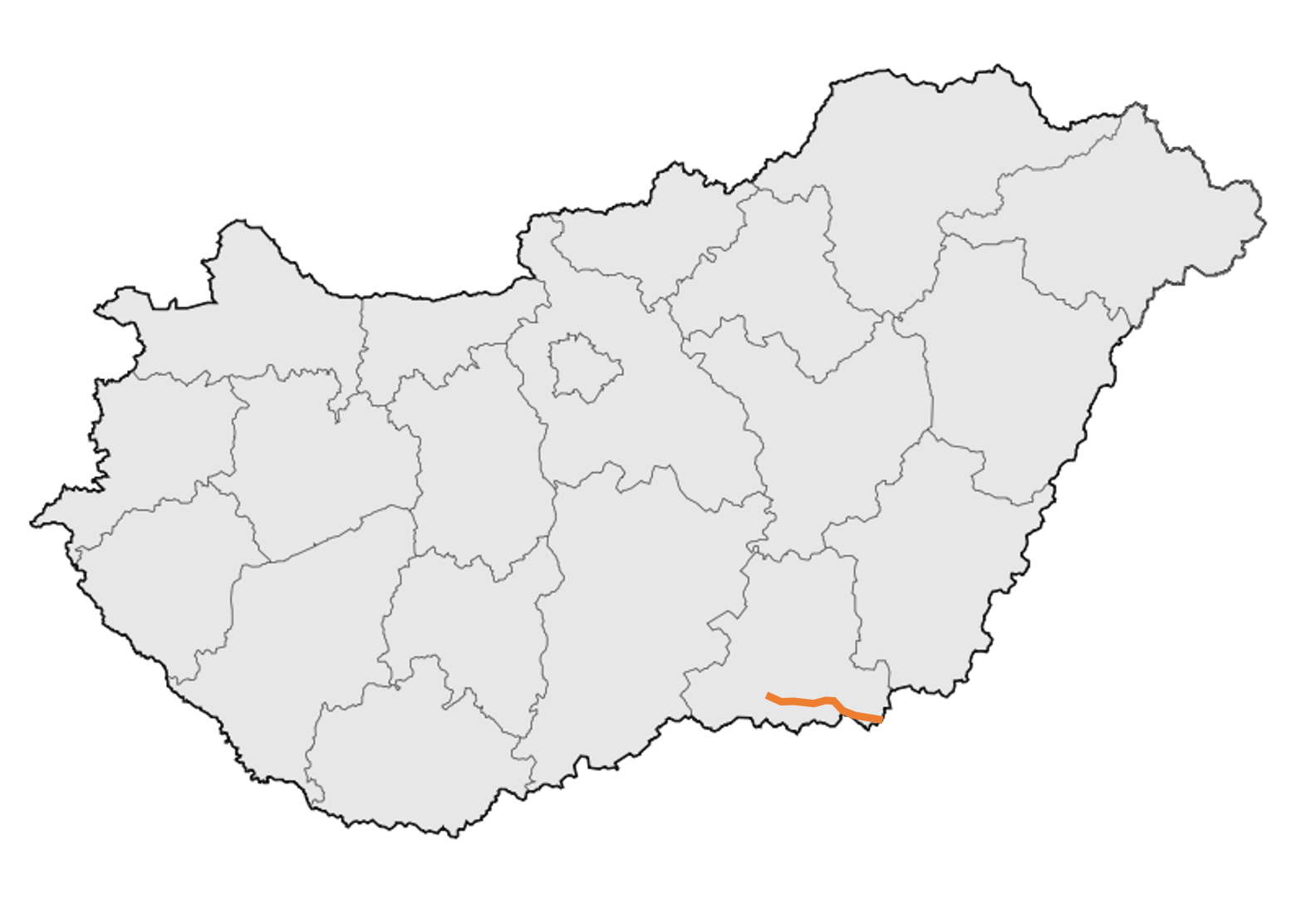

Route information
- Length: 55 km (34 mi)

Major junctions
- From: 5 in Szeged
- 47 in Szeged; 431 near Makó; 430 in Makó; 448 in Nagylak
- To: DN7 at Nagylak

Location
- Country: Hungary
- Counties: Csongrád
- Major cities: Szeged, Makó

Highway system
- Roads in Hungary; Highways; Main roads; Local roads

The Main road 43 (Hungarian: 43-as főút) is an east–west First class main road in Hungary, that connects Szeged (the Main road 5 change) with Nagylak (the border of Romania). The road is 55 kilometres (34 mi) long. Most of the traffic was taken over by the M43 motorway.

The road, as well as all other main roads in Hungary, is managed and maintained by Magyar Közút, state owned company.

== See also ==
- Roads in Hungary
