= List of highways numbered 502 =

The following highways are numbered 502:

== Canada ==
- Ontario Highway 502

== Costa Rica ==
- National Route 502

== Hungary ==
- Main road 502 (Hungary)

== India ==
- National Highway 502 (India)

== Japan ==
- Japan National Route 502

== United States ==
- Florida State Road 502 (former)
  - County Road 502 (Brevard County, Florida)
- Louisiana Highway 502
- Maryland Route 502
- County Route 502 (New Jersey)
- New Mexico State Road 502
- Ohio State Route 502
- Pennsylvania Route 502
- Washington State Route 502

Territories

- Puerto Rico Highway 502

Preceded by 501	Lists of highways 502	Succeeded by 503
