= Main road 45 (Hungary) =

Road in Hungary

Main road 45
- 45-ös főút

Route information
- Length: 53 km (33 mi)

Major junctions
- From: 44 in Kunszentmárton
- 451 near Szentes
- To: 47 near Hódmezővásárhely

Location
- Country: Hungary
- Counties: Jász-Nagykun-Szolnok, Csongrád-Csanád
- Major cities: Kunszentmárton, Szentes, Hódmezővásárhely

Highway system
- Roads in Hungary; Highways; Main roads; Local roads

The Main road 45 is a north-south direction Secondary class main road in the Tiszántúl (Alföld) region of Hungary, that connects the Main road 44 change to the Main road 47, facilitating access from Kunszentmárton to Hódmezővásárhely. The road is 53 km long.

The road, as well as all other main roads in Hungary, is managed and maintained by Magyar Közút, state owned company.

== See also ==
- Roads in Hungary
- Transport in Hungary
