= Al-Masdar News =

Multilingual news website

- Website type: News and opinion
- Available in: English, Arabic, Turkish, Spanish, Russian, German, Serbo-Croatian
- Area served: the Arab world
- Editor: Leith Abou Fadel
- Website: www.almasdarnews.com
- Advertising: Yes
- Commercial: Yes
- Registration: Optional
- Launched: August 2014; 12 years ago
- Current status: inactive

Al-Masdar News (sometimes abbreviated AMN) (Arabic: المصدر نيوز) was an online newspaper founded by Leith Abou Fadel. Al-Masdar is Arabic for "the source." Al-Masdar's coverage focuses largely on conflict zones in the Middle East: Syria, Yemen, and Iraq. Al-Masdar has been described as being favorable to President Bashar al-Assad during its coverage of the Syrian civil war. As of 2023, it appears to be inactive.

== Background ==
Leith Abou Fadel launched Al-Masdar News (AMN) in August 2014 as a media service that provides frontline news and analysis from the Middle East. Before launching AMN, he was the editor of the website Electronic Resistance, which is currently inactive.

== Position ==
The website was described by the BBC and Newsweek as having a pro-Syrian government viewpoint, while The Independent describes it as "sympathetic to the Syrian regime." The New York Times has described it as a "pro-government website." Leonid Bertshidsky writing in Bloomberg News, also calls Al-Masdar "somewhat pro-Assad." The National Interest describes it as "pro-Assad." The Jerusalem Post describes it as "generally supportive of the Syrian regime." The New Statesman calls it a "regime-supporting outlet." The Deputy Editor Chris Tomson has described himself on social media as a "hardcore Assadist on the inside."

== Notable reports, fake news and disinformation ==
In 2015, The New York Times accused Fadel of spreading unfounded misinformation about a victim of the Petra László incident: after a right-wing Hungarian journalist assaulted a Syrian refugee, Fadel falsely reported that the refugee was “a former member of Jabhat Al-Nusra (Al-Qaeda)” adding “looks like Europe will be receiving more Islamist scumbags.” Although Fadel withdrew his allegation, it was picked up by a right-wing commentator Ezra Levant, among others.

Following the April 2017 Khan Shaykhun chemical attack in the Idlib Governorate, al-Masdar News published an opinion article by deputy editor Paul Antonopoulos entitled "Jumping to conclusions; something is not adding up in Idlib chemical weapons attack."

A report by the Atlantic Council's Digital Forensic Research Lab (DFRLab) published three days later described a "digital forensics" trail which showed how this Al-Masdar opinion article was used as a source by conspiracy, pro-Russian and far-right websites, in particular InfoWars, which recycled Antonopoulos' article in a piece by Mimi al Laham. It described Al-Masdar News as "an unofficial government outlet" and said that it had "repeatedly attacked regime critics and witnesses to regime atrocities, notably the White Helmets." Business Insider showed the conclusions in the AMN article differing markedly from those of other analysts, specifically Fred Hof (director of the Atlantic Council's Rafik Hariri Center for the Middle East), US defense officials, President Donald Trump and Dr. Monzer Khalil (rebel-held Idlib Province's health director). Business Insider reporter Natasha Bertrand described Leith Abou Fadel, the editor of Al-Masdar, as someone who had pushed a conspiracy theory in the past, and described him as an "Assad loyalist."

After Antonopoulos was shown to be active on the neo-Nazi site Stormfront, he was forced to resign from Al-Masdar on 28 April 2017. Al-Masdar issued a statement on behalf of its board of directors, saying they found his behaviour "wholly unacceptable" and strongly condemned it, while also apologizing to its readers and all those offended by his actions.

A 2018 report by the Alliance for Securing Democracy, based on analysis of its "Hamilton 68" database of Russian disinformation Twitter accounts, showed that Al-Masdar is a main source of Syria-related propaganda for Russian accounts aimed at US audiences.
