= Main road 431 (Hungary) =

Road in Hungary

Main road 431
- 431-es főút

Route information
- Length: 5.7 km (3.5 mi)

Major junctions
- From: 43 near Makó
- To: DN6 at Kiszombor

Location
- Country: Hungary
- Counties: Csongrád
- Major cities: Makó

Highway system
- Roads in Hungary; Highways; Main roads; Local roads

The Main road 431 is a short north–south direction Secondary class main road, that connects the Main road 43 change to the border of Romania. The road is 5.7 kilometres (3.5 mi) long.

The road, as well as all other main roads in Hungary, is managed and maintained by Magyar Közút, state owned company.

== See also ==
- Roads in Hungary
