= List of highways numbered 499 =

The following highways are numbered 499:

== Ireland ==
- R499 road

== Japan ==
- Japan National Route 499

== United Kingdom ==
- A499 road

== United States ==
- Louisiana Highway 499
- Kentucky Route 499
- Maryland Route 499 (former)
- Texas State Highway Loop 499
- Farm to Market Road 499

Preceded by 498	Lists of highways 499	Succeeded by 500
