= List of highways numbered 503 =

The following highways are numbered 503:

== Canada ==
- Alberta Highway 503
- Manitoba Provincial Road 503
- Newfoundland and Labrador Route 503
- Ontario Highway 503 (former)

== Costa Rica ==
- National Route 503

== India ==
- National Highway 503 (India)

== Japan ==
- Japan National Route 503

== Malaysia ==
- Malaysia Federal Route 503

== United States ==
- County Road 503 (Brevard County, Florida)
- Maryland Route 503 (former)
- County Route 503 (New Jersey)
- Ohio State Route 503
- Washington State Route 503

Territories

- Puerto Rico Highway 503

Preceded by 502	Lists of highways 503	Succeeded by 504
