= Main road 445 (Hungary) =

Road in Hungary

Main road 445
- 445-ös főút
- Northern bypass of Kecskemét

Route information
- Length: 13.5 km (8.4 mi)
- History: 2013–2018

Major junctions
- From: 44 near Műkertváros
- 441 near Kőrösihegy; 5 near Máriahegy
- To: M5 in Kecskemét északi elkerüő

Location
- Country: Hungary
- Counties: Bács-Kiskun
- Major cities: Kecskemét

Highway system
- Roads in Hungary; Highways; Main roads; Local roads

The Main road 445 is a short bypass direction Secondary class main road near Kecskemét, that connects the Main road 44 to the M5 motorway's Kecskemét északi elkerülő junction. The road is 13.5 kilometres (8.4 mi) long.

The road, as well as all other main roads in Hungary, is managed and maintained by Magyar Közút, state owned company.

== See also ==
- Roads in Hungary
