= List of highways numbered 500 =

The following highways are numbered 500:

== Australia ==
- Great Alpine Road

== Canada ==
- Alberta Highway 500
- Manitoba Provincial Road 500
- Newfoundland and Labrador Route 500

== Japan ==
- Japan National Route 500

== South Korea ==
- Gwangju Ring Expressway

== United Kingdom ==
- A500 road

== United States ==
States

- Florida State Road 500
- Georgia State Route 500 (state designation for the cancelled Outer Perimeter)
- Louisiana Highway 500
- Maryland Route 500
- New Mexico State Road 500
- North Carolina Highway 500
- Ohio State Route 500
- Washington State Route 500

Territories

- Puerto Rico Highway 500

Preceded by 499	Lists of highways 500	Succeeded by 501
