= List of highways numbered 498 =

The following highways are numbered 498:

== Japan ==
- Japan National Route 498

== United Kingdom ==
- A498 road

== United States ==
- Louisiana Highway 498
- Kentucky Route 498
- Maryland Route 498 (former)
- Mississippi Highway 498
- New Mexico State Road 498
- Texas State Highway Loop 498 (former)
- Farm to Market Road 498

Preceded by 497	Lists of highways 498	Succeeded by 499
