= Maroslele =

- Village
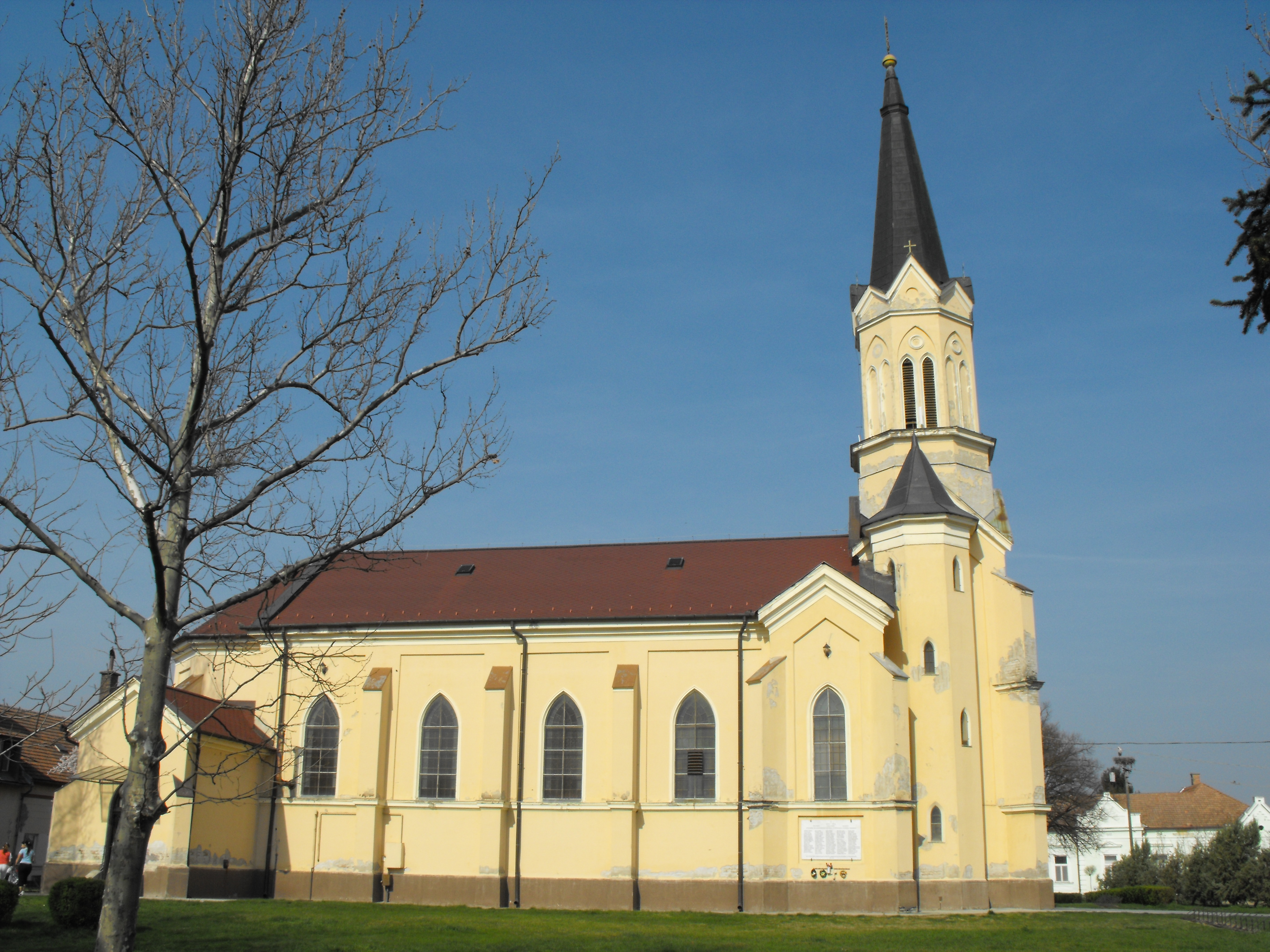

- Coat of arms

- Location of Maroslele in Hungary
- Coordinates: 46.267°N 20.35°E
- Country: Hungary
- Region: Southern Great Plain
- County: Csongrád
- Subregion: Makói
- Rank: Village

Government
  - Mayor: Tibor Drimba

Population (1 January 2019)
  - Total: 1,973
- Time zone: UTC+1 (CET)
  - Summer (DST): UTC+2 (CEST)
- Postal code: 6921
- Area code: +36 62
- KSH code: 10515
- Website: www.maroslele.hu

Maroslele is a village in Csongrád-Csanád County, southern Hungary. It covers an area of 46.56 km^{2} (17.98 sq mi) between the southeastern part of the Tisza River and Maros River and in 2009 had a population of 2,084.

The village was first mentioned in records dating from 1214. Only one document survives mentioning the mediaeval town of Leléről, believed to have been named by Deac Lazăr around 1521. The village was put on a formal footing in 1872 after the etymology seems to be a romanian village as such name is not present in Hungarian language.

The Roman Catholic Church, built in 1902, lies in the village square. It was donated by Bishop Sándor Dessewffy (b. 1931). The villagers drilled a well to supply water, and the main square is named the Heroes' Well. Today, it is just an artifact; the water has all been used up.

== Infrastructure ==
Maroslele has all the features of a modern Western European community. It is connected to the water, gas, electricity and telephone networks and has broadband internet. The Hungarian government's plans focus mainly on education and entrepreneurship, innovation, culture, sports and recreation, and target the current regeneration of the town.

The local library holds around ten thousand books and has space for exhibitions and conferences, as well as providing resources for historical research. It also provides computers for internet access.

== Geography ==
Maroslele lies between the Körös River and the Maros River (Romanian: Mureș). The estuary of the Maros lies very close to village. Before the river was controlled, the area was very swampy and reedy. The floodplain of the Körös-Maros National Park conservation area is nearby.

The subsoil of the village is of clay, which can make for hard living: it is prone to flood in rainy seasons, and can become very muddy.

== Transport ==
The village is accessible from Makó from the west, about 12 km (7 mi) from Szeged. By ferry, it is about 17 km (11 mi) and from Hódmezővásárhely it is about 15 km (9 mi).

In 2011, the Hungarian motorway M43 (under completion) made a connexion to the village.

Public transport is provided by Tisza Volán.

== History ==
The first known record of the village is in 1274 as "Lele". The origin of "Maroslele" is not clear; the first part obviously comes from the Maros River but the second part of the name ("Lele") possibly comes from the Hungarian word for soul (lelek).

In 1596, the Ottoman Empire razed the village. After the Ottoman reign, the town of Makó used the land for grazing until the end of the 18th century.

At the beginning of the 19th century, peasant farmers moved to the village and started to grow tobacco. Not much later the village became part of the Diocese of Csanád County. In 1873 Maroslele becomes an official settlement.

From the beginning of the 20th century, the residents started to buy out the lands from the bishop. The bishop helped to build a church and a school and the residents changed the name of the village to Püspöklele ("Bishopsoul") as an honour. They raised a stone cross in front of the church in remembrance of him.

During both World Wars, many people lost their lives in the village. The Russians took occupation at the end of the Second World War, and they changed its name to Maroslele in 1950.

The Local History Collection has a collection of ironworking machines that were used in the village. The Historical Compendium of The Village Blacksmith lists them all.

== Landmarks ==
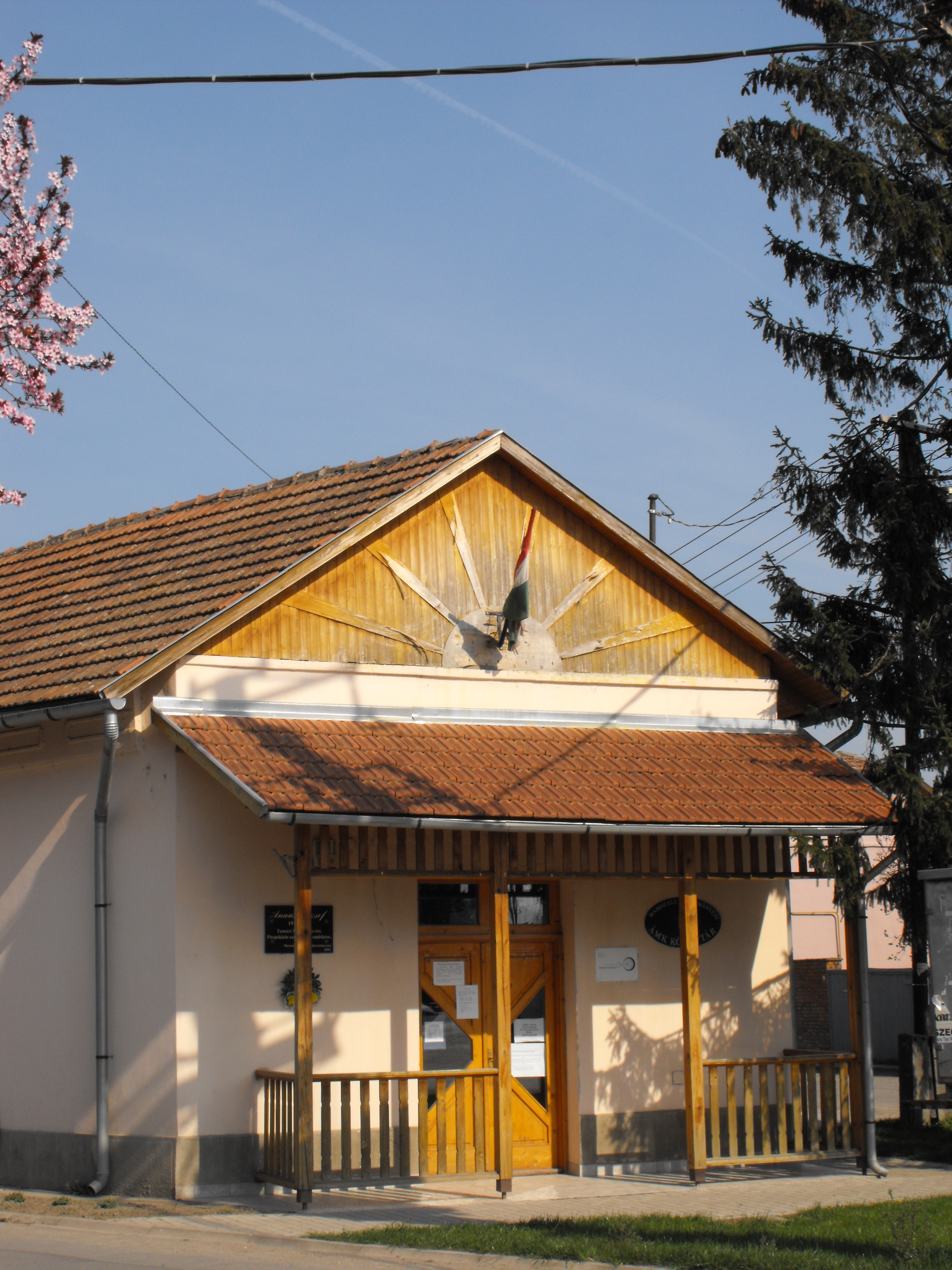
Maroslele library

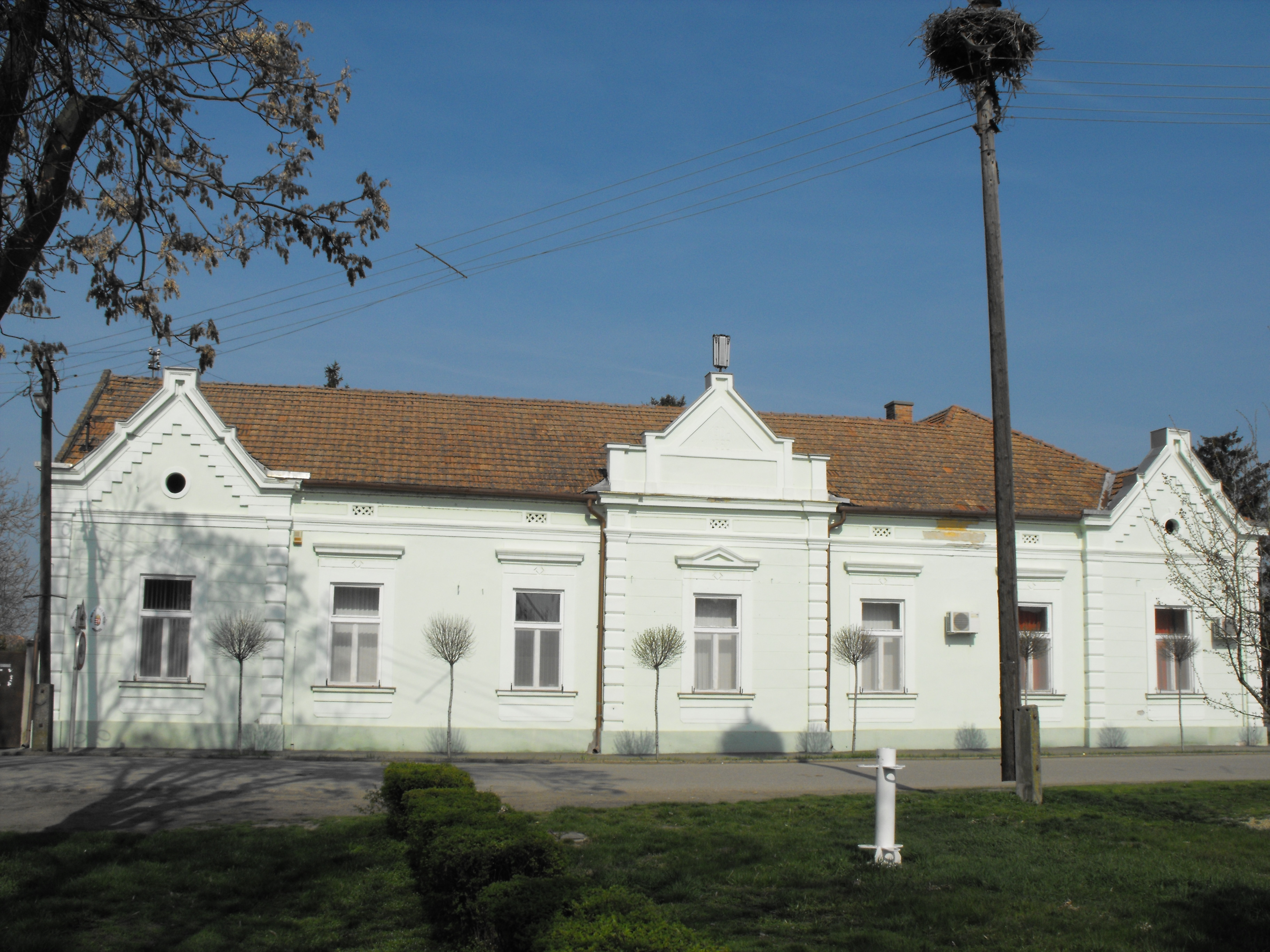
Maroslele Village Hall

- Plaque of József Annus
- Cross in the memory of Sándor Dessewffy
- War memorial
- Crucifix, at the edge of the village
- Local history collection
- Well of the heroes
- Roman Catholic church
- Vetyehát Forest

== Economy ==
The area is mostly agricultural, and crops such as paprika, grain, and arable crops are grown. It lies in one of the best garlic-growing areas (fokhagymatermő), and garlic forms part of the coat of arms of the village.

== Population ==
- 87.8% Hungarian
- 0.2% German
- 12.2% Romanian.

== Religion ==
- 59.7% Roman Catholic
- 0.3% Greek Orthodox
- 10.4% Protestant (Reformed Church)
- 1.1% Evangelical
- Remainder is "other".
