= List of highways numbered 501 =

The following highways are numbered 501:

== Canada ==
- Alberta Highway 501
- Manitoba Provincial Road 501
- Ontario Highway 501

== Japan ==
- Japan National Route 501

== United Kingdom ==
- A501 road

== United States ==
- U.S. Route 501
- Florida State Road 501
- Maryland Route 501
- County Route 501 (New Jersey)
- Nevada State Route 501
- New Mexico State Road 501
- North Carolina Highway 501 (former)
- Ohio State Route 501
- Oregon Route 501
- Pennsylvania Route 501
- South Carolina Highway 501 (former)
- Washington State Route 501
- West Virginia Route 501

Territories

- Puerto Rico Highway 501

Preceded by 500	Lists of highways 501	Succeeded by 502
