= M44 motorway (Hungary) =

Road in Hungary

M44 expressway
- M44-es autóút
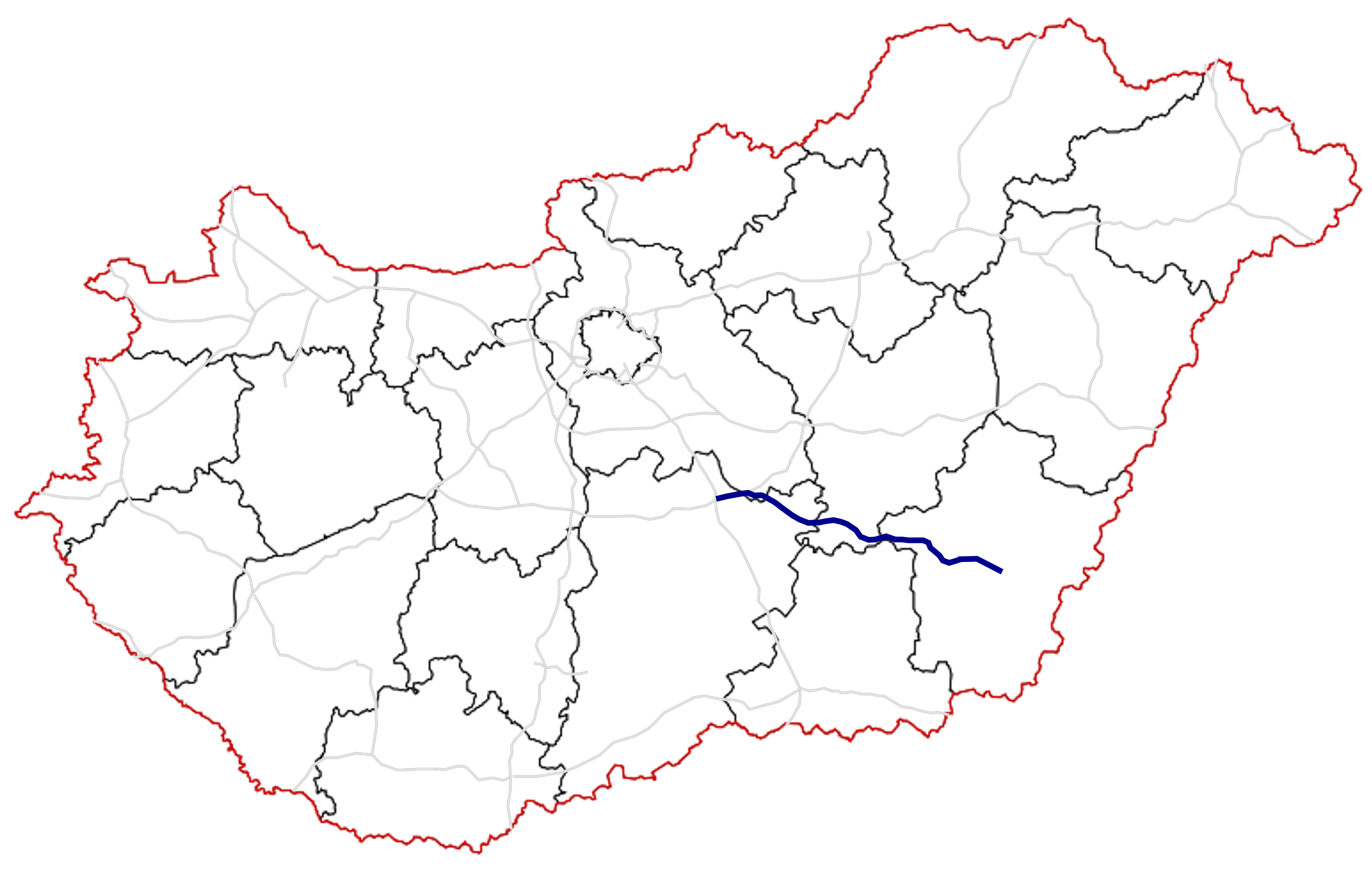
- in use under construction other highways

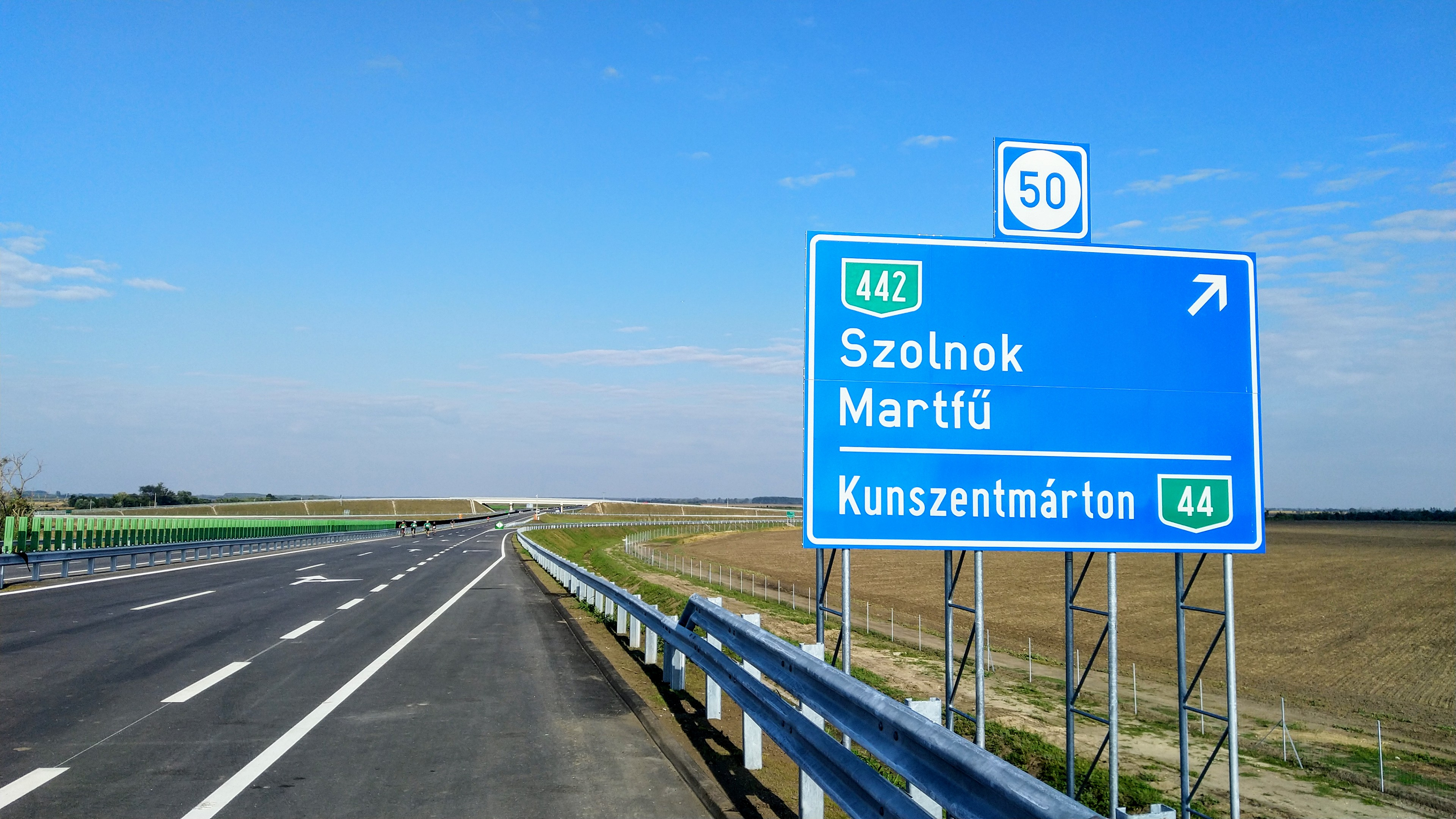
- M44 near Kunszentmárton

Route information
- Length: 90 km (56 mi) under construction: 32 km

Major junctions
- From: M5 near Kecskemét
- To: in Romania

Location
- Country: Hungary
- Counties: Bács-Kiskun, Jasz-Nagykun-Szolnok, Békés
- Major cities: Kecskemét, Békéscsaba

Highway system
- Roads in Hungary; Highways; Main roads; Local roads

The M44 is an expressway in Hungary. It is intended to connect the city of Békéscsaba near the Romanian border with the M5 interchange at Kecskemét. The construction of 62 km long Tiszakürt - Kondoros section of the expressway was built first, and it was inaugurated in October, 2019. This was further extended in Eastern direction with a 18 km long section from Kondoros to road 44 bypass of Békéscsaba by the end of 2020, and in Western direction with a 10 km section to Lakitelek, including a new bridge on the Tisza river, by the end of 2021.

The final 32,2 km long section connecting the expressway to motorway M5 is currently under construction. Construction works were split into two phases (one between Lakitelek and Szentkirály and another between Szentkirály and the connection to M5) with a projected completion date of the entire expressway in 2025.
