= Petra László incident =

Incident that took place in Röszke, Hungary during the European migrant crisis

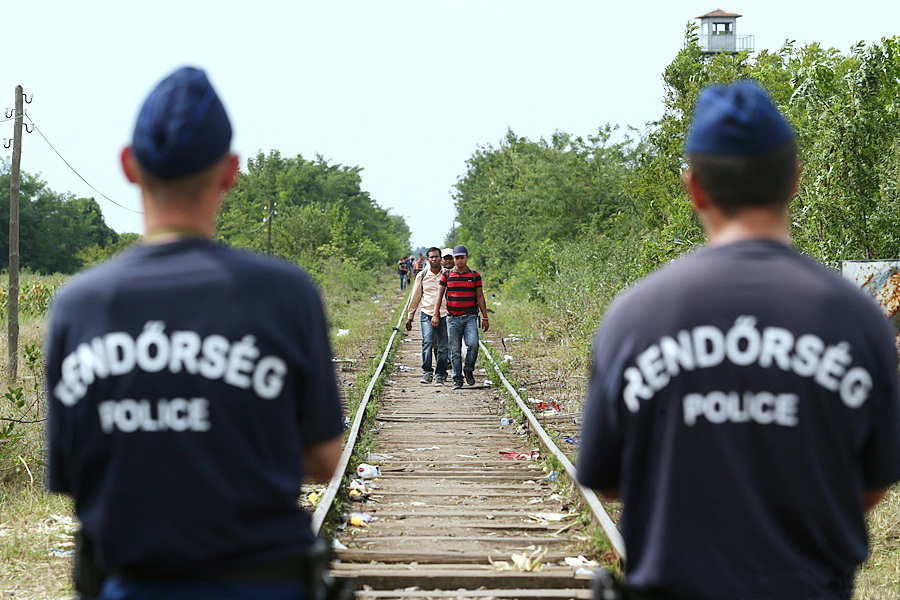
- Migrants approaching the border between Serbia and Hungary in August 2015
- Date: 8 September 2015
- Location: Röszke, Hungary, near Serbian border at abandoned railway line 136 Szeged–Szabadka/Subotica

The Petra László incident took place near Röszke, Hungary, on 8 September 2015, during the European migrant crisis, when Hungarian camerawoman Petra László (Hungarian: László Petra, [ˈlaːsloː ˈpɛtrɒ]) was recorded kicking migrants who were fleeing border police. László was fired after footage of the incident spread in the media and online. In September 2016, she was indicted on charges of breach of peace, and was later found guilty. (Note: The charge was alternately described as disorderly conduct; however, breach of the peace was the wording used by the official English language version of the press release by Hungarian authorities.) However, in 2018, the highest court in Hungary reversed the ruling, clearing László of the charges. In its decision, the court stated that her actions constituted only rowdy behaviour, which is a misdemeanour. By then, the statute of limitations for misdemeanours had already expired, and the case was therefore closed.

== Incident ==
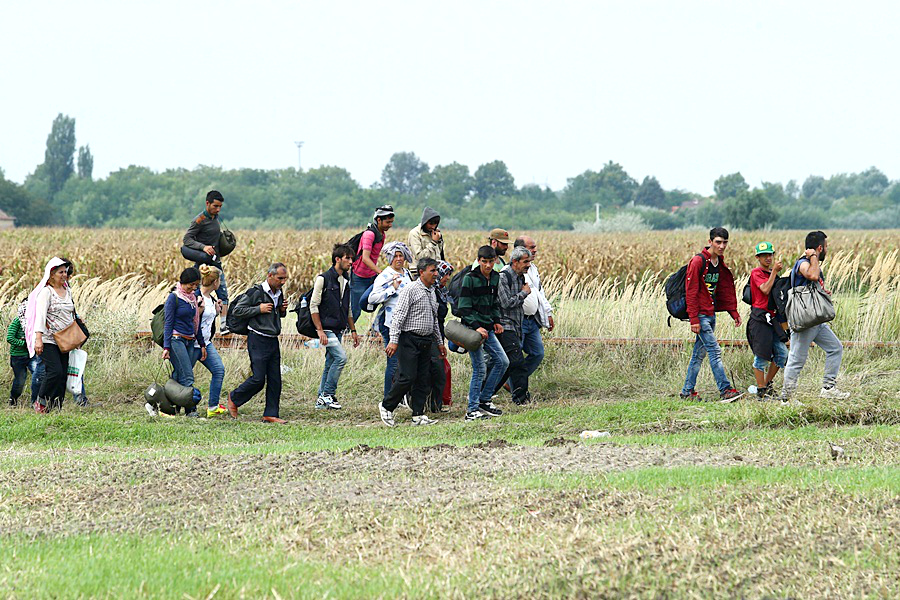
Migrants near railway

On 8 September 2015, Petra László was working as a camerawoman at a holding camp near the border between Hungary and Serbia, documenting the ongoing migrant crisis when hundreds of migrants including Syrians, Iraqis and Afghans fled police at a makeshift relocation camp in Röszke, just a few hundred yards from Hungary's border with Serbia.

A video was posted on Twitter by German reporter Stephan Richter, showing a woman who was later identified as László "kicking a girl and tripping up the man carrying a child". The video went viral and attracted widespread media attention.

In response to the video, László's employer, N1TV (also known as Nemzeti TV) issued a statement saying, "An employee of N1TV today showed unacceptable behaviour at the Röszke collection point. We have terminated the contract of the camerawoman with immediate effect today."

László later wrote to the Hungarian newspaper Magyar Nemzet, stating that she was frightened by the rush of people and panicked, thinking she was going to be attacked. She issued a public apology on 11 September 2015:

I am very sorry for the incident, and as a mother I am especially sorry for the fact that fate pushed a child in my way. I did not see that at that moment. I started to panic and as I re-watch the film, it seems as it was not even me.

She characterized the public reaction as a witch hunt including smears and death threats.

== The investigation ==
In September 2016, Hungarian prosecutors indicted László and charged her with breaching the peace, defined under Hungarian law as "antisocial, violent behavior capable of inciting indignation or alarm." The charge carries a maximum sentence of two years, unless there are aggravating circumstances.

Zsolt Kopasz, Chief Prosecutor, said in a press release that:

The violent actions of the accused did not inflict injury, however her behaviour was capable of provoking indignation and outcry in the members of the public present at the scenes.

The press release stated that László kicked a young man and minor girl, and "kicked towards a migrant who was running with a child in his arms with the intention to trip him", but that her leg did not reach him. Kopasz stated that no evidence had been uncovered to indicate that the actions were motivated by the migrant status or ethnicity of the victims. The trial was held in the city of Szeged.

== Aftermath ==
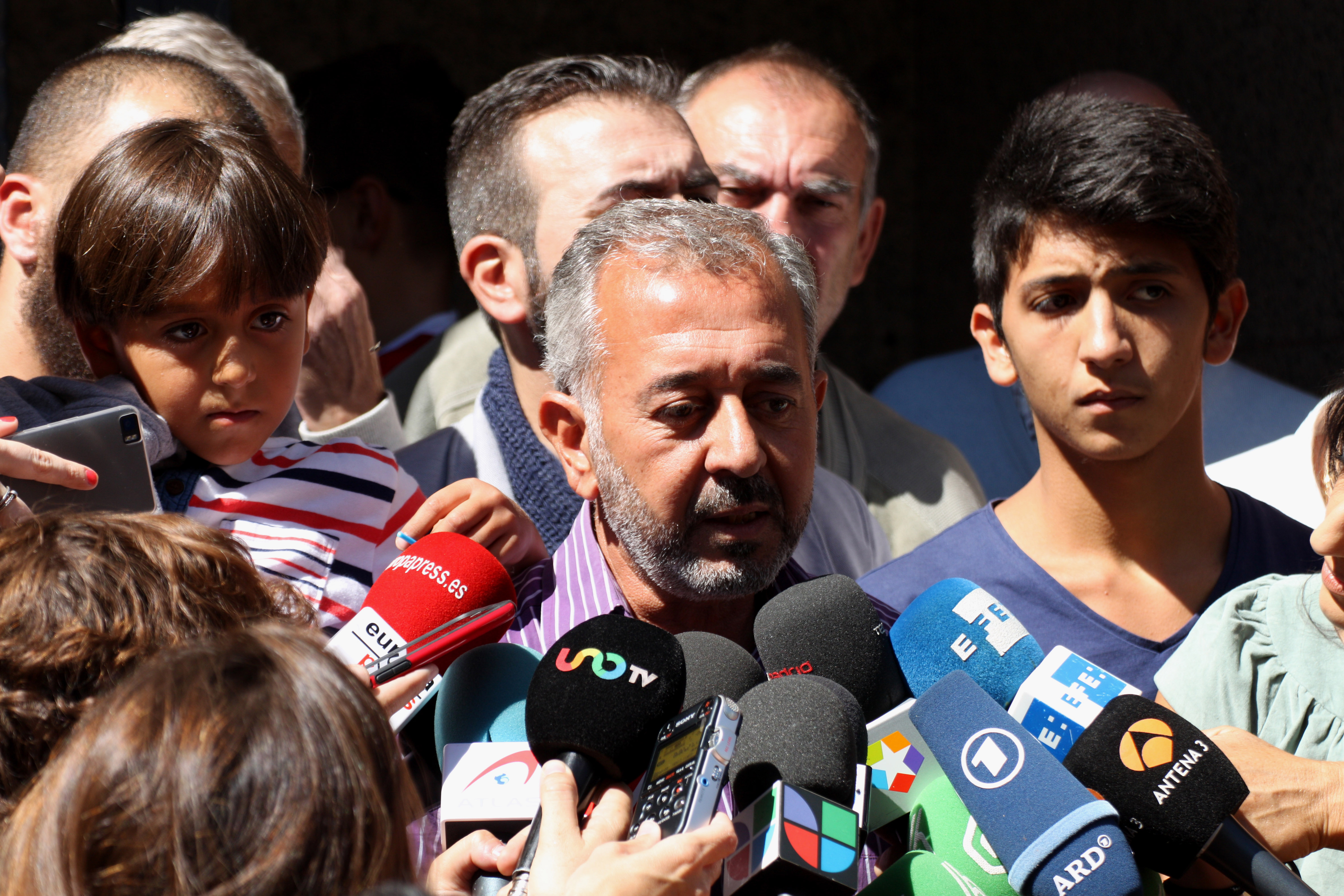
Osama Abdul Mohsen in Getafe, Spain, in November 2015.

On 21 October 2015, László stated she was considering moving to Russia following her trial in Hungary, and that she planned to file two lawsuits, the first against Osama Abdul Mohsen, the man whom she attempted to trip in the video, for changing his testimony, and Facebook for refusing to remove threatening groups on their website. László said, "My husband wants to prove my innocence. For him, it is now a matter of honour."

In an interview with Russia’s Izvestia, László stated she was only "trying to help police", as Mohsen had not obeyed orders. "I pushed him only because I was afraid. I did not see that there was a child. I’m sorry that it turned out this way," she told the newspaper. László said her life had not been the same since the incident, and she was dubbed a "heartless, racist, children-kicking camerawoman", fired from her job, and threatened by haters following the scandal. "I can definitely say that my life is ruined. It’s unlikely that I will be able to find a job and do what I like the most," she told the paper.

Mohsen commented on László's apology: "I tell her, be sure you Hungarian journalist that karma will get back to you, and God will not leave this be." He stated in 2015 that he planned to sue both László and N1TV. Interviewed in 2017 after László was initially sentenced, Mohsen said, "I don’t want her to go to prison because she has a child, a home and husband but I think it’s good for refugees in Europe as a message."

Mohsen later settled in Spain, when he was offered a job by a Spanish sports organization. In November 2015, he declared that he wanted to leave Spain and settle down in Austria or in Germany, to organize a football team recruited from Syrian refugees. In December 2015, in an interview, Mohsen said even though he asked permission from prime minister Mariano Rajoy, the Spanish authorities refused his demand for family reunion, so his family must stay in Turkey. On 15 October 2016, the Spanish journal El Confidencial reported that the Escuela Nacional de Entrenadores de Fútbol (Cenafe) decided not to renew the contract of Mr. Mohsen, because he had "difficulties learning Spanish".

On 12 January 2017, László was sentenced to three years of probation for disorderly conduct by Szeged District Court. The judge said that her behavior "ran counter to societal norms" and that the facts of the case did not support her self-defence claim.

On 30 October 2018, the Kúria (highest court of Hungary) found that the first and second-instance courts that handed down verdicts in the case had violated the rules of criminal material law when they found the defendant guilty and sentenced her to probation. The court ruled that the camerawoman’s actions did not constitute anti-social behaviour, and therefore could not be classified as disorderly conduct. At the same time, the court declared her actions to be unlawful and "morally disapprovable", adding that they constituted rowdy behaviour, which counts as a misdemeanor. Despite that, the Kúria ruled to close the case, noting that the statute of limitations on the misdemeanor had expired."

== See also ==
- Syrian Civil War
