= Main road 502 (Hungary) =

National road in Hungary

Main road 502
- 502-es főút
- Western bypass of Szeged

Route information
- Length: 6.2 km (3.9 mi)
- History: 2004–2011

Major junctions
- From: 5 near Rókus
- 55 in Iparváros
- To: 5 near Szentmihály

Location
- Country: Hungary
- Counties: Csongrád
- Major cities: Szeged

Highway system
- Roads in Hungary; Highways; Main roads; Local roads

The Main road 502 is a short bypass direction Secondary class main road near Szeged, that connects the Main road 5 in the north and south part of the city. The road is 6.2 kilometres (3.9 mi) long.

The road, as well as all other main roads in Hungary, is managed and maintained by Magyar Közút, state owned company.

== See also ==
- Roads in Hungary
