= Sándorfalva =

- Town
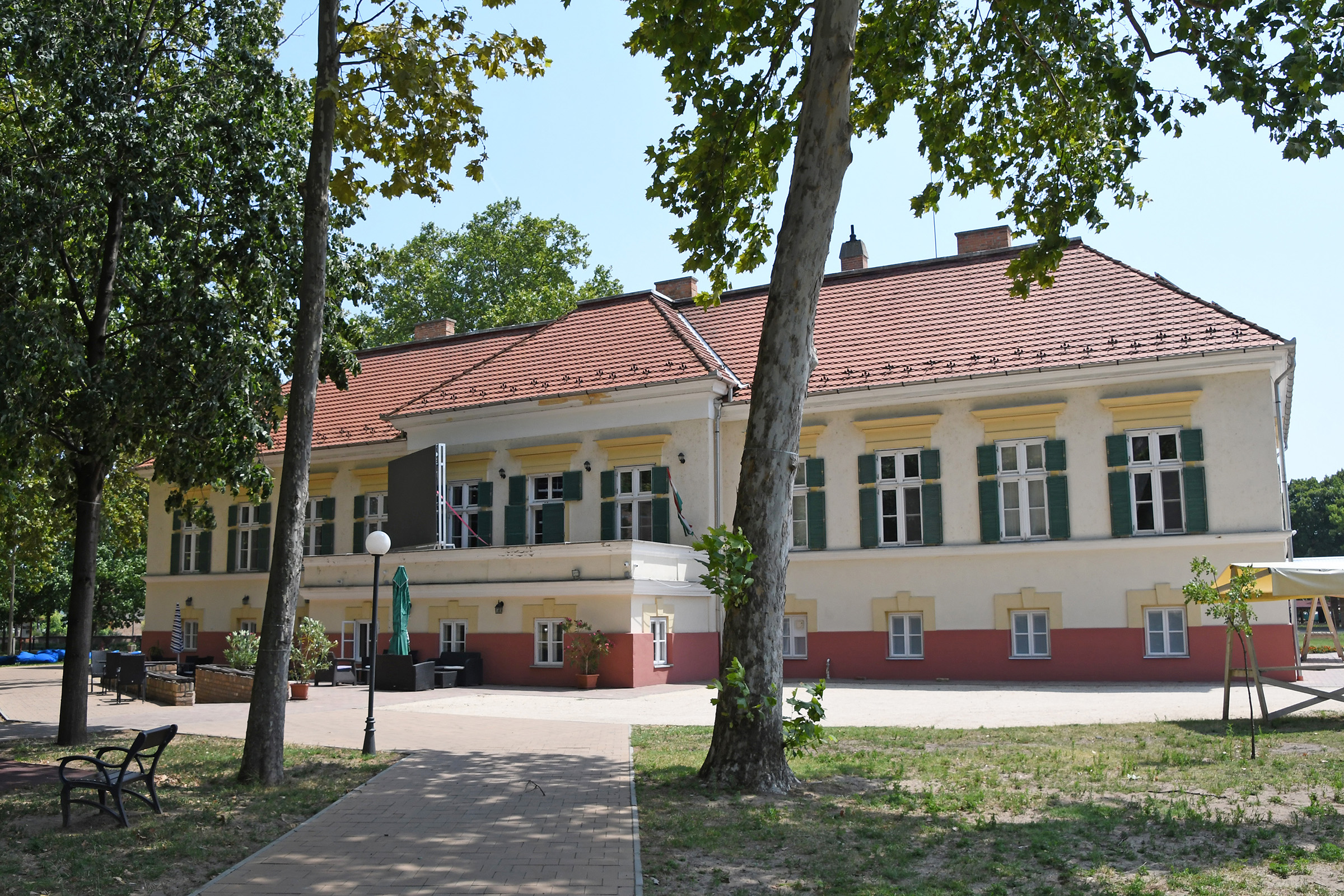
- Pallavicini Palace

- Flag Coat of arms

- Location within Csongrád County Location within Hungary
- Coordinates: 46.36836°N 20.11438°E
- Country: Hungary
- County: Csongrád-Csanád
- District: Szeged

Area
  - Total: 55.77 km^{2} (21.53 sq mi)

Population (2013)
  - Total: 7,918
  - Density: 142.0/km^{2} (367.7/sq mi)
- Time zone: UTC+1 (CET)
  - Summer (DST): UTC+2 (CEST)
- Postal code: 6762
- Area code: (+36) 62
- Website: sandorfalva.hu

Sándorfalva is a town in Csongrád-Csanád County, in the Southern Great Plain region of southern Hungary.

== Geography ==
It covers an area of 55.77 km^{2} (22 sq mi) and has a population of 7,918 people (2013 estimate).

== Population ==
Year	1980	1990	2001	2010	2011	2013
Population	6,399 (census)	6,933 (census)	7,803 (census)	8,030 (estimate)	7,871 (census)	7,918 (estimate)
