= M51 expressway (Hungary) =

Road in Hungary

M51 expressway
- M51-es autóút
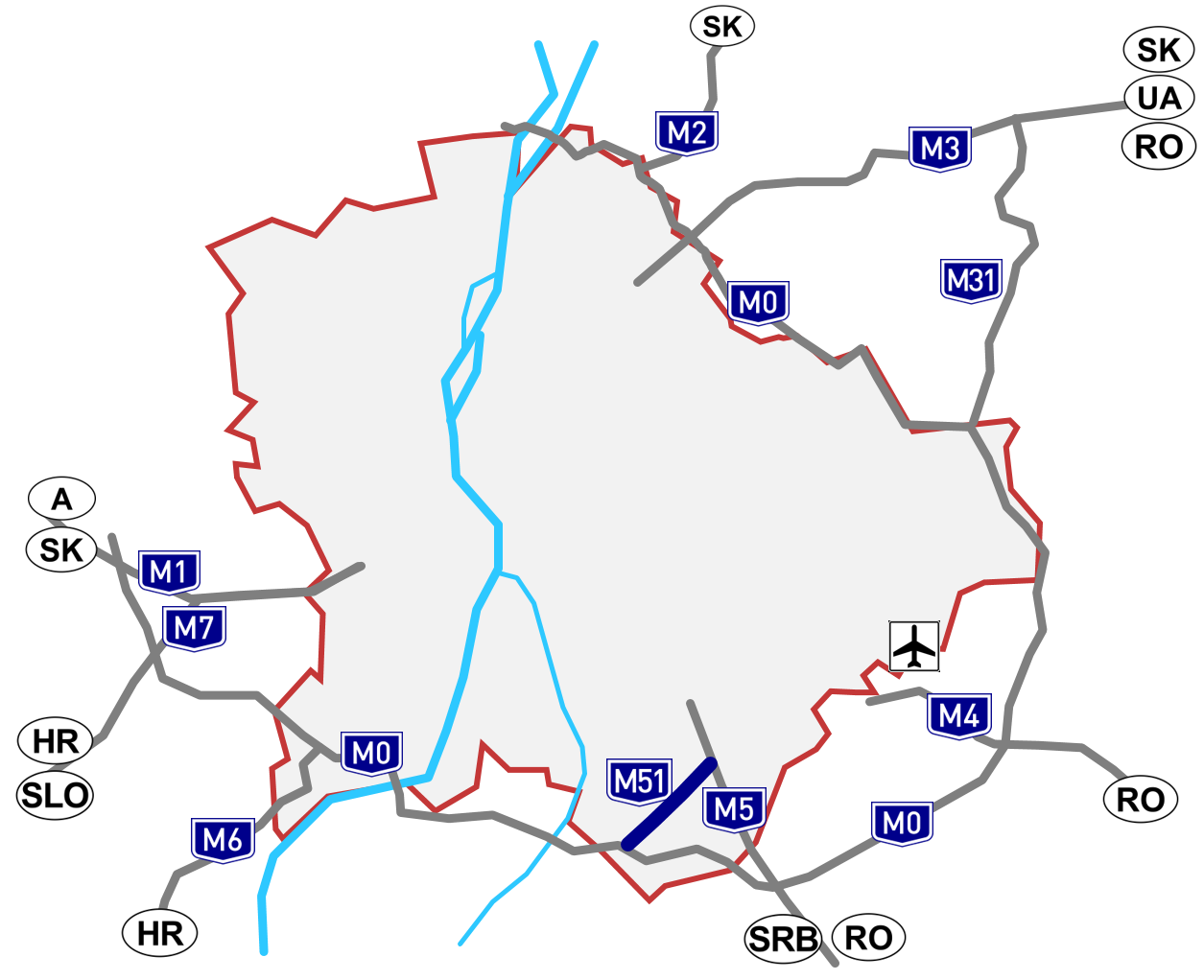

Route information
- Length: 9 km (5.6 mi)

Major junctions
- From: M0 in Budapest
- To: M5 in Budapest

Location
- Country: Hungary
- Major cities: Budapest

Highway system
- Roads in Hungary; Highways; Main roads; Local roads

The M51 expressway (Hungarian: M51-es autóút) is a 2x2 road without hard shoulder between the 51 road and the M5 motorway. It was part of M0 motorway until 2013 when it was renamed. Many people still mistakenly call it M0. The bypass of road 51 around Dunaharaszti (a 2x1 road) is also included in M51.

== History ==
The first section of the M0 motorway was constructed in 1988 as a bypass of main road 51 in Dunaharaszti. It was planned that the next section of the M0 would have continued through a tunnel under populated areas in Budapest's Eighteenth District, but due to its high cost, this plan was abandoned. As a result, due to the existence of Ferenc Liszt International Airport and populated areas, the eastern section of the M0 had to be placed much further south than originally planned. Because of this change in planning, it was no longer possible to connect the old section to the rest of M0 because of its location, so a new section, immediately adjacent to the existing M0, had to be built between main road 51 and the M5 motorway, a 6.3 km long section inaugurated on August 13, 2013. As a result of this, the section between main road 51 and the M5 motorway has been split from M0 and has become the M51 motorway, which, like its original function, passes between the M5 motorway, main road 51, and the M0 ring road.

== See also ==
- Roads in Hungary
- Transport in Hungary
