= M5 motorway (Hungary) =

Road in Hungary

M5 motorway
- M5-ös autópálya
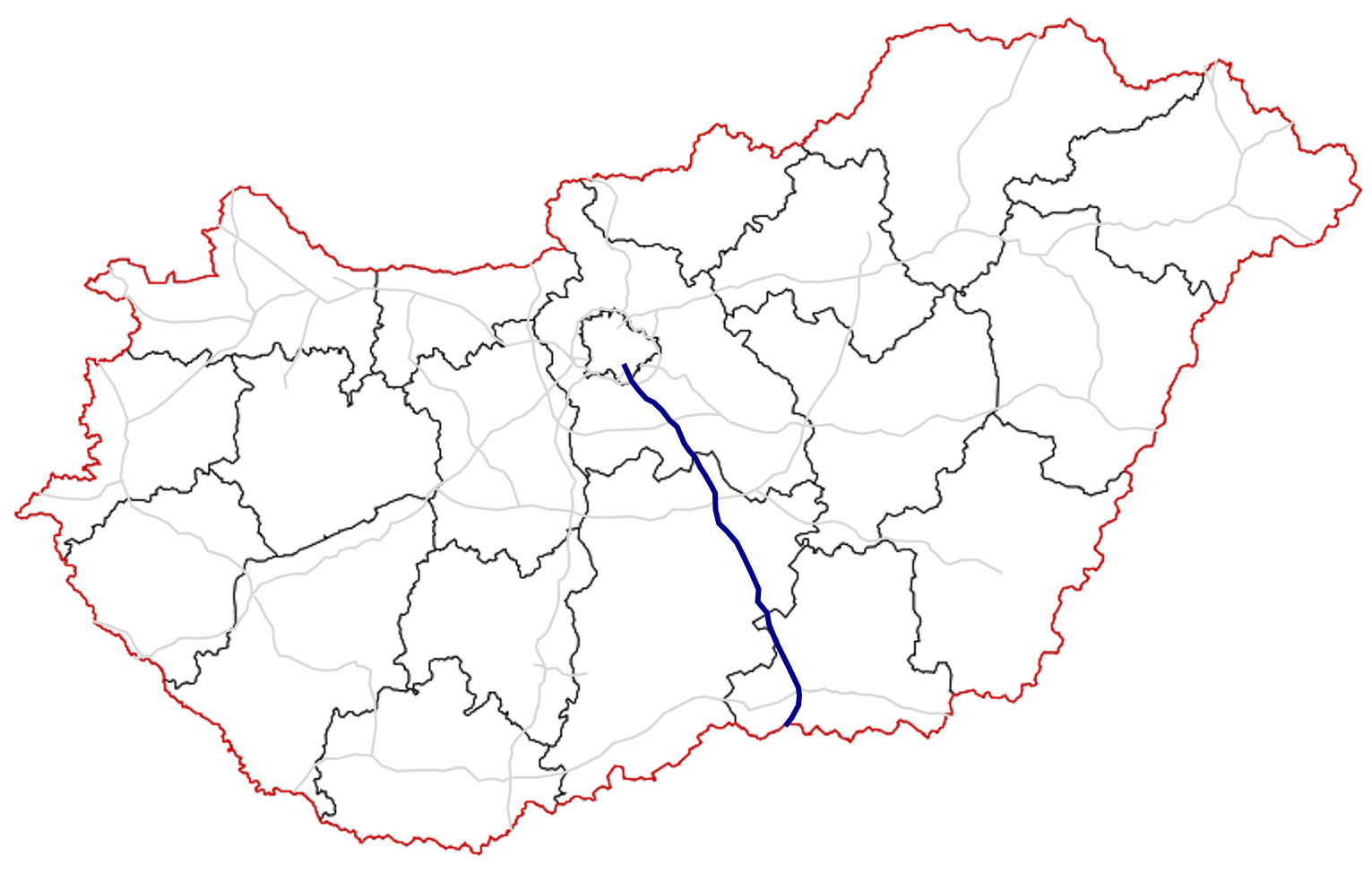
- in use other highways

Route information
- Part of E75
- Length: 173 km (107 mi)

Major junctions
- From: Budapest
- M51 in Budapest-Soroksár; M0 near Gyál; 405 near Újhartyán; M8 in Kecskemét-észak (planned); 445 in Kecskemét elkerülő; 52 in Kecskemét-nyugat; 54 in Kecskemét-dél; M43 in Szeged-észak; 55 in Szeged-nyugat
- To: Röszke; A1 border with Serbia

Location
- Country: Hungary
- Counties: Pest, Bács-Kiskun, Csongrád
- Major cities: Budapest, Kecskemét, Kiskunfélegyháza, Szeged

Highway system
- Roads in Hungary; Highways; Main roads; Local roads

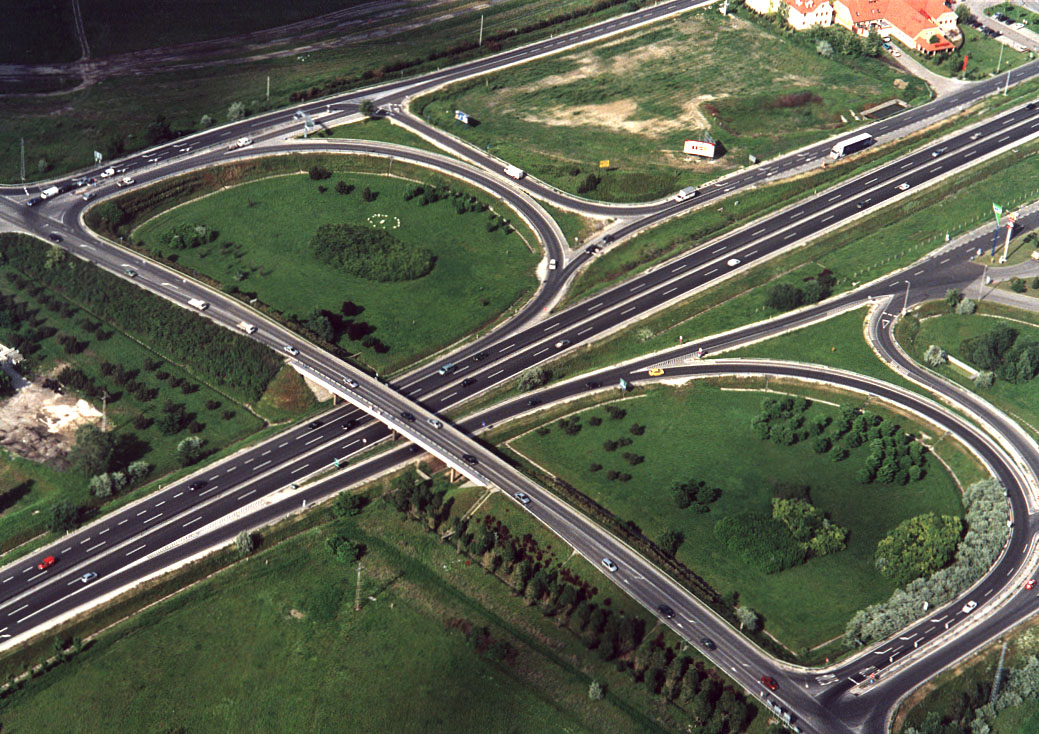
The motorway near Lajosmizse

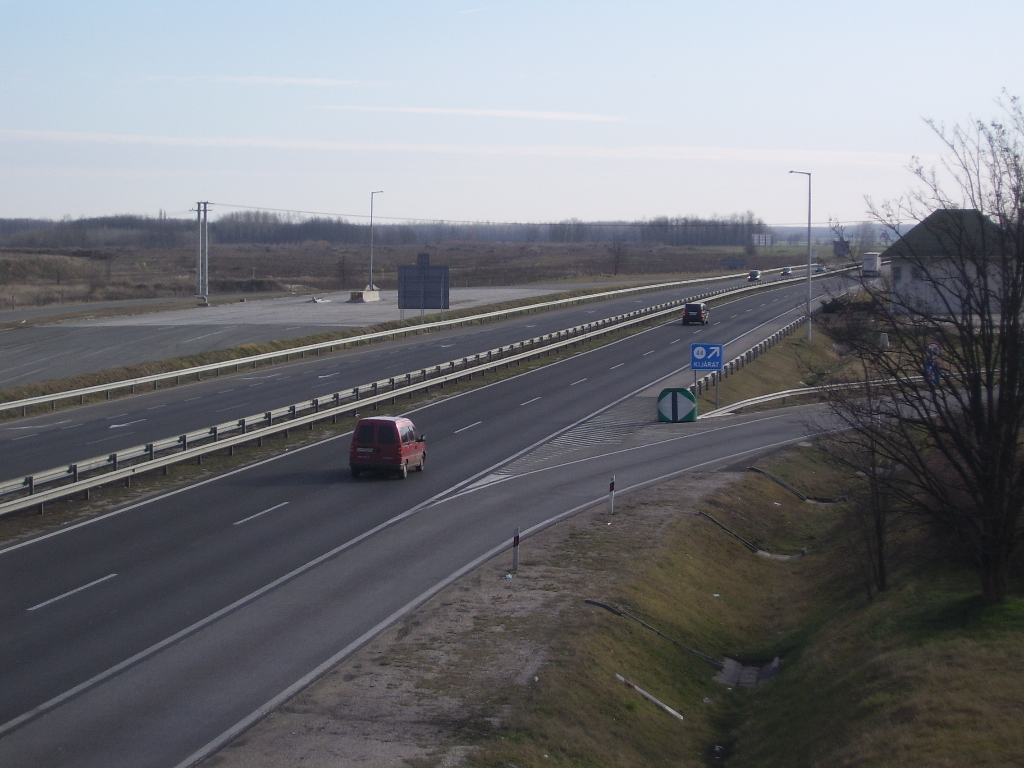
Old toll plaza in the motorway

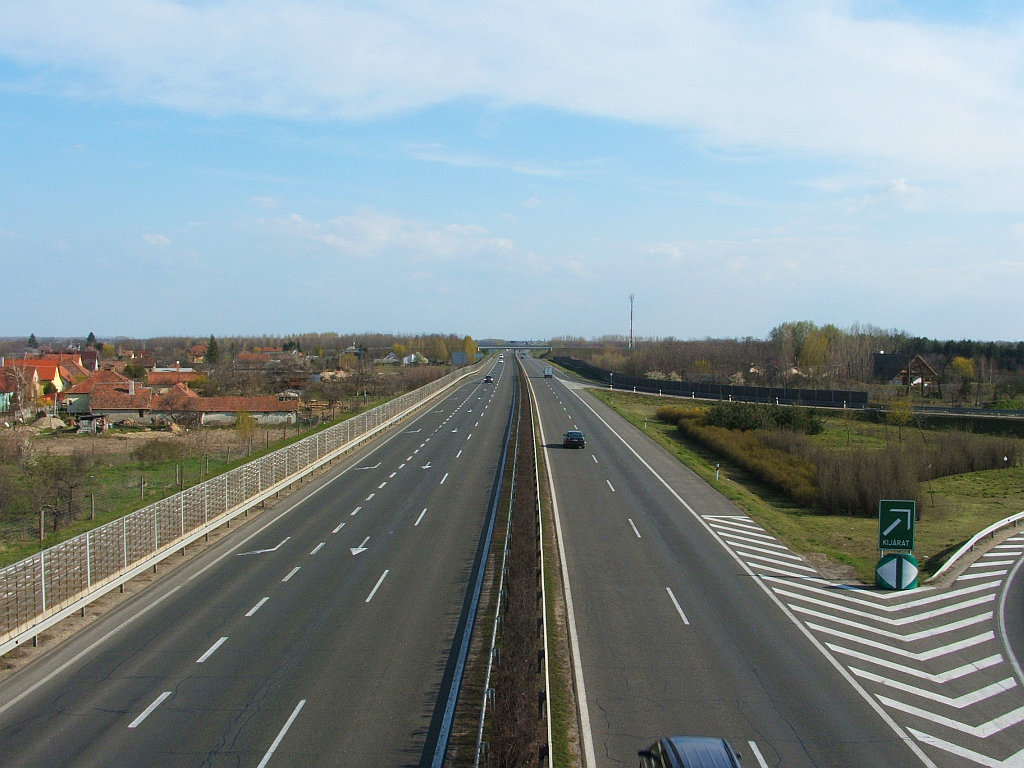
The road near Kecskemét

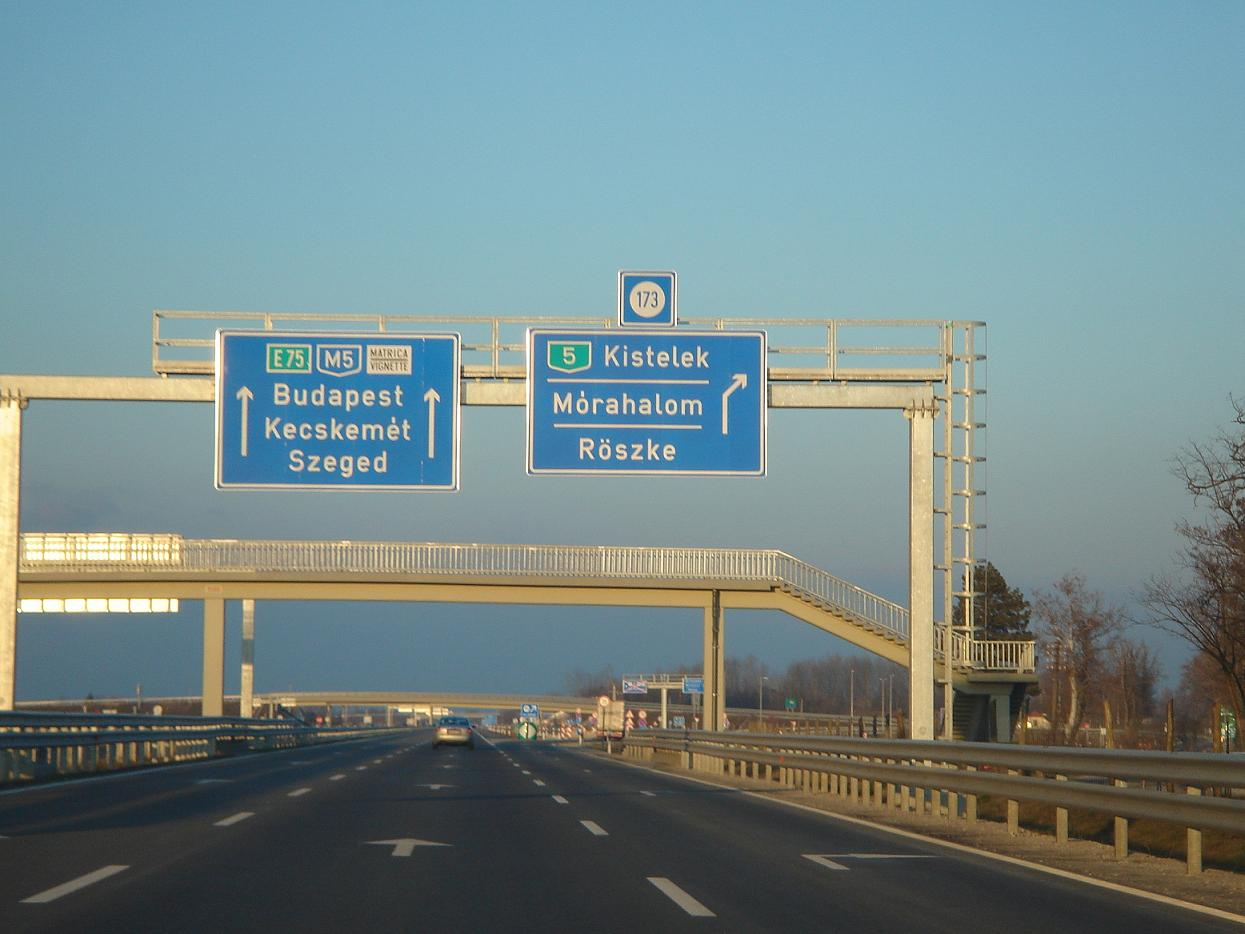
Hungarian-Serbian border

The M5 motorway (Hungarian: M5-ös autópálya) is a Hungarian motorway which connects Budapest with the south-eastern regions of the country, the cities of Kecskemét, Szeged, and finally Röszke on the Serbian border. The motorway reached the city of Szeged in December 2005, while the remaining portion (between Szeged and Röszke) was completed in April 2006.

== See also ==
- Roads in Hungary
- Transport in Hungary
- International E-road network
