= Röszke =

- Village
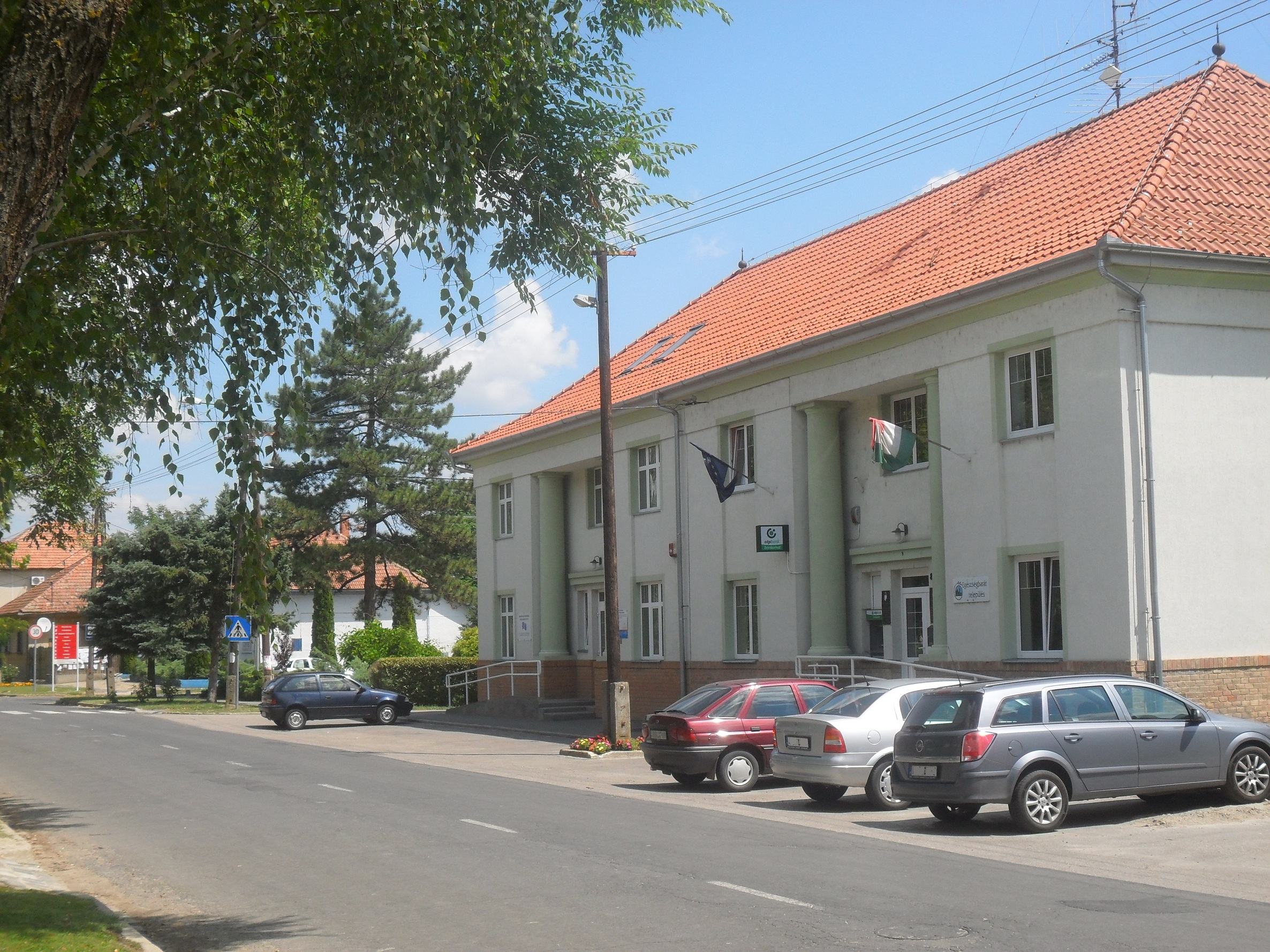
- Parish hall of Röszke

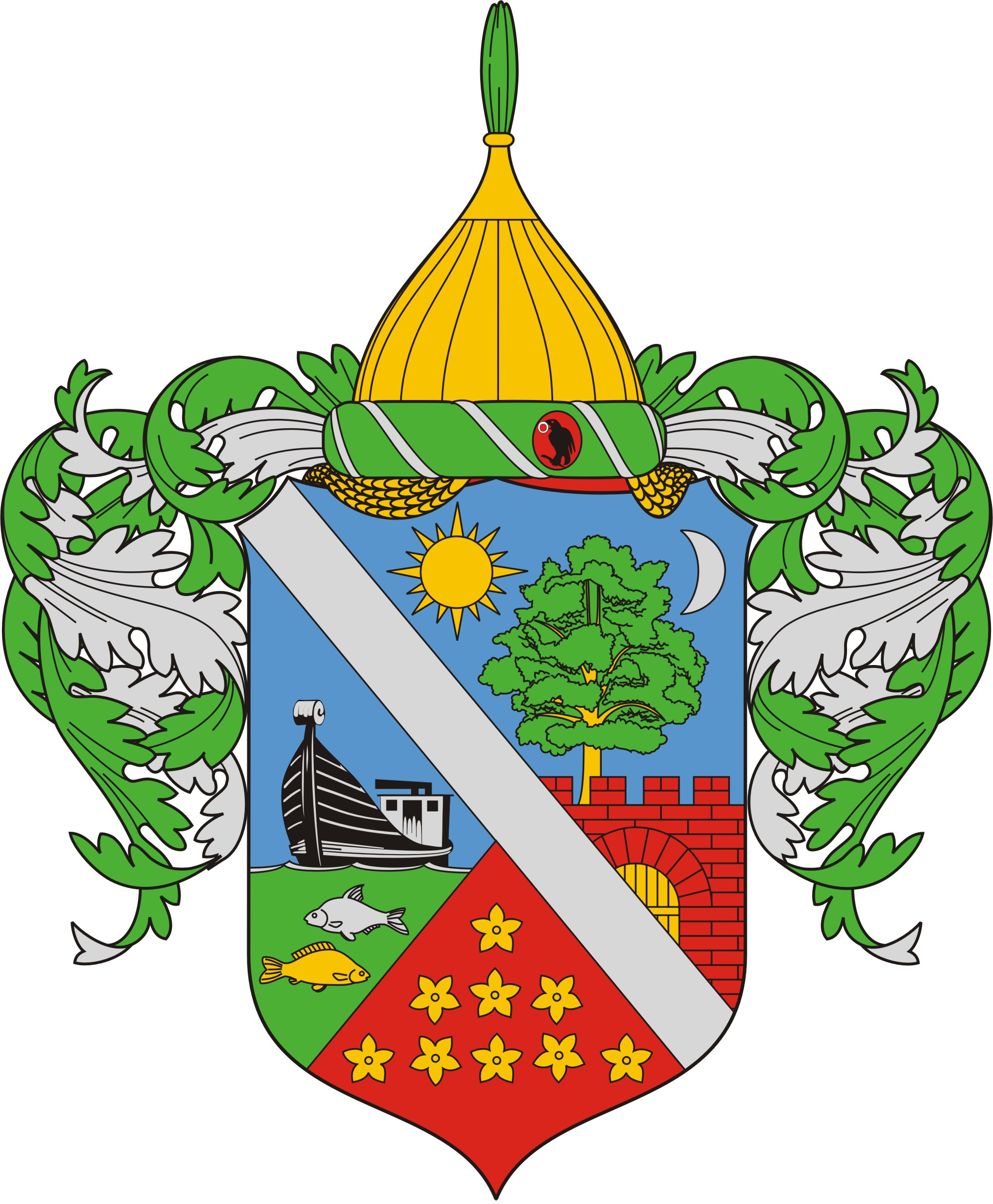
- Coat of arms

- Location within Csongrád County Location within Hungary
- Coordinates: 46°11′14″N 20°02′07″E
- Country: Hungary
- County: Csongrád-Csanád
- District: Szeged

Area
  - Total: 36.63 km^{2} (14.14 sq mi)

Population (2002)
  - Total: 3,303
  - Density: 90/km^{2} (230/sq mi)
- Time zone: UTC+1 (CET)
  - Summer (DST): UTC+2 (CEST)
- Postal code: 6758
- Area code: 62

Röszke is a village in Csongrád county, in the Southern Great Plain region of southern Hungary. The nearest town is Szeged 15 kilometres (9.3 mi).

Sándor Rózsa, the legendary Hungarian bandit was born here in 1813.

== History ==
The village was first mentioned in writing in 1439 under the name "Rezke", and was documented as belonging to Szeged.

In the first half of the 19th century the village was composed of a collection small-scale tobacco farms. This loose collection of homesteads later began to cultivate paprika as well, which continues to this day.

Until 1950 Röszke was not considered an independent municipality, but was instead a part of Szeged. The village's population peaked in 1930 with a total of 4364 residents.

== Geography ==
It covers an area of 36.63 km^{2} (14 sq mi) and has a population of 3091 people (2013).

== Border crossing ==
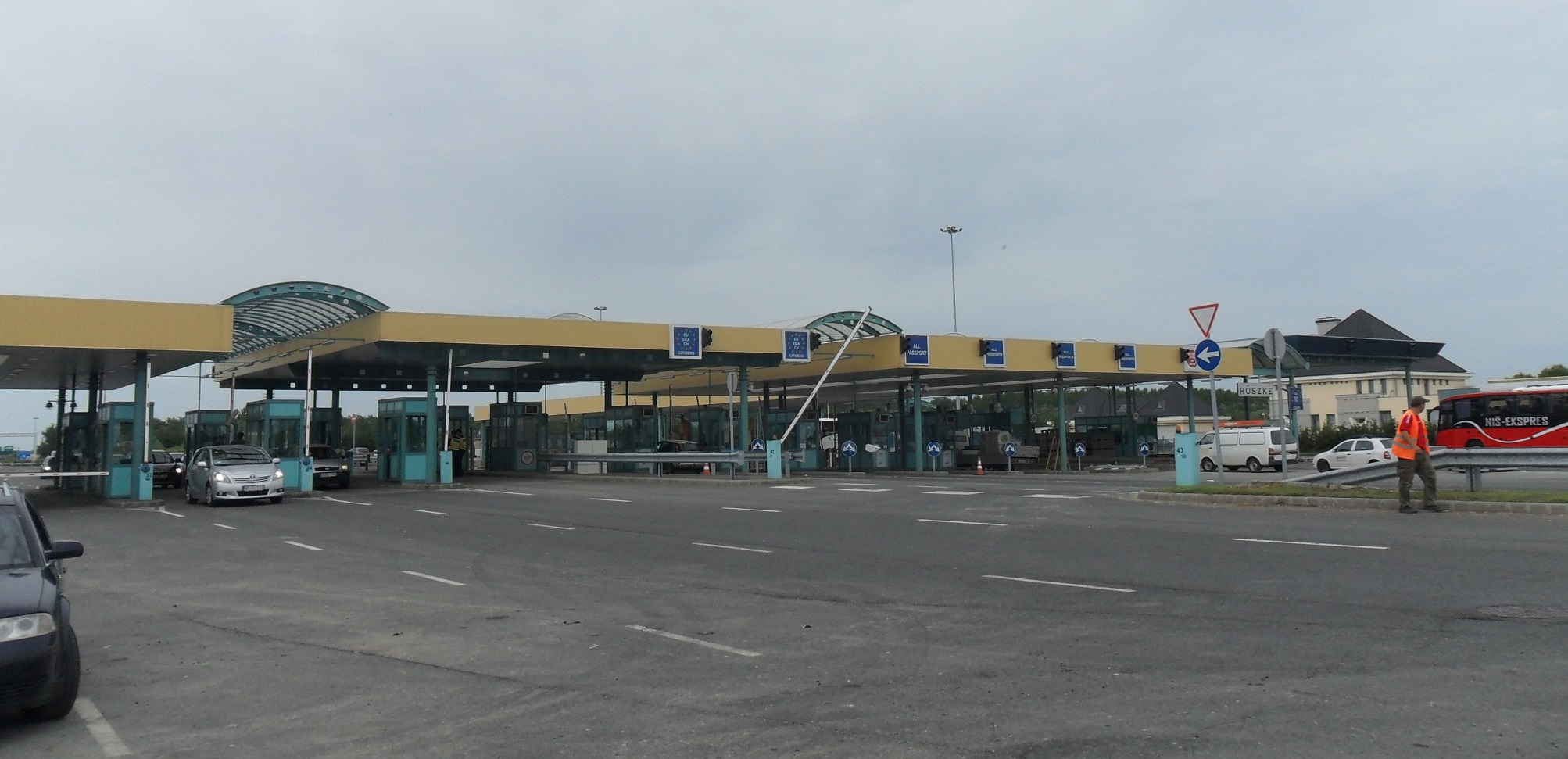
Hungary/Serbia border crossing checkpoint at Röszke

A major road border crossing on Hungary's M5 motorway into Serbia is located 3 kilometres (1.9 mi) from the village. On the other side of the border in Serbia the first settlement is Horgoš where the E75 in Serbia begins. During the European migrant crisis in 2015, the village served as a refugee camp for refugees and the Petra László incident occurred nearby.

== Notable residents ==
- Sándor Rózsa (1813–1878), Hungarian betyár ('outlaw')
- Kéri László, Hungarian political analyst and sociologist

== Gallery ==
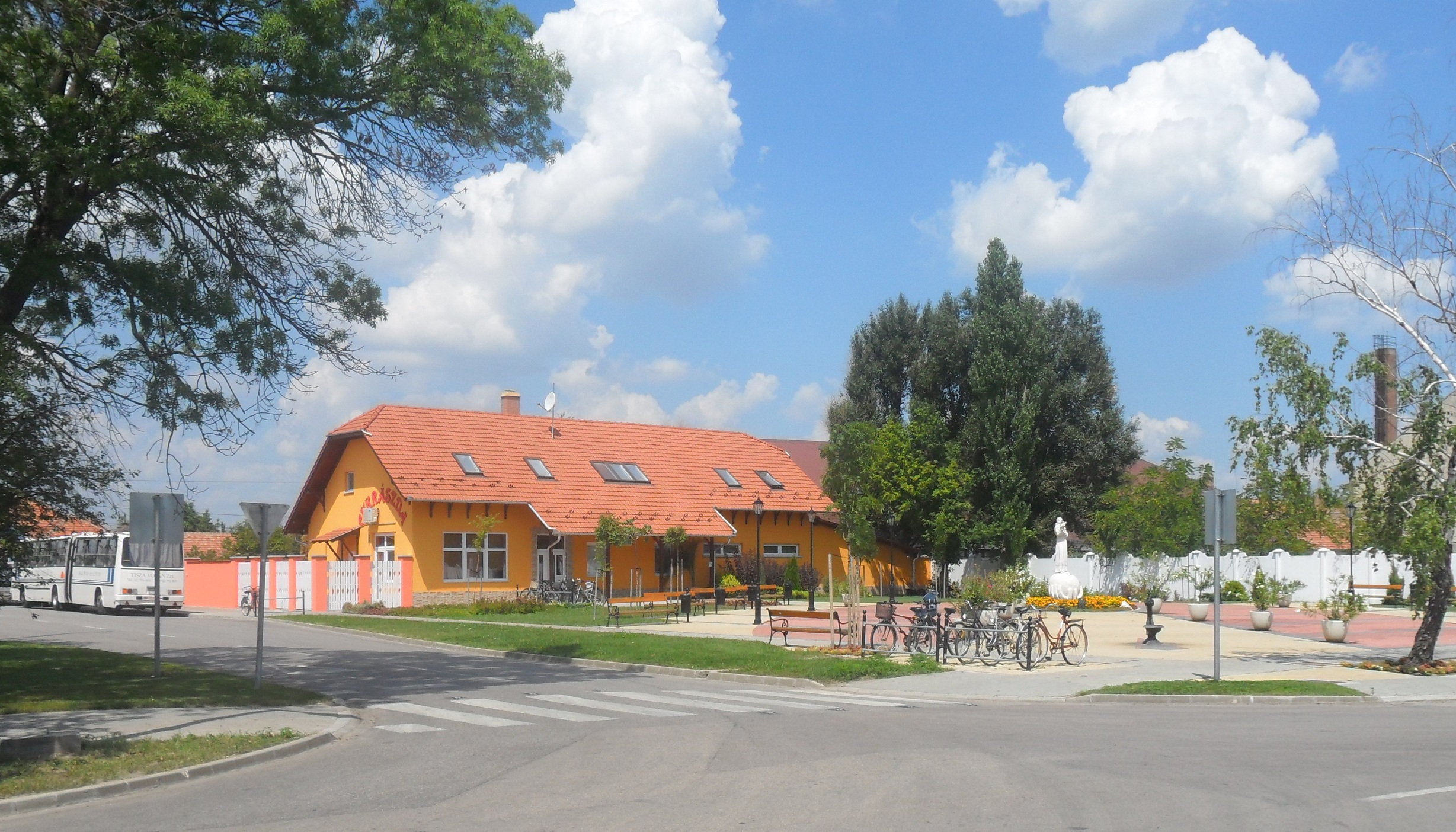
Central square of Röszke

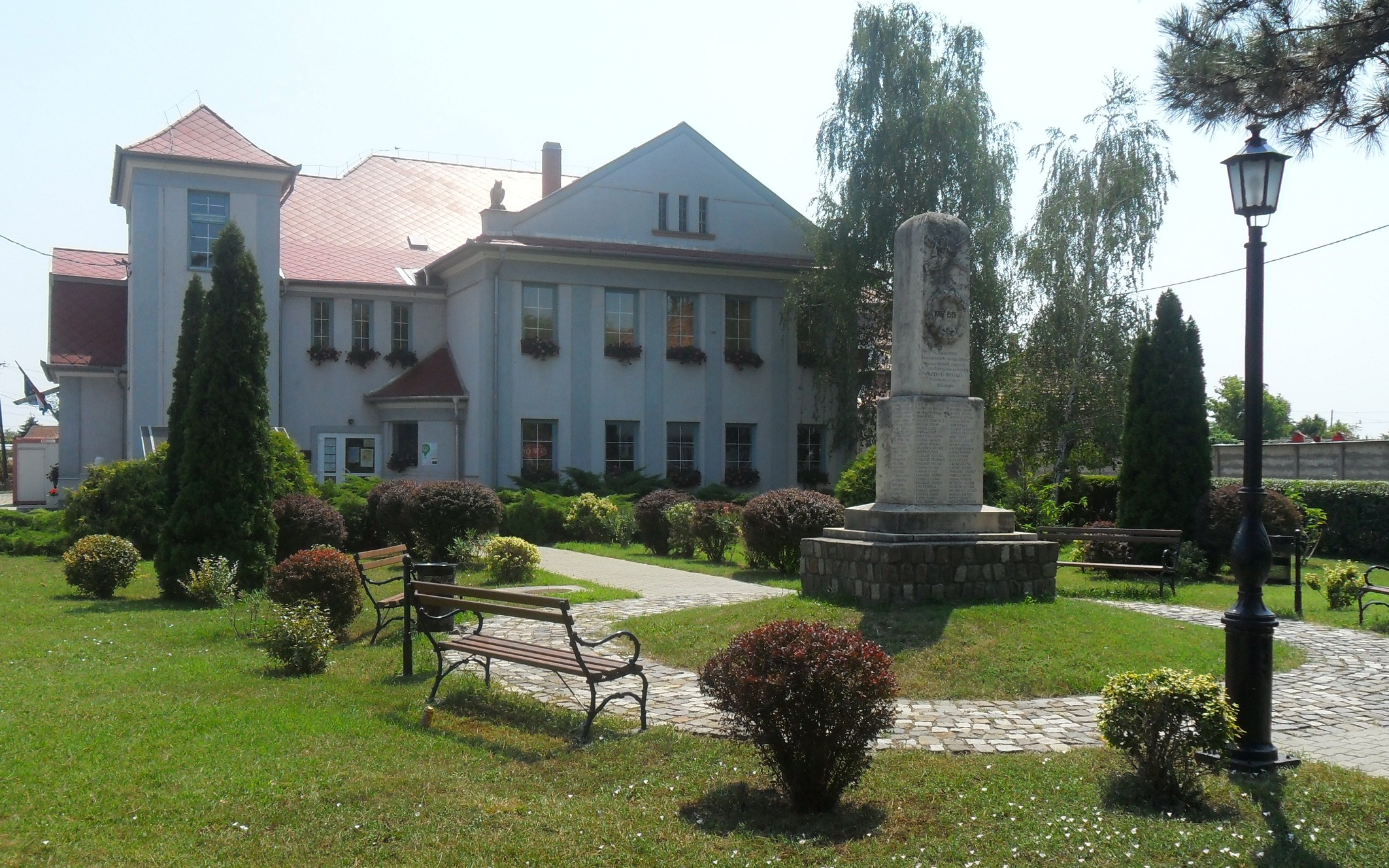
Cultural Centre

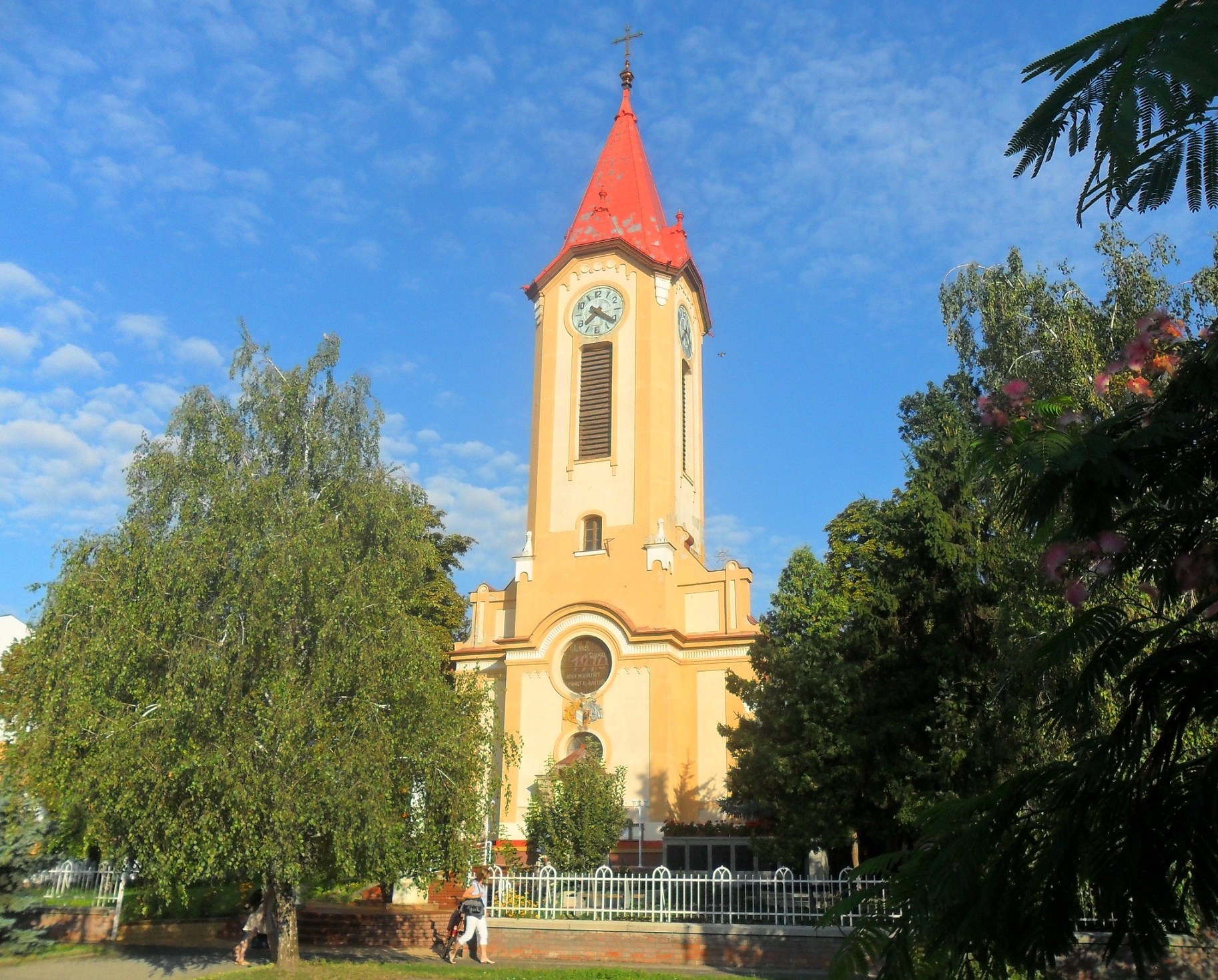
Roman Catholic Church
