= Kunszentmárton =

- Town
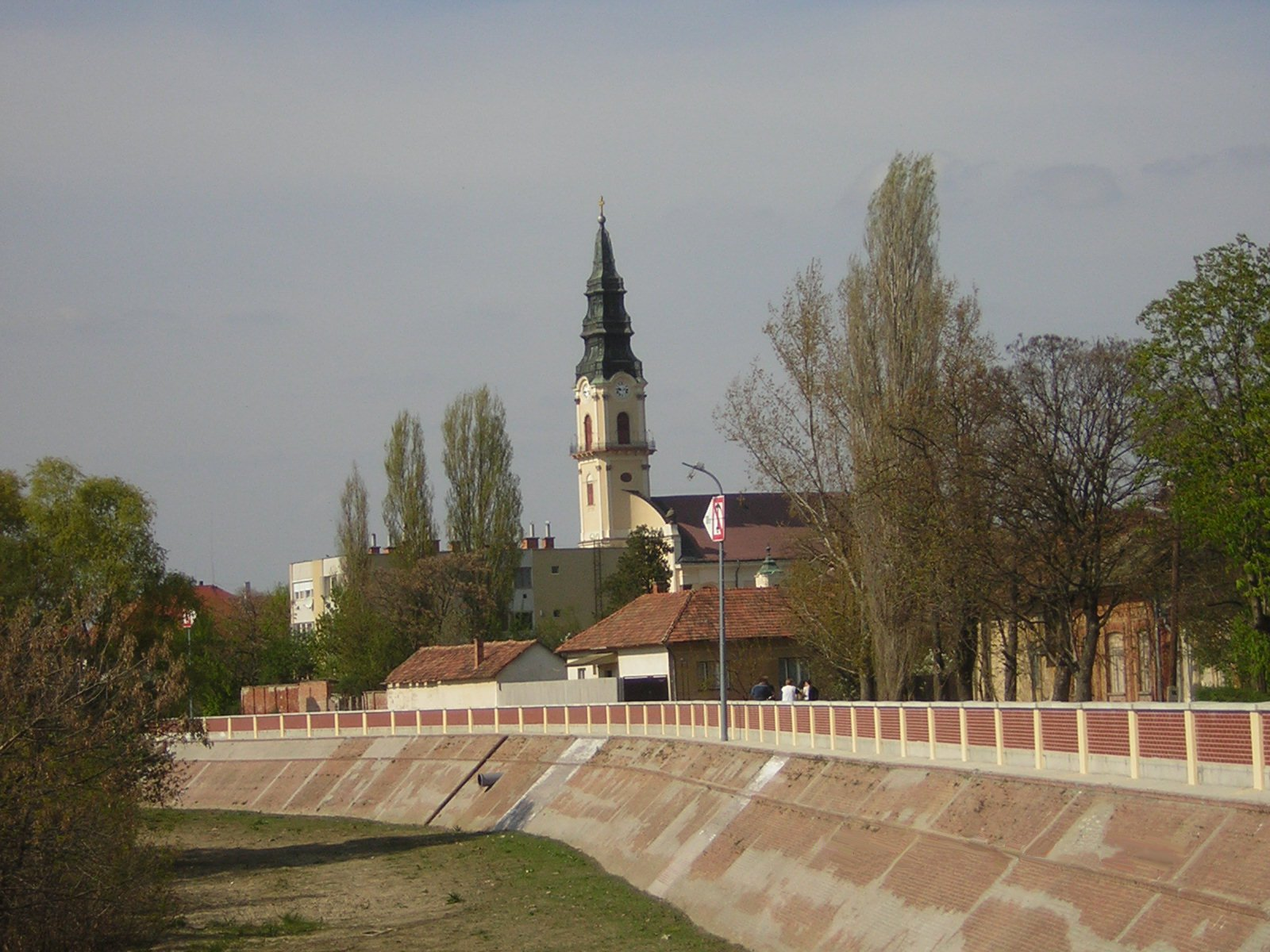
- View of Kunszentmarton's centre with Körös

- Flag Coat of arms

- Location of Kunszentmárton
- Coordinates: 46°50′28″N 20°17′14″E
- Country: Hungary
- County: Jász-Nagykun-Szolnok
- District: Kunszentmárton

Area
  - Total: 143.65 km^{2} (55.46 sq mi)

Population (2006)
  - Total: 8,034
  - Density: 60.34/km^{2} (156.3/sq mi)
- Time zone: UTC+1 (CET)
  - Summer (DST): UTC+2 (CEST)
- Postal code: 5440
- Area code: (+36) 56
- Website: www.kunszentmarton.hu

Kunszentmárton is a small town of the county of Jász-Nagykun-Szolnok, central Hungary.

== Geography ==
Körös River crosses the town from the north-east to the south.

== Twin towns – sister cities ==
Kunszentmárton is twinned with:

- Teterow, Germany

== Sport ==
The local football team is the Kunszentmártoni TE .The team three times Jász-Nagykun-Szolnok county Champion and in 1998–99 season they win the Nemzeti Bajnokság III
