= Gnanalingam =

Gnanalingam is a surname. Notable people with the surname include:

- Brannavan Gnanalingam (born 1983), New Zealand author and lawyer
- G. Gnanalingam (1944–2023), Malaysian businessman
- Ruben Gnanalingam (born 1976), Malaysian businessman
