= Selat Lumut Bridge =

Selat Lumut Bridge Jambatan Selat Lumut
- Carries: Motor vehicles, Pedestrians
- Crosses: Lumut Straits
- Locale: Federal Route 181 Pulau Indah Expressway
- Official name: Selat Lumut Bridge
- Maintained by: Malaysian Public Works Department (JKR) Klang

Characteristics
- Design: Box girder
- Total length: --
- Width: --
- Longest span: --

History
- Designer: Malaysian Public Works Department (JKR)
- Constructed by: Malaysian Public Works Department (JKR)
- Opened: 1994

Selat Lumut Bridge, also known natively as Jambatan Selat Lumut, is the longest straits bridge in Klang Valley, Selangor, Malaysia. It connects mainland Port Klang to Pulau Indah.

== History ==
=== Development ===
Prior to its completion in connecting Port Klang and Pulau Indah in 1994, Pulau Indah had many mangrove swamps, fishing villages, and orang asli inhabitants.

=== Opening ===
Selat Lumut Bridge was opened in 1994.

== See also ==
- Federal Route 181 Pulau Indah Expressway
