= Persiaran PKFZ =

Road in Malaysia

Route information
- Existed: 2002–present
- History: Completed in 2006

Major junctions
- Northeast end: Westports Interchange on FT 181 Pulau Indah Expressway
- FT 181 Pulau Indah Expressway
- Southwest end: Port Klang Free Zone (PKFZ)

Location
- Country: Malaysia

Highway system
- Highways in Malaysia; Expressways; Federal; State

Persiaran PKFZ is a major highway in Selangor, Malaysia. It is the only main route to Port Klang Free Zone (PKFZ).

At most sections, it was built under the JKR R5 road standard, allowing maximum speed limit of up to 90 km/h.

== List of interchanges ==
km	Exit	Interchange	To	Remarks
		Westports Interchange	FT 181 Pulau Indah Expressway; West; Westports Northeast; Port Klang; Southport; Northport; Klang; Shah Alam Expressway Shah Alam Expressway; Shah Alam; Subang Jaya; Petaling Jaya; Kuala Lumpur; Cheras; Ampang; Kuantan	3-tier interchange
FT 181 Pulau Indah Expressway
Persiaran PKFZ
		Jalan Perigi Nenas 7/1 Junctions	east Jalan Perigi Nenas 7/1	T-junctions
		Westports Gate 2 Interchange	South; Westports	Interchange
		Bridge		
Persiaran PKFZ; Start/End of highway JKR border limit
Port Klang Free Zone (PKFZ); Restricted area
		Port Klang Free Zone (PKFZ)		Restricted area
