= Pulau Indah Expressway =

Road in Malaysia

Federal Route 181
- Pulau Indah Expressway
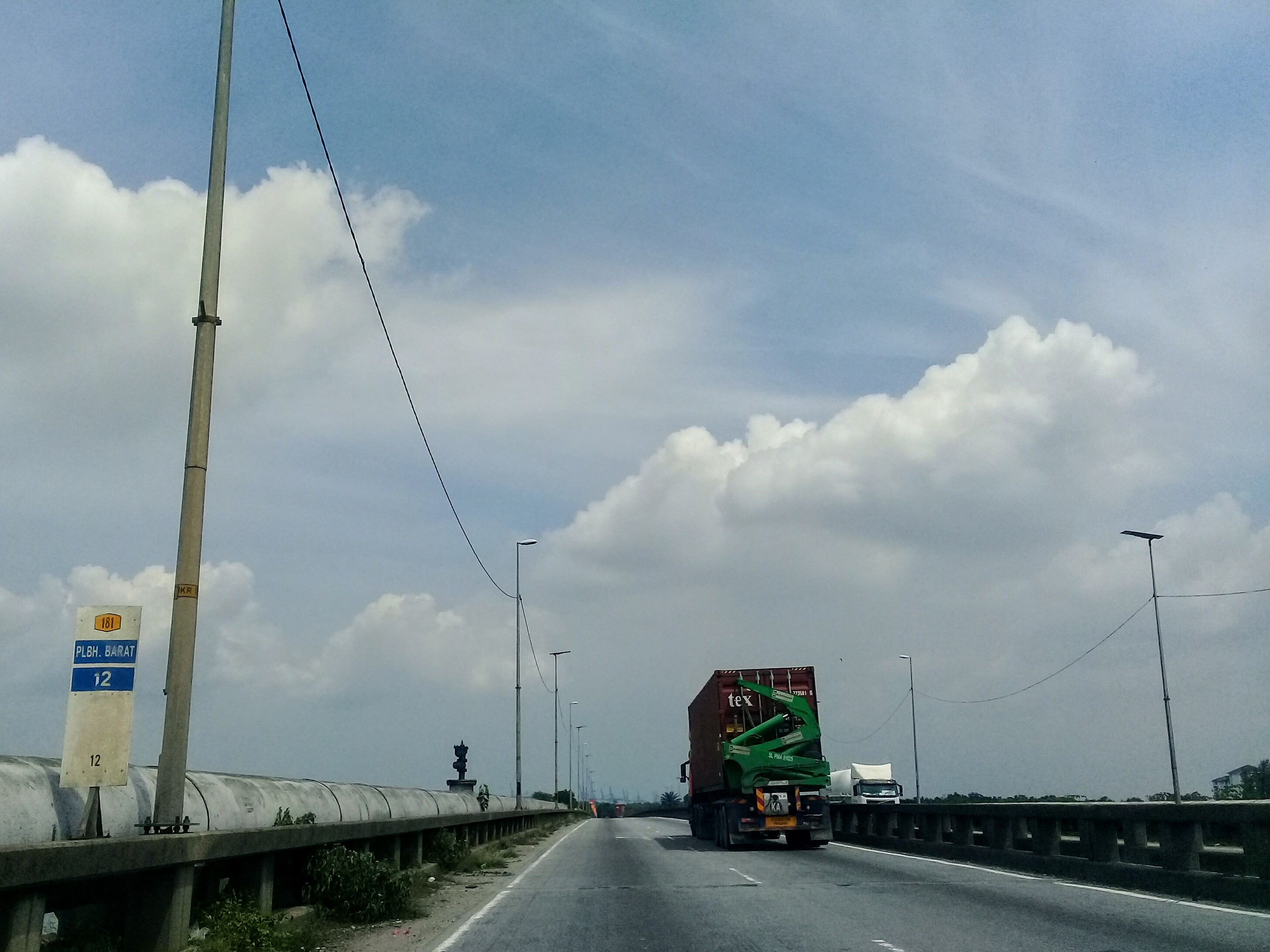

Route information
- Maintained by Malaysian Public Works Department
- Length: 17.70 km (11.00 mi)
- Existed: 1990–present
- History: Completed in 1994

Major junctions
- West end: Westports on Pulau Indah
- Persiaran PKFZ; B121 Jalan Kampung Pulau Lumut; FT 347 Federal Route 347; FT 180 North-South Port Link; B148 Jalan Teluk Gong; FT 3218 Federal Route 3218; Shah Alam Expressway
- East end: Pandamaran

Location
- Country: Malaysia
- Primary destinations: Pulau Indah, Kampung Pulau Lumut

Highway system
- Highways in Malaysia; Expressways; Federal; State

The Pulau Indah Expressway, Federal Route 181, is a countryside highway in Selangor, Malaysia. It connects Pandamaran from Shah Alam Expressway to West Port in Pulau Indah. This 17.7 km (11.0 mi) highway was opened to traffic in 1995, after four years of construction. Pulau Indah Expressway is a four-laned expressway, unlike the wider Shah Alam Expressway which has six lanes. Many cargo trucks travel along the highway daily. There are many accidents in the area along the highway.

The zeroth kilometre of the Federal Route 181 starts at West Port in Pulau Indah.

Selat Lumut Bridge is the longest straits bridge in Klang Valley.

At most sections, the Federal Route 181 was built under the JKR R5 road standard, allowing speed limits of up to 90 km/h (56 mph).

== Junction lists ==
The entire route is located in Klang District, Selangor.

Legend:

- I/C - Interchange, I/S - Intersection, RSA - Rest and service area, OBR - Overhead bridge restaurant, R/R - Restaurant and rest plaza, L/B - Layby, V/P - Vista point, TN - tunnel, T/P - Toll plaza, BR - Bridge
- C - Cloverleaf, S - Stack, T-A - Trumpet-A, T-B - Trumpet-B, DT - Directional-T/Y, SDT - Semi-Directional-T/Y, P-Y - Partial-Y, D - Diamond, P-C - Partial cloverleaf, D-D - Diverging diamond, D-R - Direct ramp

Location	km	mi	Exit	Name	Destinations	Notes
Westports	0.0	0.0		Westports	Westports – Main terminal, Headquarters and control centre, Royal Malaysian Customs Department office	Junctions
Port Klang Free Zone				FFM factory	Federal Flour Mills (FFM) factory	T-junctions
Port Klang Free Zone			Railway crossing			
Port Klang Free Zone			18101	Persiaran PKFZ I/C	Persiaran PKFZ – Port Klang Free Zone (PKFZ)	3-tier interchange
Port Klang Free Zone			Sungai Perigi Nenas Bridge			
Pulau Indah			Pulau Indah R/R			
Pulau Indah			18102	Pulau Indah Industrial Area West I/S	Pulau Indah Industrial Area	T-junctions with railway crossing
Pulau Indah			18103	Pulau Indah Industrial Area East I/S	Pulau Indah Industrial Area – Pulau Indah Recreational Park	T-junctions with railway crossing
Pulau Indah			18104	Selangor Halal Hub I/S	Selangor Halal Hub	T-junctions with railway crossing
Pulau Indah			18105	Jalan Kampung Pulau Lumut I/S	B121 Jalan Kampung Pulau Lumut – Kampung Pulau Lumut	T-junctions
Pulau Indah				Pulau Indah railway stations	Pulau Indah railway stations	
Pulau Indah			18106	Persiaran Pulau Lumut I/C	FT 347 Malaysia Federal Route 347 – Laguna Park; South Klang Valley Expressway – Kajang, Semenyih, Seremban, Putrajaya, Cyberjaya, Banting, Kuala Lumpur International Airport (KLIA), Johor Bahru	Directional-T interchange
Pulau Indah			Sungai Chandong Besar Bridge			
Pulau Indah			18107	Persiaran Pelabuhan Barat I/C	Persiaran Pelabuhan Barat – Pulau Indah Industrial Park, Boustead Cruise terminal, Royal Malaysian Navy (TLDM) National Hydrographic Centre (KD Sultan Abdul Aziz Shah)	Diamond interchange with railway crossing
Pulau Indah				Marine Police and MMEA coast guard base	Marine Police and MMEA coast guard base	
Pulau Indah			Selat Lumut Bridge			
Teluk Gadung			Sungai Sama Gagah Bridge			
Teluk Gadung			18108	Teluk Gedung I/C	FT 180 North-South Port Link – Port Klang, Klang, Kapar, Northport	Trumpet interchange
Teluk Gadung			18109	Jalan Teluk Gong I/C	B148 Jalan Teluk Gong – Kota Pendamar, Teluk Gong, Glenmarie Cove	Interchange
Pandamaran			18110	Pandamaran I/C	FT 3218 Jalan Pandamaran – Kota Pendamar, Taman Pendamar Indah, Kampung Pendamar, Taman Sri Pendamar (Phase 1, 2 and 3), Kota Bayuemas, Taman Pendamar Indah 2, Jalan Johan Setia, Teluk Panglima Garang	Diamond interchange
Pandamaran	18.0	11.2	18111	Cricket Club Exit	Cricket Club	Westbound
Pandamaran			Through to Shah Alam Expressway			
1.000 mi = 1.609 km; 1.000 km = 0.621 mi: Incomplete access; Route transition

== See also ==
- West Port, Malaysia
