= Malaysia Federal Route 347 =

Road in Malaysia

Federal Route 347
- Persiaran Pulau Lumut
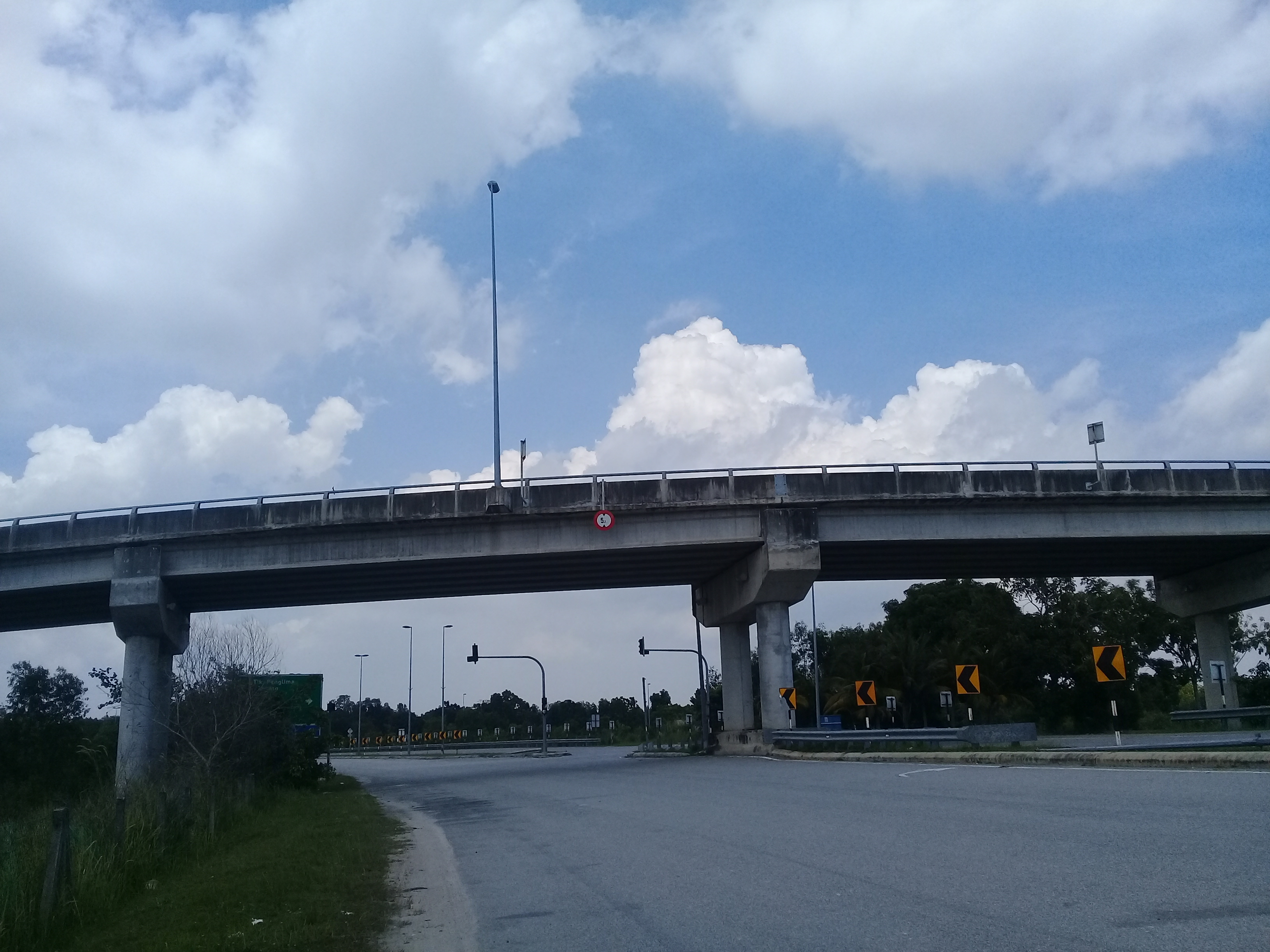

Route information
- Maintained by Malaysian Public Works Department
- Existed: 2010–present
- History: Completed in 2013

Major junctions
- Northeast end: Persiaran Pulau Lumut Interchange on FT181
- FT 181 Pulau Indah Expressway; South Klang Valley Expressway
- Southwest end: Port Klang Free Zone (PKFZ)

Location
- Country: Malaysia

Highway system
- Highways in Malaysia; Expressways; Federal; State

Jalan Lingkaran Pulau Indah or Persiaran Pulau Lumut is a major highway in the Klang Valley region, Malaysia. It is the only main route to South Klang Valley Expressway E26.

At most sections, it was built under the JKR R5 road standard, allowing maximum speed limit of up to 90 km/h.

== Junction lists ==
The entire route is located in Klang District, Selangor.

Legend:

- I/C - Interchange, I/S - Intersection, RSA - Rest and service area, OBR - Overhead bridge restaurant, R/R - Restaurant and rest plaza, L/B - Layby, V/P - Vista point, TN - tunnel, T/P - Toll plaza, BR - Bridge
- C - Cloverleaf, S - Stack, T-A - Trumpet-A, T-B - Trumpet-B, DT - Directional-T/Y, SDT - Semi-Directional-T/Y, P-Y - Partial-Y, D - Diamond, P-C - Partial cloverleaf, D-D - Diverging diamond, D-R - Direct ramp

Location	km	mi	Name	Destinations	Notes
Pulau Indah			Persiaran Pulau Indah I/C	FT 181 Pulau Indah Expressway – Westports, Port Klang, Southport, Northport, Klang; Shah Alam Expressway – Shah Alam, Subang Jaya, Petaling Jaya, Kuala Lumpur, Cheras, Ampang, Kuantan	Directional-T interchange
Pulau Indah			Kampung Orang Asli Pulau Lumut		
Pulau Indah			Taman Samudera		
Pulau Indah			Kampung Orang Asli Pulau Lumut		
Pulau Indah			Kampung Pulau Lumut		
Pulau Indah			Pulau Indah-SKVE I/C	South Klang Valley Expressway – Banting, Cyberjaya, Putrajaya, Semenyih, Kajang, Kuala Lumpur International Airport (KLIA), Seremban, Johor Bahru	Directional-T interchange
Pulau Indah			Port Klang Free Zone (PKFZ)		Restricted area
1.000 mi = 1.609 km; 1.000 km = 0.621 mi: Incomplete access
