= North–South Port Link =

Road in Malaysia

Federal Route 180
- North–South Port Link

Route information
- Maintained by Malaysian Public Works Department
- Length: 4.40 km (2.73 mi)
- Existed: 1995–present
- History: Completed in 1997

Major junctions
- West end: FT 103 Northport Highway
- FT 103 Northport Highway; Jalan Kem; FT 181 Pulau Indah Expressway
- East end: Teluk Gedong

Location
- Country: Malaysia
- Primary destinations: Southpoint; Port Klang; Klang; Northport

Highway system
- Highways in Malaysia; Expressways; Federal; State

North–South Port Link, or Jalan Kem and Jalan Pelabuhan Utara-Barat, Federal Route 180, is an expressway in Klang District, Selangor, Malaysia. It connects Northport Highway (Federal Route 103) in Port Klang to Teluk Gedong near Pandamaran. The Kilometre Zero of the Federal Route 180 starts at Port Klang.

== Features ==
At most sections, the Federal Route 180 was built under the JKR R5 road standard, allowing maximum speed limit of up to 90 km/h.

=== Port Klang flyover ===
The Port Klang flyover above Jalan Kem was supposed to make driving between Westport and Northport faster and more convenient, but it has instead become a danger to motorists. The two-kilometre flyover has been stripped of its metal barriers at the side. Should an accident occur, chances are the vehicles involved would fall onto the road below. And there is a high probability of an accident happening, especially at night, as most of the street lights on the flyover are not working. Motorists have expressed concern over the danger posed by the missing barriers and the non-functioning lights as many lorries used the flyover. There is also no emergency lane on the flyover and in the event of a breakdown, an accident could easily happen, especially at night. The Malaysian Public Works Department (JKR) was responsible for maintaining the flyover and the Majlis Perbandaran Klang (Klang Municipal Council) (MPKlg) had written to them asking for repair works to be carried out. But the department replied that there was not enough funds to carry out repairs on the flyover.

=== Railway crossing bridge ===
Construction of a bridge to replace the level crossing and extend the Port Klang flyover started in 2013 and was completed in 2015.

== Junction lists ==
The entire route is located in Klang District, Selangor.

Legend:

- I/C - Interchange, I/S - Intersection, RSA - Rest and service area, OBR - Overhead bridge restaurant, R/R - Restaurant and rest plaza, L/B - Layby, V/P - Vista point, TN - tunnel, T/P - Toll plaza, BR - Bridge
- C - Cloverleaf, S - Stack, T-A - Trumpet-A, T-B - Trumpet-B, DT - Directional-T/Y, SDT - Semi-Directional-T/Y, P-Y - Partial-Y, D - Diamond, P-C - Partial cloverleaf, D-D - Diverging diamond, D-R - Direct ramp

Location	km	mi	Exit	Name	Destinations	Notes
Port Klang Flyover (3 km)			Through to FT 103 Northport Highway			
Port Klang Flyover (3 km)				Port Klang flyover	FT 103 Northport Highway – Port Klang town centre, Southpoint; FT 2 Persiaran Raja Muda Musa – Klang, Kuala Lumpur	Start/End of flyover Ramp on/off
Port Klang Flyover (3 km)			Railway crossing bridge			
Port Klang Flyover (3 km)			Railway crossing bridge			
Port Klang Flyover (3 km)	0.0	0.0		Port Klang	Below Flyover – Southpoint, Port Klang Komuter station, Port Klang Ferry Terminal (to Pulau Ketam and International terminal to Dumai and Tanjungbalai (Indonesia)); FT 2 Persiaran Raja Muda Musa – Klang, Kuala Lumpur	Junctions on the below flyover only
Port Klang Flyover (3 km)				Southpoint	Below Flyover – Southpoint, Southpoint Container Terminal	Junctions on the below flyover only
Port Klang Flyover (3 km)				Jalan Kem I/C	Jalan Kem – Southpoint, Port Klang town centre FT 2 Persiaran Raja Muda Musa – Klang, Kuala Lumpur	Ramp from/to Teluk Gedong
Port Klang Flyover (3 km)			Sungai Aur bridge			
Teluk Gedung			Shell L/B (southbound)			
Teluk Gedung				Taman Teluk Gedung Indah	Jalan Sungai Sama Gagah 21 – Taman Teluk Gedung Indah	T-junctions
Teluk Gedung	4.0	2.5	–			
Teluk Gedung	4.4	2.7		Teluk Gedong I/C	FT 181 Pulau Indah Expressway – Pulau Indah, Westport, Pandamaran; Shah Alam Expressway – Banting, Shah Alam, Subang Jaya, Sri Petaling, Kuala Lumpur International Airport (KLIA), Johor Bahru	Trumpet interchange
1.000 mi = 1.609 km; 1.000 km = 0.621 mi: Route transition
