= Southpoint, Malaysia =

Port in Selangor, Malaysia

Coordinates: 2.9962094°N 101.3962812°E

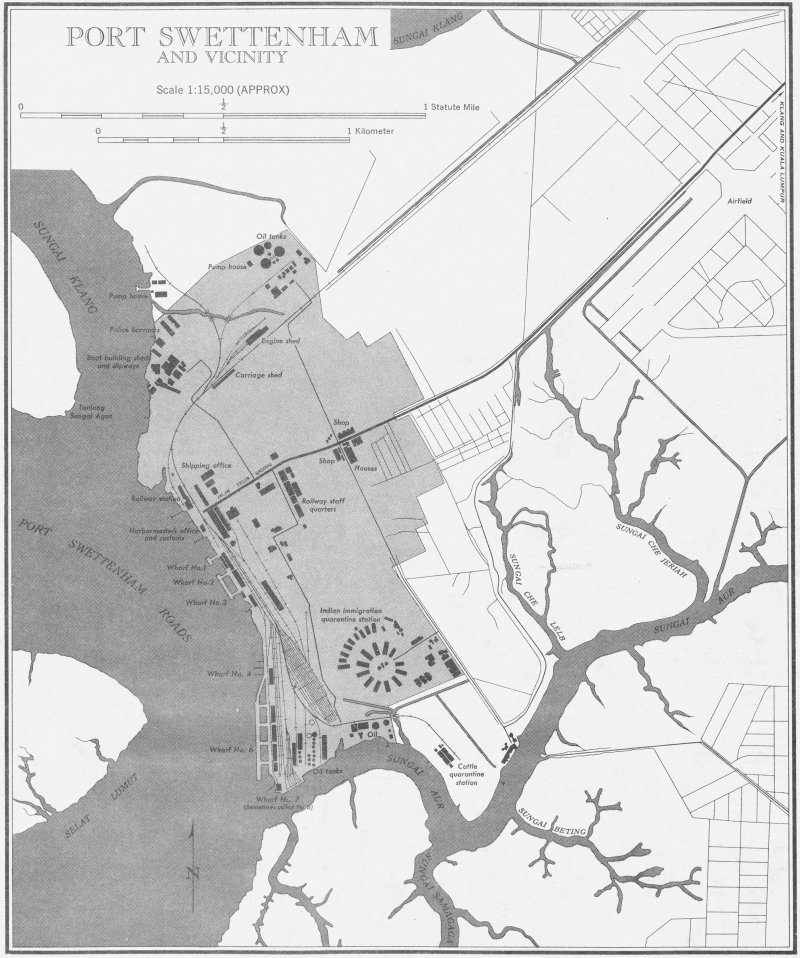
Map of Port Swettenham in 1954. This area is now known as Southpoint.

Southpoint, Malaysia is a port in Klang District, Selangor, Malaysia. Called Port Swettenham under British rule, it was the only port in the area and was administered by Malayan Railways Limited. Today Southpoint has undergone massive rehabilitation and offers a range of facilities and services for the handling of a variety of cargoes; it is now one of three ports in the area (see Port Klang and Northport), and has been administered by the Port Klang Authority since 1963.

== History ==
The history of Port Klang (now the most important port in Malaysia) began more than 100 years ago at Southpoint, then a small railway port that was known as Port Swettenham. For many years it was the national gateway, offering a wide range of port facilities and services and handling all cargo types such as general, breakbulk and liquid bulk.

The demand for port facilities at Port Klang, consistent with the growth of the economy in the seventies, and the advent of containerization, saw the development of Northport eclipsing the role of Southpoint. Southpoint became a home only to small coastal ships, tugs, barges, fishing crafts and inter-island ferries.

The Selangor Polo Club was founded in Port Swettenham in 1902 but it moved to Kuala Lumpur in 1911.

Major efforts have now been initiated by Northport ( Malaysia) Bhd, which owns and operates Southport, to revitalize the port. Southpoint is rapidly emerging into a regional conventional transshipment hub.

== The Port Today ==
Southpoint caters to ships serving the short-sea trades in the region. It also has facilities for the handling of liquid bulk cargo, especially palm oil and rubber latex, as well as dry bulk cargo. Southpoint also handles cargo such as vehicles and machineries.

Designated as a 'Free Commercial Zone' in February 2004, Southpoint offers itself as a customs-free cargo consolidation centre for re-shipment of cargoes shipped in conventional form from neighbouring and riverine ports.

Southpoint has eight berths (from Berth 1 to Berth 7A). The first four berths have a depth between 9 m and 10.5 m to cater for ocean-going vessels up to 40,000 displacement tonnes. Berths 5 to 7A draw depths of about 6m and can accommodate coastal ships of up to 6,000 displacement tonnes.

Other facilities include: eight warehouses, a container yard and a fully equipped multipurpose yard with a total space of 35,000 sq.metres that serves as freight station for consolidation of conventional cargo into containers. Containers from Southpoint can be moved across to the container terminals at Northport to secure mainline connections to worldwide ports.

Significant upgrading and refurbishing of the facilities and services have been carried to meet the demands of the trade. Since the port facility at Southpoint has traditionally served as a coastal terminal to handle the trade between Peninsular Malaysia and Sabah/Sarawak, a major focus of the re-development of the terminal is to serve the short-sea trade.

There are now a number of ship operators and barges mounting regular services to and from river ports in Indonesia, Sabah, Sarawak, Thailand, Myanmar and Vietnam.

Southpoint has an average of 120 barge ship calls per month. In addition, Southpoint has five break bulk berths. The 546 meter terminal is capable of accommodating bulkers ranging from 6,000 tonnes deadweight (DWT) to 20,000 DWT.

There are regular sailings to more than 11 major ports in Indonesia: Banjarmasin, Belawan, Jambi, Makasar, Palembang, Dumai, Bitung, Tanjung Balai, Pekan Baru, Buatanand Semarang. Cargo handling consolidation activities are also expected to link up with more than 20 minor ports around the Indonesian archipelago.

Southpoint also offers dedicated facilities for containerized cargo, which can be packed, unpacked and stored, for distribution via Northport's Container Terminal 1, 2 and 3 for worldwide connections.

Southpoint is positioned to play a niche role in the expanding intra-ASEAN trade, especially to exploit the "trade creation" effects following the entry of AFTA.

== See also ==
- Port Klang Free Zone
