= Gnanalingam Gunanathlingam =

Malaysian businessman (1944–2023)

Yang Berbahagia Tan Sri Datuk Gnanalingam Gunanathlingam PSM PJN
- ஜ்ஞாநலிங்கம் குணநாதலிங்கம்
- Born: 10 September 1944; Japanese-occupied Singapore
- Died: 11 July 2023 (aged 78)
- Occupations: Businessman, professional sports promoter
- Known for: The development of West Port, Malaysia
- Spouse: Puan Sri Siew Yong Gnanalingam
- Children: 3, Datuk Ruben Emir Abdullah, Shaline Gnanalingam, and Surin Gnanalingam
- Awards: Tan Sri

Gnanalingam Gunanathlingam (Tamil:‌‌ ஜ்ஞாநலிங்கம் குணநாதலிங்கம்; 10 September 1944 – 11 July 2023) was a Malaysian businessman. He was the executive chairman of West Port, Malaysia, one of Malaysia's leading port operators.

The Singapore-born captain of industry, who grew up in Port Dickson and Kuala Pilah, was of Sri Lankan Tamil ancestry. He joined the privately held port in 1994 and was instrumental in steering the port into a leading cargo and freight player in Asia.

== Career ==
=== Ports ===
Initiated into the world of transport with his appointment to the Board Member of Port Klang Authority in 1987.

Gnanalingam founded Kelang Multi Terminal Sdn Bhd (now known as Westports Malaysia Sdn Bhd) in 1994. He became the Executive Chairman in 1996 when Malaysia's first green-field port was privatized. He made it become Malaysia's largest privately owned port.

Gnanalingam adopted “flexi-port & fast-port” approaches in advocating changes and defying conventional practices to cargo and ship handling, including by implementing integrated port charges,” the citation read.

Gnanalingam was also cited for “de-mystifying” the general perception of the industry by the public, making ports more public-friendly creating public awareness and adopting the “garden port concept” making Westport probably the only such port in the world.

Gnanalingam was credited with introducing innovative measures to win traffic during the 1997/98 financial crisis that saw Port Klang achieving positive growth as well as fostering feeding to Westport.

=== Professional sports ===
A marketing director with British American Tobacco, he was the man behind such projects as bringing live telecasts of football's World Cup to Malaysian homes in the 80s.

He was also responsible, during a nine-year period as a consultant for commercial operations for RTM, of increasing its revenue from RM55 million in 1988 to RM350 million in 1996.

It was in 1989 that Tan Sri Gnanalingam made his mark in Malaysian sports when, as a marketing consultant, he turned the Kuala Lumpur Sea Games into a money-making event. The Olympic Council of Malaysia Building, built at a cost of RM6 million at that time, stands testimony to its success.

== Other interests and personal life ==
Gnanalingam also owned a stake in pencilmaker Pelikan and logistics firm Konsortium Logistiks.

He was married to Puan Sri Siew Yong Gnanalingam. They had 3 children; Ruben Emir, Shaline and Surin. Gnanalingam was said to be making way for son Ruben to eventually take over the managing of his business enterprise, with his two other children joining later.

Gnanalingam died on 11 July 2023, at the age of 78.

== Recognition ==
- Commander of the Order of Loyalty to the Crown of Malaysia (PSM) – Tan Sri (2000)
- Commander of the Order of Meritorious Service (PJN) – Datuk (1997)
