= American Association of Individual Investors =

Nonprofit membership organization

- Company type: Non-profit
- Genre: Investment
- Founded: 1978
- Founder: Dr. James Cloonan, PhD
- Headquarters: Chicago, United States
- Key people: John Bajkowski (president)
- Website: http://www.aaii.com

The American Association of Individual Investors is a nonprofit organization with about 150,000 members whose purpose is to educate individual investors regarding stock market portfolios, financial planning, and retirement accounts. AAII "assists individuals in becoming effective managers of their own assets through programs of education, information and research." The organization markets itself as an unbiased source of investment information because of its not-for-profit status.

The organization was founded in 1978 by James Cloonan, Ph.D. Over the last thirty years, AAII's members report "investment returns that are consistently higher than those of the stock market as a whole" (using the S&P 500 as reference). Since 2003, AAII has maintained two real portfolios—a shadow stock portfolio and a mutual fund portfolio for education purposes. These portfolios' returns and contents are available online and, the site reports, have outperformed the market considerably over the course of their existence.

== Membership ==
AAII.com is the organization's main outlet for their educational materials. While it does offer some completely free information, requiring no registration or membership dues, a large portion of the site requires free registration or membership. AAII's best and premium content is made available only to members, who pay fees starting at $29 a year. For this fee, they receive the AAII Journal (the organization's monthly ad-free magazine), access to the organization's model portfolios, techniques for screening stocks, free investment courses, and other benefits. For members interested in using their computers as an investment resource, AAII offers the Computerized Investing journal and microsite for an additional annual fee. AAII also offers members the opportunity to attend its annual investor conference for an additional fee, featuring notable speakers from across the finance space.

== Mentions ==
- Syndicated columnist Humberto Cruz has mentioned AAII in his investment advice columns; he wrote, "For my money, I prefer AAII. But BetterInvesting may appeal to those interested in forming investment clubs, and several people I know belong to both organizations."
- AAII.com has earned a "Best of the Web" award from Forbes in 2012.
- AAII's "Sentiment Survey", which is a weekly poll (indicator) of its members' opinion on where the market will be in six months, is often written about by financial bloggers and other personal investment organizations, who consider the survey to be among the best of contrarian indicators.
- AAII.com was mentioned in a June 2006 Newsweek article: "If you want more-technical information, try the American Association of Individual Investors".
- AAII.com was treated more critically by Johnathan Ping in his Mymoneyblog, which not only details the 2009 revenue to salary and marketing costs of the organization, but argues that the performance claims of the AAII portfolios are not entirely honest.

== See also ==
- Investing
- Financial education
- Non-profit
- Value Line
- Morningstar, Inc.
