= Port Klang Authority =

Statuary board of the government of Malaysia

Port Klang Authority (PKA)
- Lembaga Pelabuhan Klang

Agency overview
- Formed: 1 July 1963; 63 years ago
- Preceding agency: Malayan Railway Administration
- Jurisdiction: Government of Malaysia
- Headquarters: Jalan Pelabuhan Utara, 42005 Pelabuhan Klang, Selangor, Malaysia.
- Minister responsible: Anthony Loke Siew Fook, Minister of Transport
- Agency executives: Ean Yong Hian Wah, Chairman; Capt. K. Subramaniam, General Manager
- Parent ministry: Ministry of Transport
- Website: pka.gov.my

Port Klang Authority (PKA) is a government agency of Malaysia that facilitates, regulates and owns the country's most important port, Port Klang, on the Indian Ocean coast near the capital, Kuala Lumpur. The operation of the port facilities is carried out by independent corporations.

== History ==
Port Klang Authority was established on 1 July 1963, taking over the administration of Port Klang from the Malayan Railway Administration. In 1986, in line with Malaysian government privatisation guidelines the privatisation of the PKA began with the divestment of container terminal activities to a private company, Klang Container Terminal Berhad. In 1992, the remainder of the port's operations were divested to Klang Port Management Berhad and in 1994, new facilities on Pulau Lumut Island were divested to Kelang Multi Terminal Sendirian Berhad which is now known as Westports Malaysia Sdn Bhd. 2000 saw the founding of Northport, Malaysia, a large port facility at Port Klang. The port currently consists of 3 principal areas: Northport, Westports Malaysia and South Point. Further expansion is planned.

The Port Klang Authority regulates the activities of the port operator companies, and functions as the landlord of the port.

=== Free Commercial Zone ===
In 1993, the government of Malaysia created the Port Klang Free Zone. As a result, manufacturing activities are prohibited at the port area, and process optimization of port procedures including duty free regulatory structures was established, increasing the overall economic attractiveness of the port.

== See also ==
- Free port
- Port Klang
- Port authority
- Port operator
- Klang Valley
- Penang Port Commission
