= Ruben Gnanalingam =

Malaysian businessman (born 1976)

Yang Berbahagia Dato' Seri Ruben Gnanalingam SPMS PMW
- Born: Ruben Emir Nepo Ki D' Gnanalingam; 16 September 1976 (age 50)
- Education: Victoria Institution
- Alma mater: London School of Economics
- Occupations: CEO; Westports Malaysia; Co-chairman; Queens Park Rangers F.C.
- Board member of: Westports Malaysia; Kuala Lumpur Business Club Malaysia
- Spouse: Shirieene Hajamaideen (m. 2006)
- Parent(s): G. Gnanalingam; Siew Yong Gnanalingam

Ruben Emir Gnanalingam Abdullah (born 16 September 1976) is a Malaysian businessman.

== Early life ==
Gnanalingam was born on 16 September 1976. He graduated from the London School of Economics with a Bachelor of Science (Honours) Economics.

== Westports Malaysia ==
Gnanalingam joined Westports Malaysia in 2005, and was the Executive Director from 2006 to 2010. He then moved into the role of Chief Executive Officer (CEO), a position which, as of 2015, he still holds.

== Queens Park Rangers F.C. ==
In 2015, he was named as co-chairman of Queens Park Rangers F.C., alongside Tony Fernandes. On 15 August 2018, he and Tony Fernandes stepped down from co-chairmen to enable Amit Bhatia to take their spaces and become chairman.

== Los Angeles F.C. ==
In 2019, Gnanalingam joined the ownership group of Major League Soccer's Los Angeles FC.

== Central Coast Mariners F.C. ==
On 23 June 2026, the Australian Professional Leagues (APL) announced that ownership of Central Coast Mariners FC had been transferred to Total Soccer Growth Holdings (TSG), an international investment group led by Malaysian businessman Ruben Gnanalingam. The acquisition followed a period of league administration after the APL assumed control of the club in January 2026, following the forfeiture of the club’s participation agreement by previous owner Mike Charlesworth.

Gnanalingam, who is the majority shareholder of TSG, stated that the group viewed Australian football as a significant growth opportunity and expressed a commitment to strengthening the club’s connection with the Central Coast community and its youth development pathways.

The acquisition returned the Mariners to private ownership after approximately five months under APL administration. The transaction did not include the club’s A-League Women licence.

== Other work ==
Gnanalingam is as of 2015 a board member at Kuala Lumpur Business Club Malaysia.

== Personal life ==
Gnanalingam is a Malaysian of Sri Lankan Tamil and Chinese descent. His father is G. Gnanalingam, another prominent businessman, and his mother is Siew Yong Gnanalingam. As of 2015, he is married to Shirieene Hajamaideen.

In early 2025, Gnanalingam issued a statement in which he apologized for reposting several articles on LinkedIn that were widely criticized as anti-Israeli. His remarks drew criticism from Queens Park Rangers, Los Angeles FC, and Major League Soccer. He stated, 'It was never my intention to offend or harm anyone, and I take responsibility for not exercising greater caution before sharing these posts.'"

== Honours ==
=== Honours of Malaysia ===
- Federal Territory (Malaysia)
  - Commander of the Order of the Territorial Crown (PMW) – Datuk (2018)
- Selangor
  - Knight Grand Commander of the Order of the Crown of Selangor (SPMS) – Dato' Seri (2026)
  - Recipient of the Sultan Sharafuddin Silver Jubilee Medal (2026)
