= Pulau Indah Industrial Park =

Pulau Indah Industrial Park (PIIP) located in Klang District, Selangor, Malaysia is 3,500 acres industrial area which are occupied by business like manufacturing, logistics and warehousing.
