= Shadow stock =

Shadow stock can mean several different things.

One meaning is a stock of an already-listed company which has the same or similar industry as a new-listed company. Since the stock price of new-listed companies mostly boosts up after being listed in a stock market, shadow stocks may also boost up to cope with the trend. However, as the increase in shadow stock price is irrelevant to the performance of the companies themselves, the stock price may drop again after such increasing power fades.

Another is a virtual "stock" which is merely a calculated value that a company uses internally to motivate and compensate employees. The calculation strips out the fluctuation that would occur for a real stock due to the general market, and is set using only fundamental analysis of the company's financial performance.

Another is a type of stock that passes a certain stock screening method developed by the American Association of Individual Investors. In this sense, the stock is supposedly undervalued because it is "in the shadows" as far as professional investors are concerned. To pass the screen, the stock must be in the bottom decile of market capitalization, have a price to book value ratio in the bottom decile, and meet other criteria.

Shadow stock can also refer to holdings of physical stock which fall outside official reporting channels, for example the London Metal Exchange has reported on global shadow stocks of aluminium and copper which are held by businesses outside of official reporting regimes.
