= Port Klang =

Port Klang Pelabuhan Klang
- Town
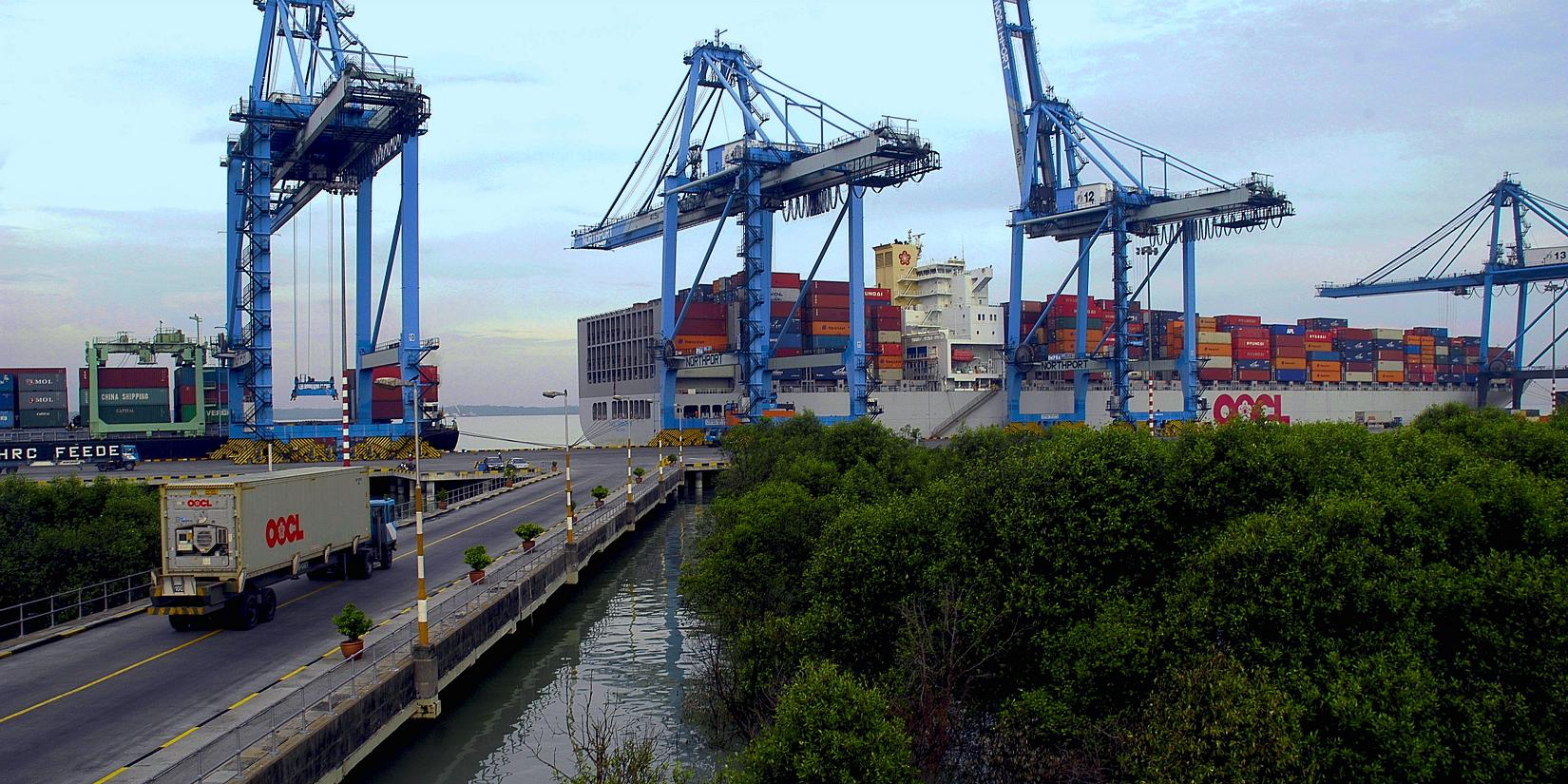

- Location within Malaysia
- Coordinates: 3°0′0″N 101°24′0″E
- Country: Malaysia
- State: Selangor
- District: Klang
- Established: 15 September 1901

Government
  - Municipal Council: Klang Royal City Council
  - Local Authority: Port Klang Authority

Area
  - Total: 573 km^{2} (221 sq mi)
- Time zone: UTC+8 (MST)
- Postcode: 42000
- Dialling code: +60 3
- Vehicle registration: B
- Police: Port Klang, Pulau Ketam and Pandamaran
- Fire: Northport, Port Klang
- Website: http://www.pka.gov.my

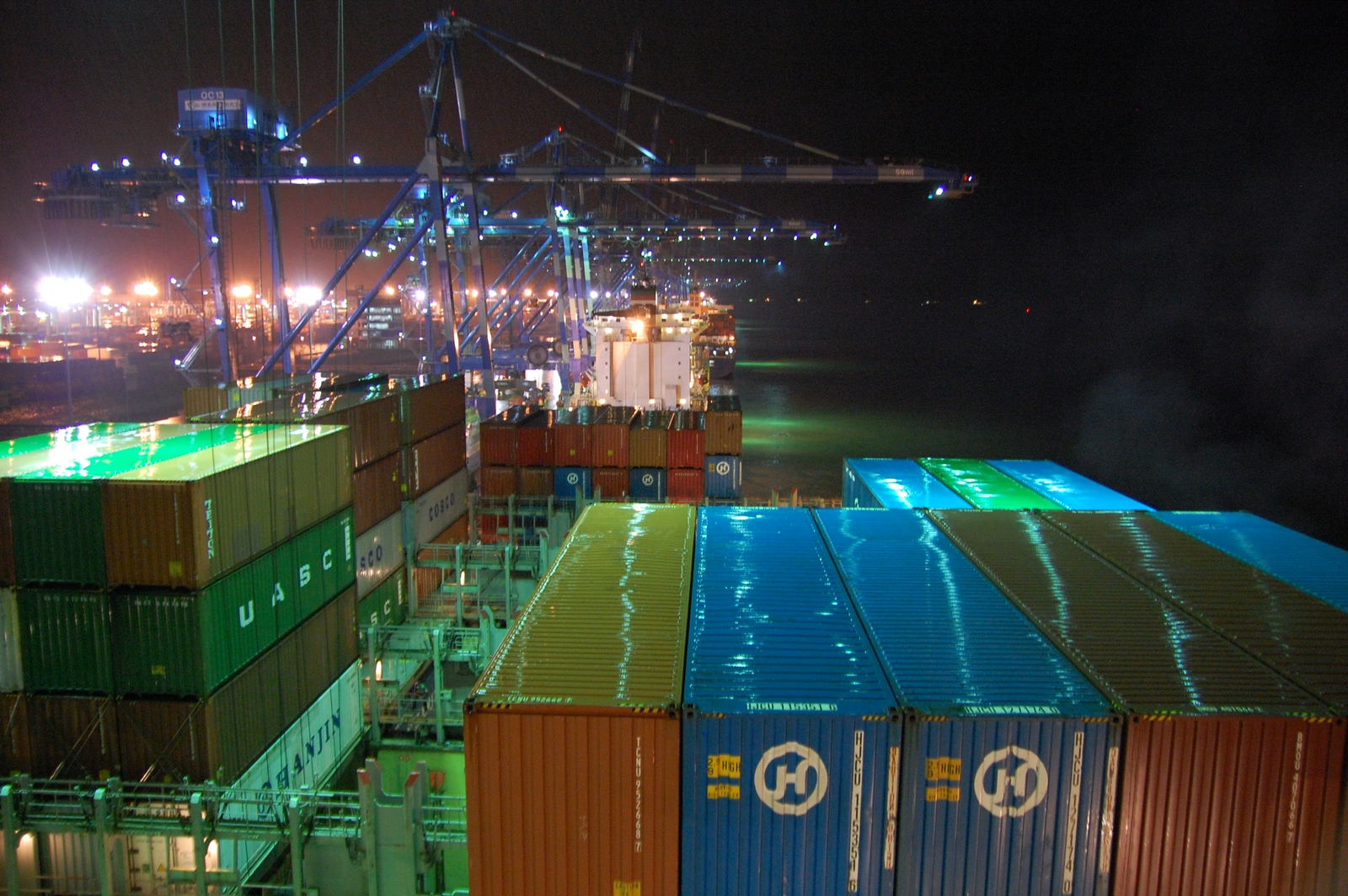
Port of Port Klang

Port Klang (Malay: Pelabuhan Klang) is the principal port of Malaysia on the Strait of Malacca. Known during colonial times as Port Swettenham (Malay: Pelabuhan Swettenham), it was renamed Port Klang in July 1972 and has since become the largest port in the country. It is located about 6 kilometres (3.7 mi) southwest of the town of Klang, and 38 kilometres (24 mi) southwest of Kuala Lumpur.

Port Klang was also known as the "National Load Centre".

Located in the District of Klang, it was the 14th busiest container port (2022) in the world. It was also the 12th busiest port in by volume (million TEU) in 2018 and as of July 2020 was the top location for aluminium stockholding for LME, the top metal exchange in the world.

== History ==
Klang was formerly the terminus of the government railway and the port of the State. In 1880, the state capital of Selangor was moved from Klang to the more strategically advantageous Kuala Lumpur. Rapid development at the new administrative centre in the late 1800s attracted businessmen and job seekers alike from Klang. At this time the only methods of transport between Klang and Kuala Lumpur were by horse or buffalo drawn wagons, or boat ride along the Klang River to Damansara. Due to this Frank Swettenham stated to Selangor's British Resident at the time, William Bloomfield Douglas, that the journey to Kuala Lumpur was "rather long and boring". He continued to suggest a train line be built as an alternative route.

In September 1882, Sir Frank Athelstane Swettenham was appointed Selangor's new Resident. Swettenham initiated a rail link between Klang and Kuala Lumpur to overcome the transport problems, particularly of the tin mining interests who needed to convey the ore to Klang's port, Pelabuhan Batu. Nineteen and a half miles of rail track from Kuala Lumpur to Bukit Kudu was opened in September 1886, and extended 3 miles to Klang in 1890. River navigation, however, was difficult, as only ships drawing less than 3.9 metres (13 ft) of water could come up the jetty, and thus a new port was selected near the mouth of the river as the anchorage was good. Developed by the Malayan Railway and officially opened 15 years later on 15 September 1901 by Swettenham himself, the new port was named Port Swettenham.

=== British control ===
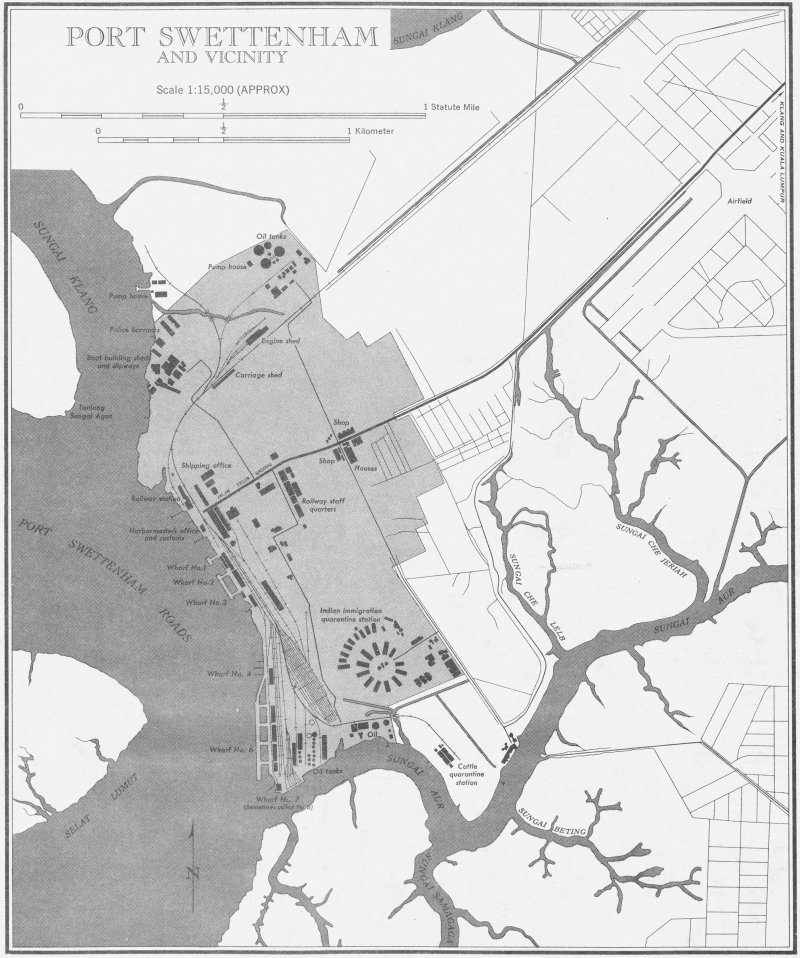
Map of Port Swettenham in 1954. This area is now known as Southpoint.

Both Klang and Port Swettenham were already known as notoriously malaria prone localities with the port itself located on a mangrove swamp. Within two months of its opening, the port was closed due to an outbreak of malaria. Just a few years before, the British doctor Sir Ronald Ross had proved in 1897 that malaria is transmitted by mosquitoes; Port Swettenham was the first colonial area to benefit from the discovery. Swamps were filled in, jungle cleared, and surface water diverted to destroy mosquito breeding grounds and combat further disruption to port operations. The threat of malaria was removed completely by the end of the exercise. Trade grew rapidly and two new berths were added by 1914 along with other port facilities. The Selangor Polo Club was founded in Port Swettenham in 1902 but it moved to Kuala Lumpur in 1911.

Between World Wars I and II, the port experienced much growth and expansion, peaking in 1940 when tonnage rose to 550,000 tonnes. During the Second World War Allied aircraft were serviced by RAF Servicing Commandos at airfields in Port Swettenham. Its location is marked on a 1954 map by the United States Army. Much of the port's facilities that were damaged during the war were reconstructed. The port expanded to the south with permanent installations to handle more palm oil and latex, two increasingly important exports. Imports also grew tremendously, and tonnage of cargo handled at the port far exceeded what was thought possible before the war.

=== Post-independence ===
On 1 July 1963, the Malaysian government established the Port Swettenham Authority, which was subsequently changed to Port Klang Authority, as a statutory corporation to take over the administration of Port Klang from the Malayan Railway Administration. In the late 1960s and 1970s new deepwater berths were constructed with wharves suitable for handling container as well as conventional cargoes. The Royal Selangor Yacht Club was first registered here as "Port Swettenham Yacht Club" in July 1969. In November 1972, Prime Minister Tun Abdul Razak declared the container terminal open and in May 1974, construction of seven more berths for bulk cargo began and was completed in 1983. In October 1982, construction of the liquid bulk terminal in North Port was completed.

On 17 March 1986, the container terminal facilities operated by Port Klang Authority was privatised to Klang Container Terminal Berhad as part of the privatisation exercise of the government. In January 1988, construction work began on a new 800 feet (240 m) berth, as an alternative to the immediate development of West Port. A government directive in 1993 has identified Port Klang to be developed into the National Load Centre. Port Klang has since grown and now establishes trade connections with over 120 countries and dealings with more than 500 ports around the world.

The port is part of the Maritime Silk Road that runs from the Chinese coast via the Suez Canal to the Mediterranean, there to the Upper Adriatic region of Trieste with its connections to Central and Eastern Europe.

As of July 2020, Port Klang was the top location for aluminium stockholding for LME, the top metal exchange in the world. LME reported that the port had "taken centre stage in the LME aluminium storage wars over the last couple of years": 911,000 tonnes or registered stock and 434,000 tonnes of shadow stocks were held there at the end of May 2020.

== Infrastructure ==
=== Terminals ===
==== South Port ====
South Port (South Point) has a wharf with 8 berths. Berths are identified by English numerals and alphabets, which may range from English numerals 1 to 7A with English alphabets. There are three types of cargo unloading and loading facilities at the wharf, namely liquid cargo, bulk cargo and breakbulk cargo. The wharf has infrastructure for handling liquid cargoes at berths 1 and 2, bulk cargoes at berth 3 and breakbulk cargoes at remaining berths. According to the design and structure, Berths No-1 and No-2 are capable of handling vessels up to 40,000 DWT, Berth No-3 of 23,000 DWT, Berth No-4 of 20,000 DWT, and Berth No-5, No-6, No-7, and No-7A are of 6,000 DWT.

=== Anchorages ===
The port has two types of anchorage within the port limits, outer anchorage and inner anchorage. There is one outer anchorage each seaward of the South Channel and the North Channel, which are identified as Outer Anchorage South Channel and Outer Anchorage North Channel. The Outer Anchorage South Channel lies in the Pintu Gedong area to the east and southeast of the South Fairway Buoy, where ships anchor awaiting berthing instructions, and also for ship to ship transfer (STS) activities. However, anchoring of vessels within 1 nautical mile (1.9 km) radius of the South Fairway Buoy is prohibited. On the other hand, The Outer Anchorage North Channel is the recommended anchorage for vessels waiting for pilots about 0.5 nautical miles (0.93 km) before the pilot boarding ground, where the water depths is 15–22 metres (49–72 ft).

Four designated anchorages are available within the Inner Harbour, namely the deep water points North, South and Reserve, and the Northshore Anchorage. Each anchorage has restrictions on vessel types including maximum length and maximum draft allowed. Among them, the deep water point North has a maximum draft depth allowed, which is not more than 10 metres (33 ft), and is capable of anchoring ships of a maximum length of 200 metres (660 ft). The deep water point South and Reserved anchorages have a draft of 8 metres (26 ft), and the maximum permitted length of vessels is 180 meters and 120 metres respectively. The Northshore Anchorage has a minimum draft of 4 metres, which can accommodate vessels up to 90 metres. Coastal vessels other than tankers are permitted to anchor in this anchorage.

=== Navigational channels ===
The Port of Port Klang has two entrances or navigational channels from the sea, Pulau Angsa (North) Channel and Pintu Gedong (South) Channel; whereas the Pulau Angsa Channel is used for Northport bound and Southport bound vessels, and the Pintu Gedong Channel for West Port bound vessels. But the Gedong Channel is deeper than the Pulau Angsa Channel, so the Westport is able to handle larger ships than the Northport.

Depth of water in the channel
Condition and value of depth		Channels	
Condition	Value	Pulau Angsa (North)	Pintu Gedong (South)
Natural depth	Dredged	11.3 metres (37 ft)	18 metres (59 ft)
Tidal depth	Minimum	13.3 metres (44 ft)	20 metres (66 ft)
Tidal depth	Maximum	16.3 metres (53 ft)	23.5 metres (77 ft)

The 11 nautical mile long Pulau Angasa channel to Northport has a depth of 11.3 meters and a minimum width of 365 meters. The channel is connected to a 4.5 nautical mile long fairway in front of Northport. The fairway has a depth of 15 meters up to berth No-15 and the section in front of berth No-15 to No-21 has a depth of 13 meters. The approach channel to South Port starts at the southern end of this fairway, and is 2.6 nautical miles long and has a minimum width of 210 meters. The depth of this approach channel is 7.5 meters. Vessels with a maximum draft of 15 meters are able to navigate through the Pulau Angasa Channel with tidal support.

Pintu Gedong channel is 2.3 nautical miles long up to Westport, and has a depth of 18 meters and a minimum width of 500 meters. The channel depth increases between 2 meters and 5.5 meters with tidal support; as a result, ships with a maximum draft of 17.5 meters are able to navigate.

== Local governance ==
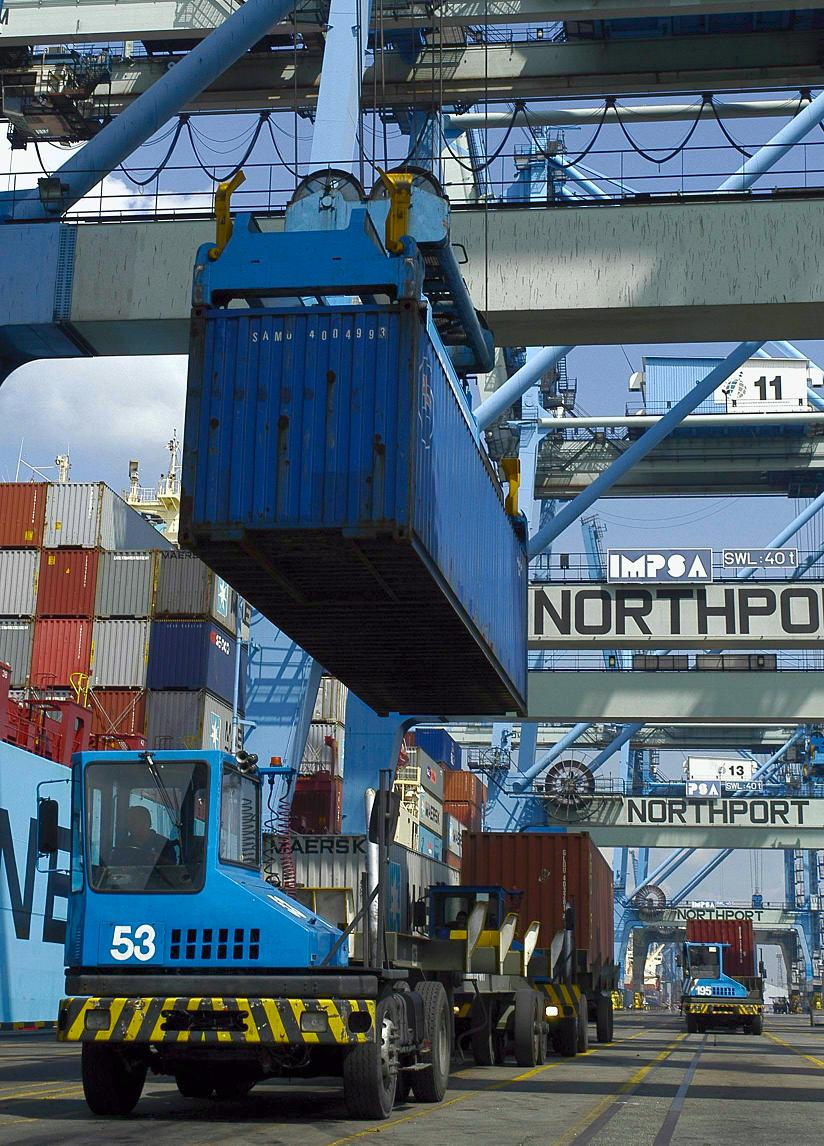
A container being loaded on a prime mover in Northport.

=== Port Klang Authority ===
The Port Klang Authority administers three ports in the Port Klang area namely Northport, Southpoint and Westport. Prior to the establishment of the Port Klang Authority, South Port was the only existing port and was administered by the Malayan Railway Administration. Both Westport and Northport have been privatized and managed as separate entities.

The total capacity of the port is 109,700,000 tons of cargo in 2005 compared to 550,000 tons in 1940.

=== Port operators ===
==== Northport ====
Northport is owned and operated by Northport (Malaysia) Bhd and comprises dedicated multipurpose port facilities and services. The Northport entity was a merger of two companies – Kelang Container Terminal (KCT) and Kelang Port Management (KPM). Its operations also cover South Port, which was renamed Southpoint for conventional cargo handling, and acquired Northport Distripark Sdn Bhd (NDSB) as part of its logistics division.

==== Westport ====
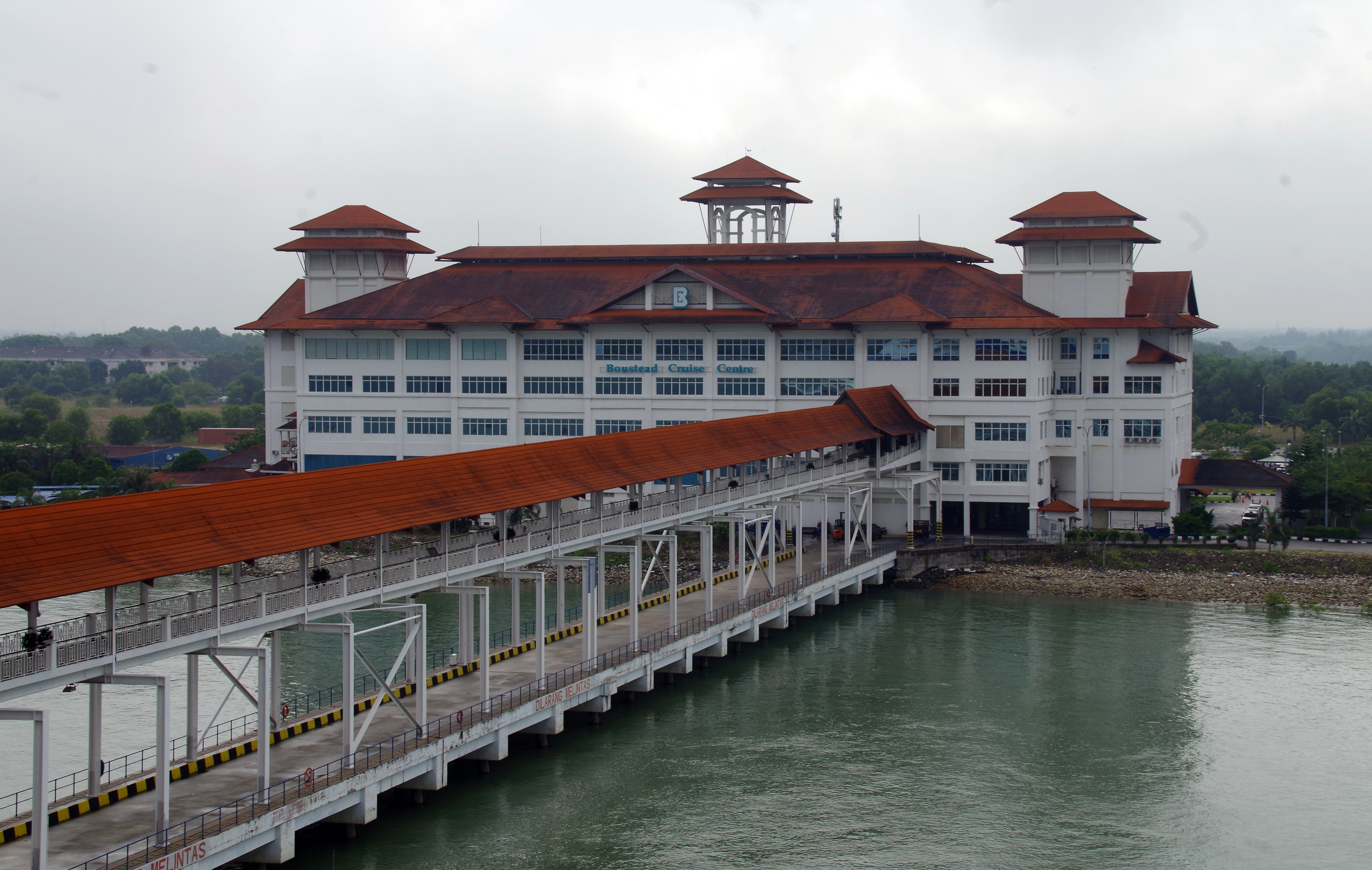
Port Klang Cruise Centre

Westport is managed by Westports Malaysia Sdn Bhd (formerly known as Kelang Multi Terminal Sdn Bhd). A passenger port, Port Klang Cruise Centre, opened in December 1995 at Pulau Indah which is located next to the cargo terminals of Westport. Cruise line and naval ships drop anchor in any of the three berths at Port Klang Cruise Centre, which was under the management of Star Cruises before being taken over by the Glenn Marine Group.

== Accessibility ==
=== Car ===
Port Klang is the western end of the Federal Highway Federal Route 2 that links it all the way to Kuala Lumpur. The KESAS interchanges with the Pulau Indah Expressway Federal Route 181 in nearby Pandamaran connects to Westports and the PKFZ.

Main roads that link the Port Klang town, Southport and housing area are Persiaran Raja Muda Musa and Jalan Pelabuhan Utara.

Since 2012, Pulau Indah is directly connected to Malaysia's administrative capital, Putrajaya and Kajang via the SKVE.

=== Public transportation ===
There is a frequent bus and commuter train service to Kuala Lumpur via Klang.

Port Klang is served by the KTM Komuter service and trains stop at the Port Klang Komuter station. The electric train service links to Klang, Kuala Lumpur, Subang Jaya, Shah Alam and all the way until Tanjung Malim.

A passenger ferry terminal to Pulau Ketam and an International terminal to Tanjungbalai and Dumai in Indonesia are also located in the area. The old ferry terminal used to serve regular passenger boats to Pulau Lumut and Telok Gonjeng terminal until the completion of Northport Bridge link.

=== Air ===
An airstrip (3°0′36″N 101°24′30″E) was built in the area in 1937 for the RAF and operated until 1966. It is now a school.

== Politics ==
Port Klang is under the jurisdiction of the Royal City of Klang Municipal Council (MBDK). It is represented in the Dewan Rakyat, the lower house of Parliament, by the MP for Klang, Ganabatirau Veraman. In the State Assembly of Selangor, the township is represented by Azmizam Zaman Huri, the state assemblyman for Pelabuhan Klang.

== Image gallery ==
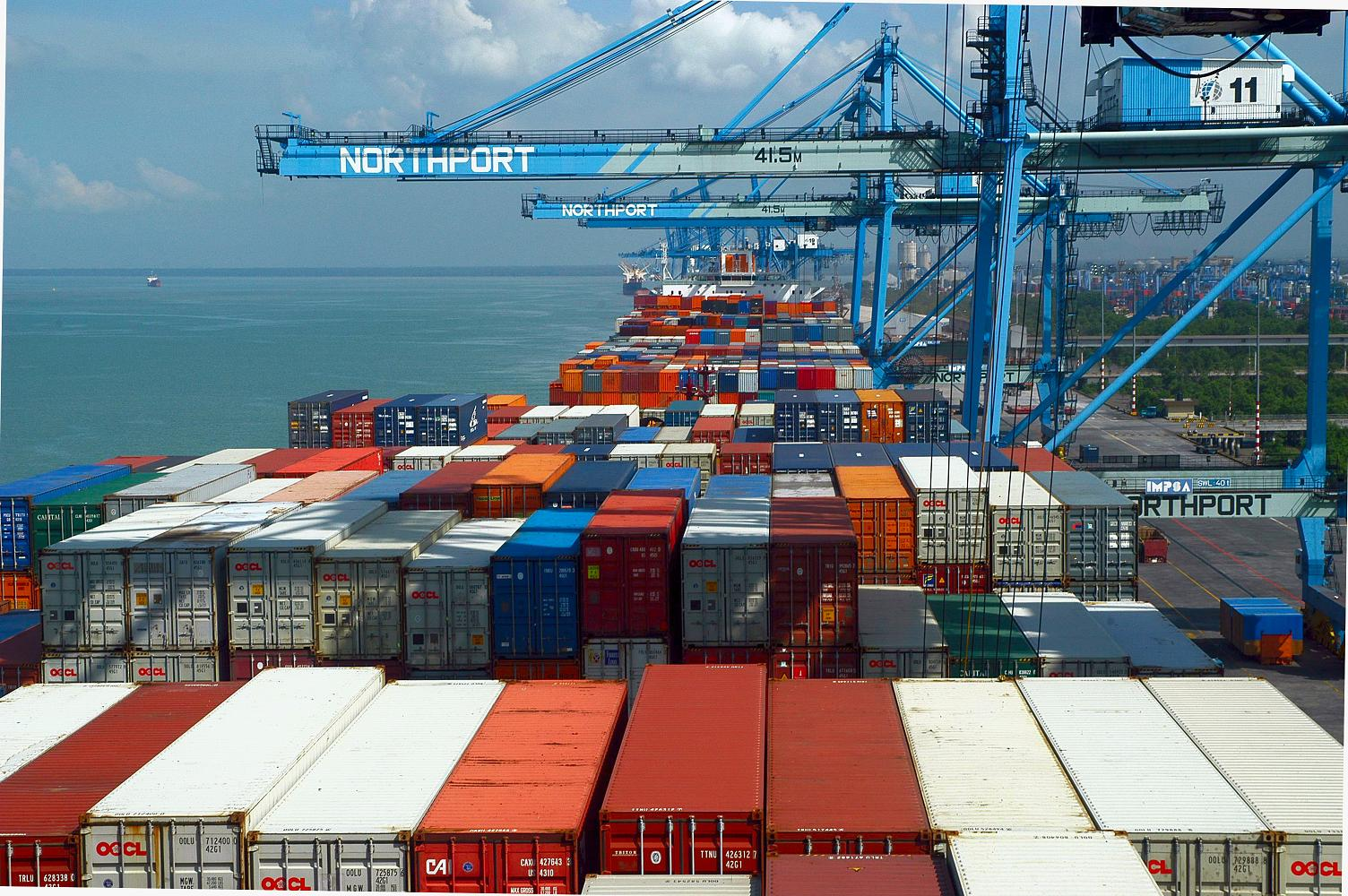
Quay cranes in Northport

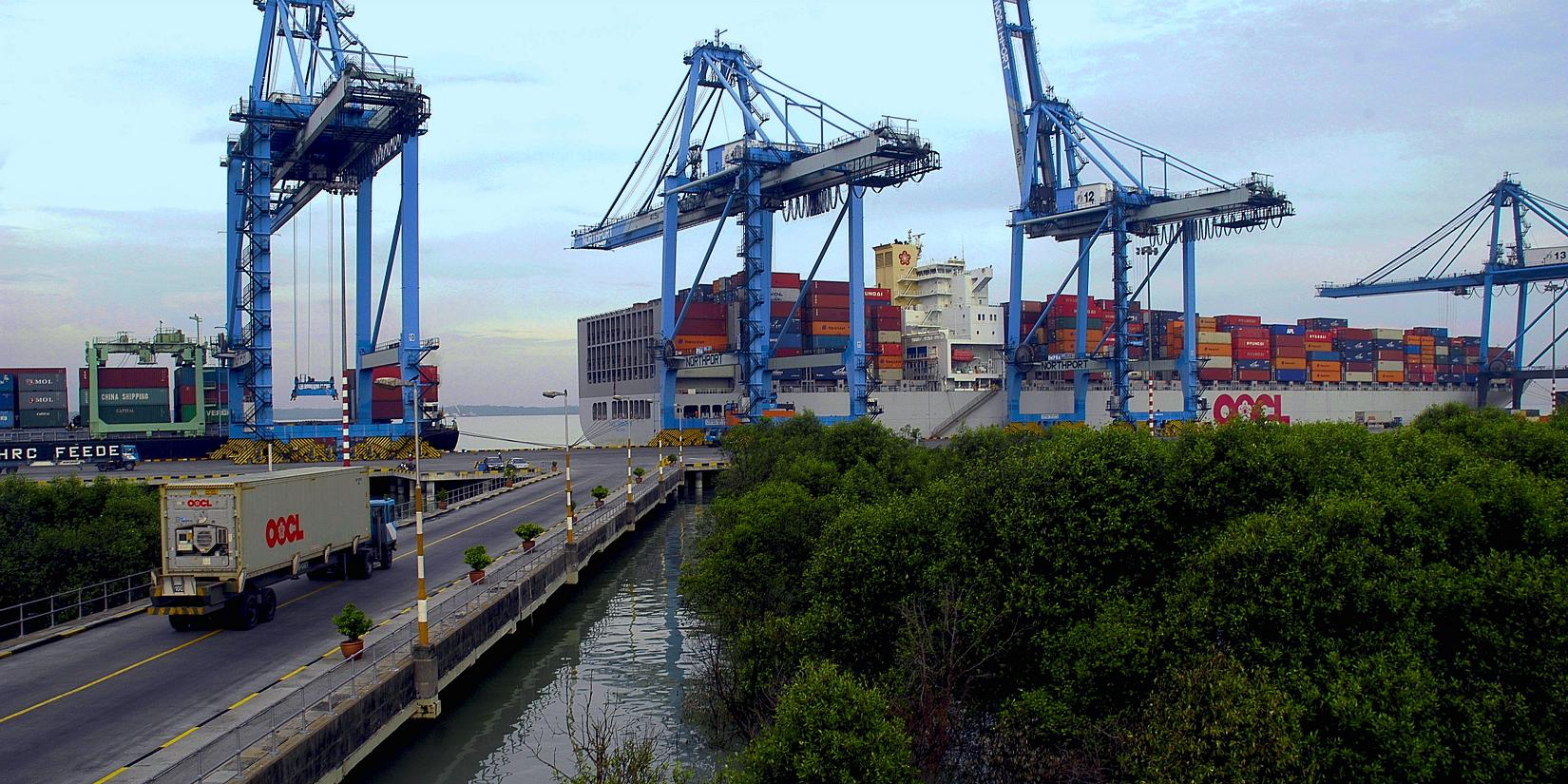
Another view of the Northport docks

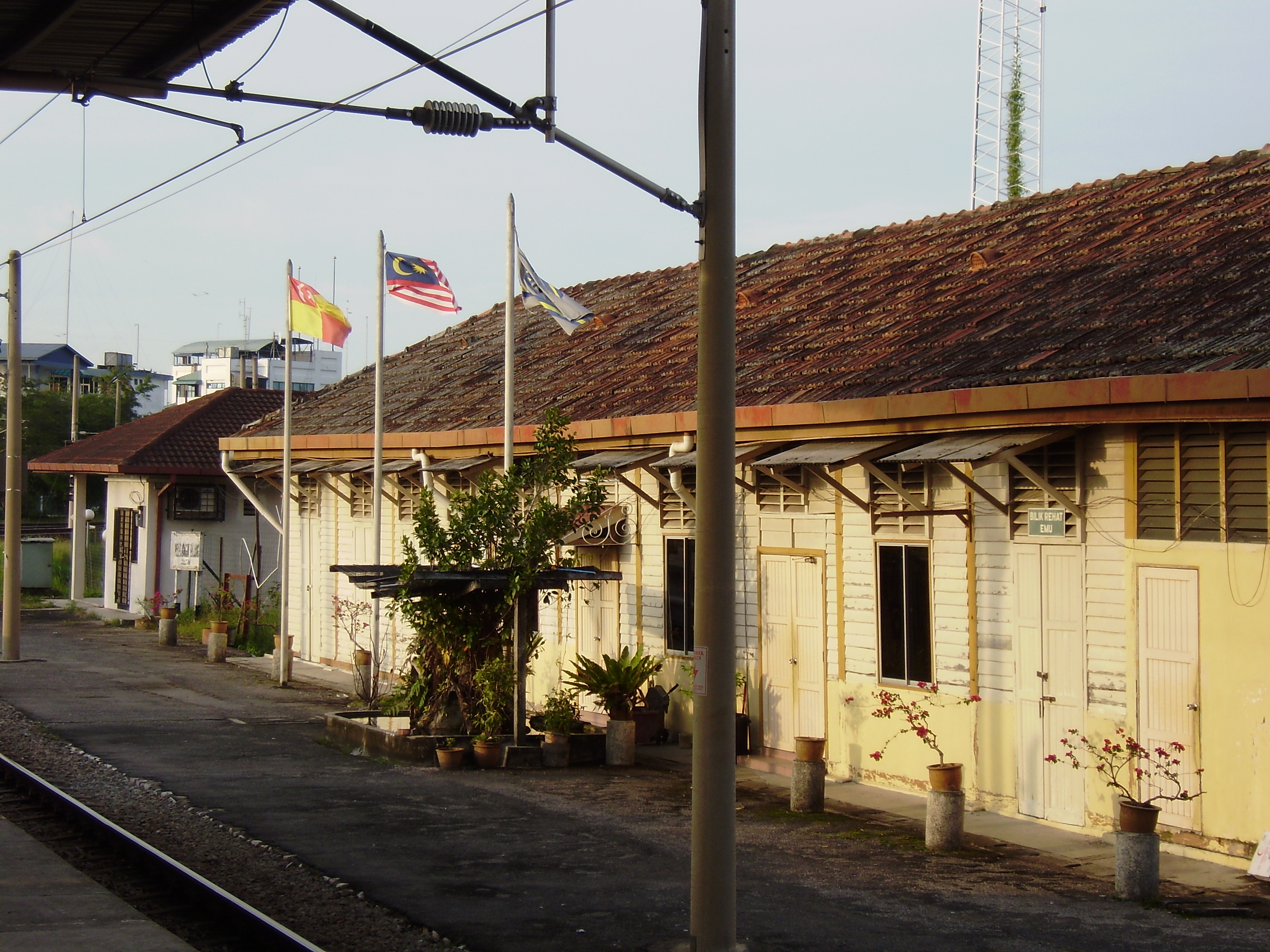
Port Klang Komuter station offices

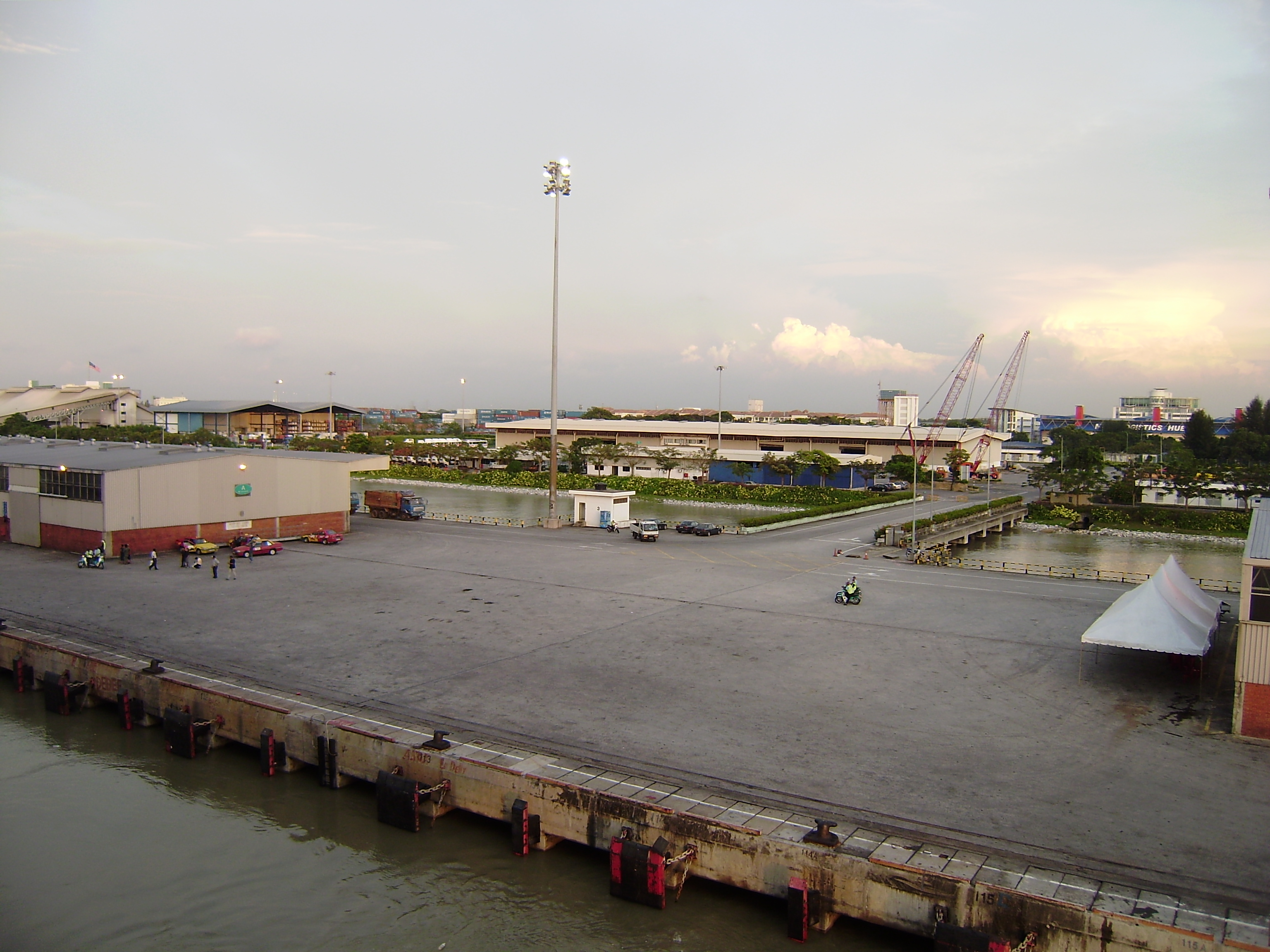
A terminal on Westport viewed from a ship

Aerial view of Northport's container terminal

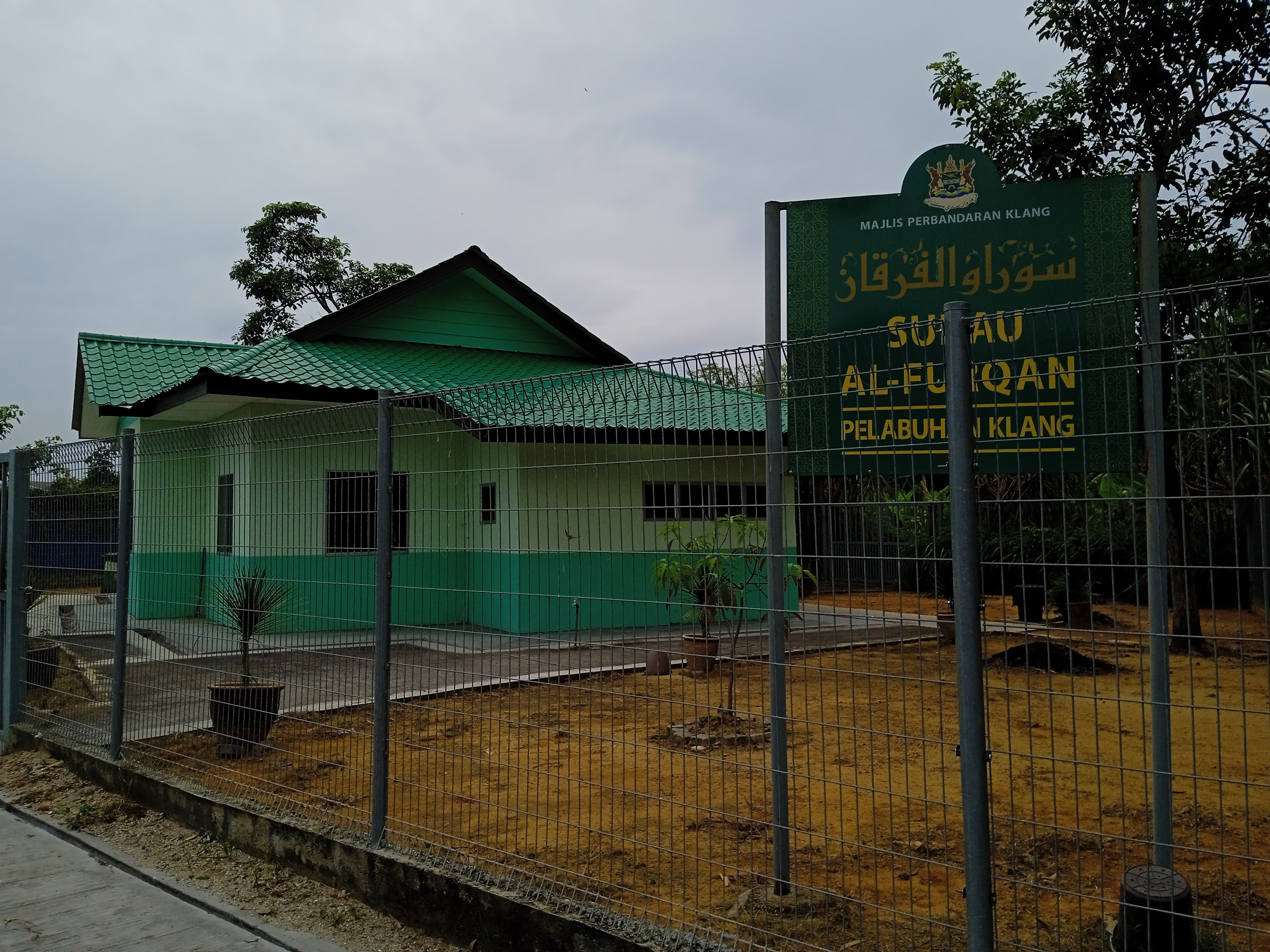
Surau Al-Furqan in Port Klang

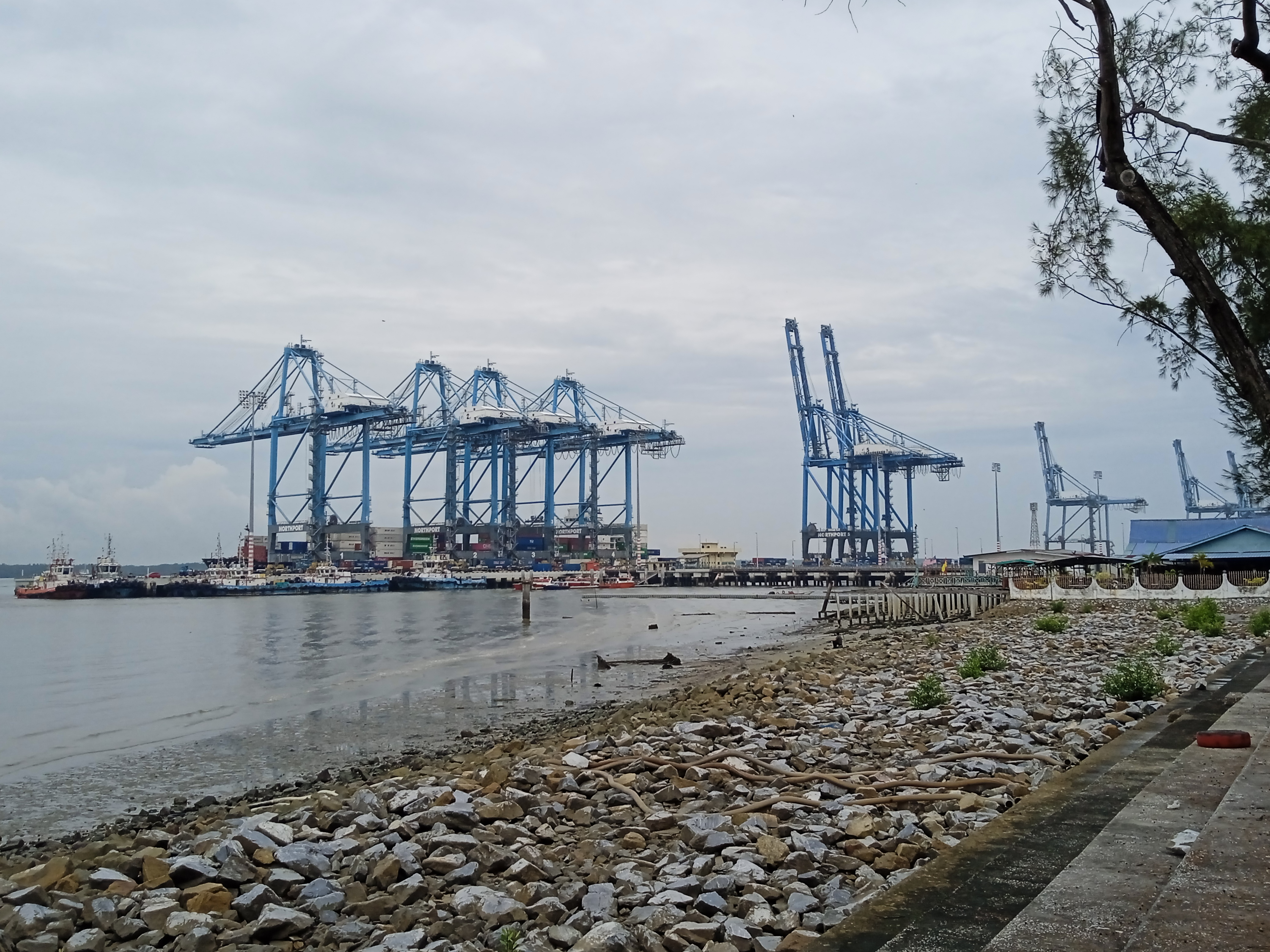
Northport view from Tanjung Harapan, Port Klang

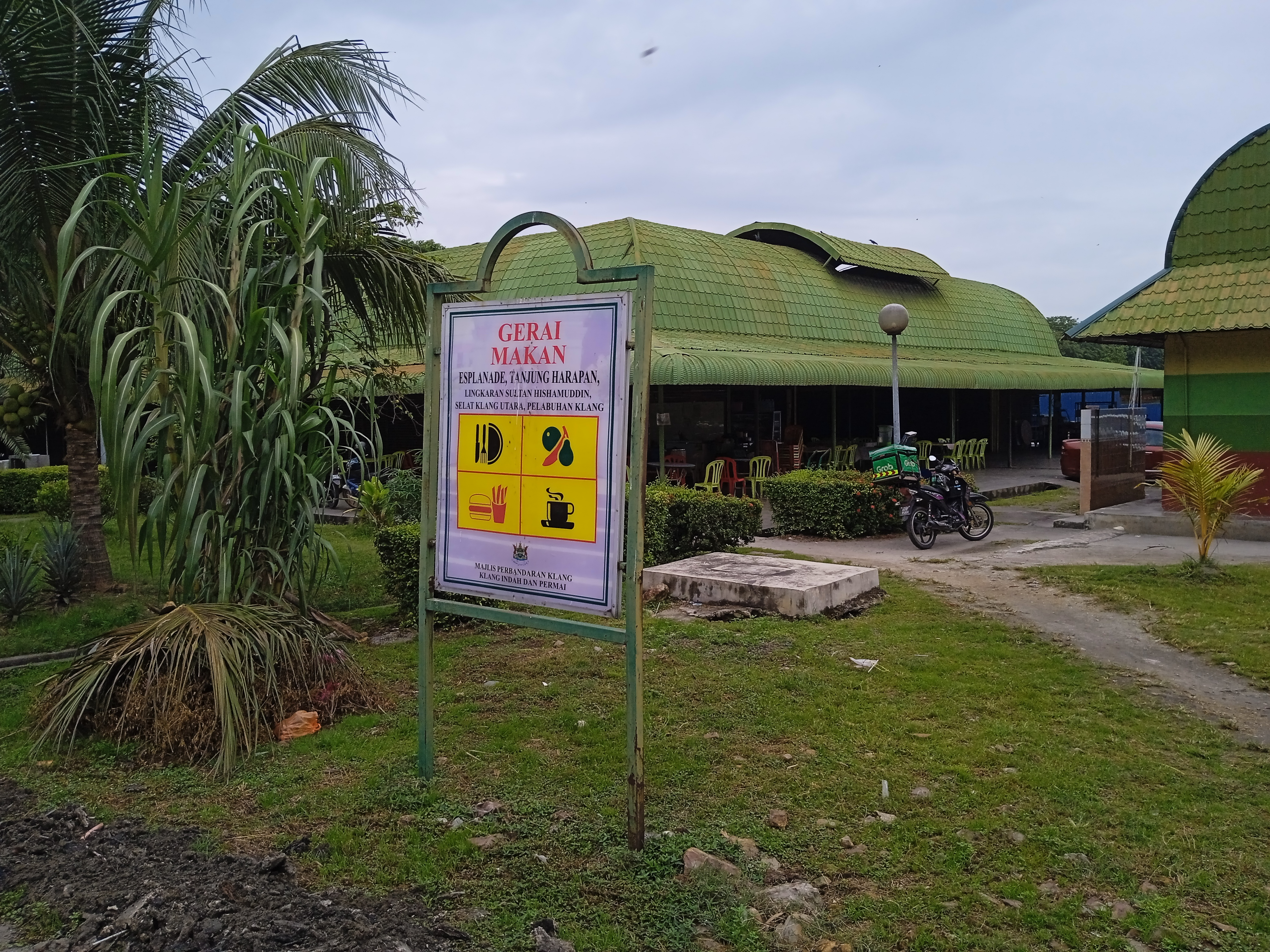
Esplanade Tanjung Harapan, Port Klang

== See also ==
- Container transport
- List of East Asian ports
- Operation Zipper
- Port Klang Free Zone
- List of deepest natural harbours
