= Pulau Indah =

Island in Selangor, Malaysia

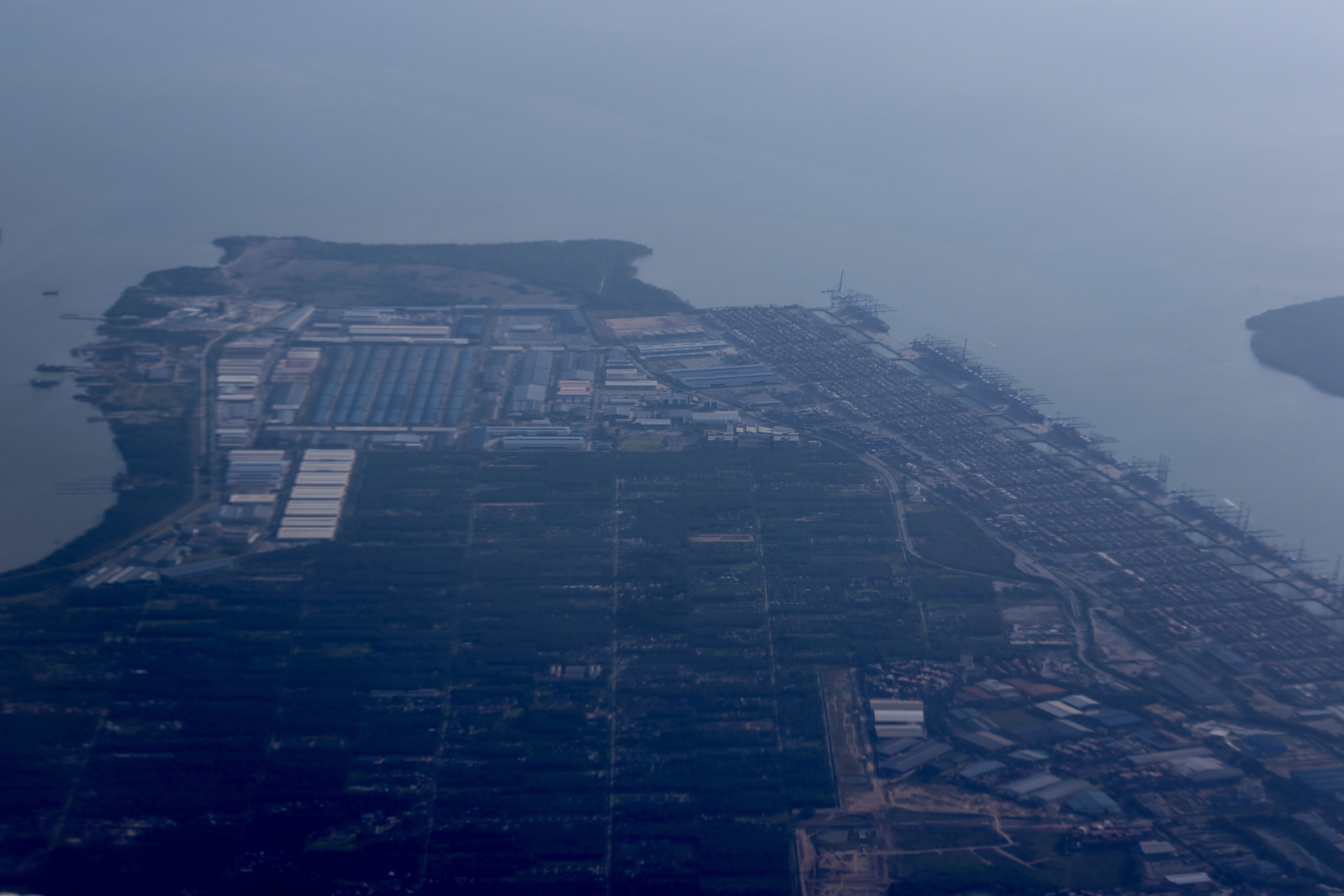
- Pulau Indah in 2023
- Interactive map of Pulau Indah

Geography
- Location: Strait of Malacca
- Coordinates: 2°56′56″N 101°19′54″E

Administration
- Malaysia
- State: Selangor
- District: Klang
- Mukim: Klang

Demographics
- Population: 20,000

Pulau Indah ("Beautiful Island", formerly known as Pulau Lumut) is an island in Klang District, Selangor, Malaysia with a population of around 20,000 people overall. Malaysia's largest port, West Port, Port Klang, is on the island.

There are two bridges linking the island to the mainland: the Pulau Indah Expressway Federal Route 181 bridge which is an extension of the Shah Alam Expressway after Pandamaran; and the South Klang Valley Expressway bridge which links Pulau Indah to Carey Island and to Teluk Panglima Garang. Prior to the completion of the bridges, the only mode of transportation for the island inhabitants was a regular one-hour ferry service to Port Klang Terminal.

There is a KTM station, connected to the rest of Tanjung Malim–Port Klang Line by a bridge parallel to the Pulau Indah Expressway, but the station is for cargo use only and not open to passengers.

In addition to West Port, Pulau Indah primarily contains Pulau Indah Industrial Park (including Selangor Halal Hub, developed by Central Spectrum (M) Sdn Bhd, a subsidiary of Kumpulan Hartanah Selangor Bhd, which in turn is wholly owned by Menteri Besar Selangor (Incorporated)), four local villages (Kg. Perigi Nenas, Kg. Sungai Pinang, Kg. Sungai Kembong, Kg. Teluk Nipah), a seaside park (Laguna Park), a housing estate (Bandar Armada Putra), and the Malaysian Navy's Pusat Hidrografi Nasional.

Pulau Indah had significant mangrove swamps, but most of the mangroves were lost by 1999 for the development of West Port and industrial estates.

== Gallery ==
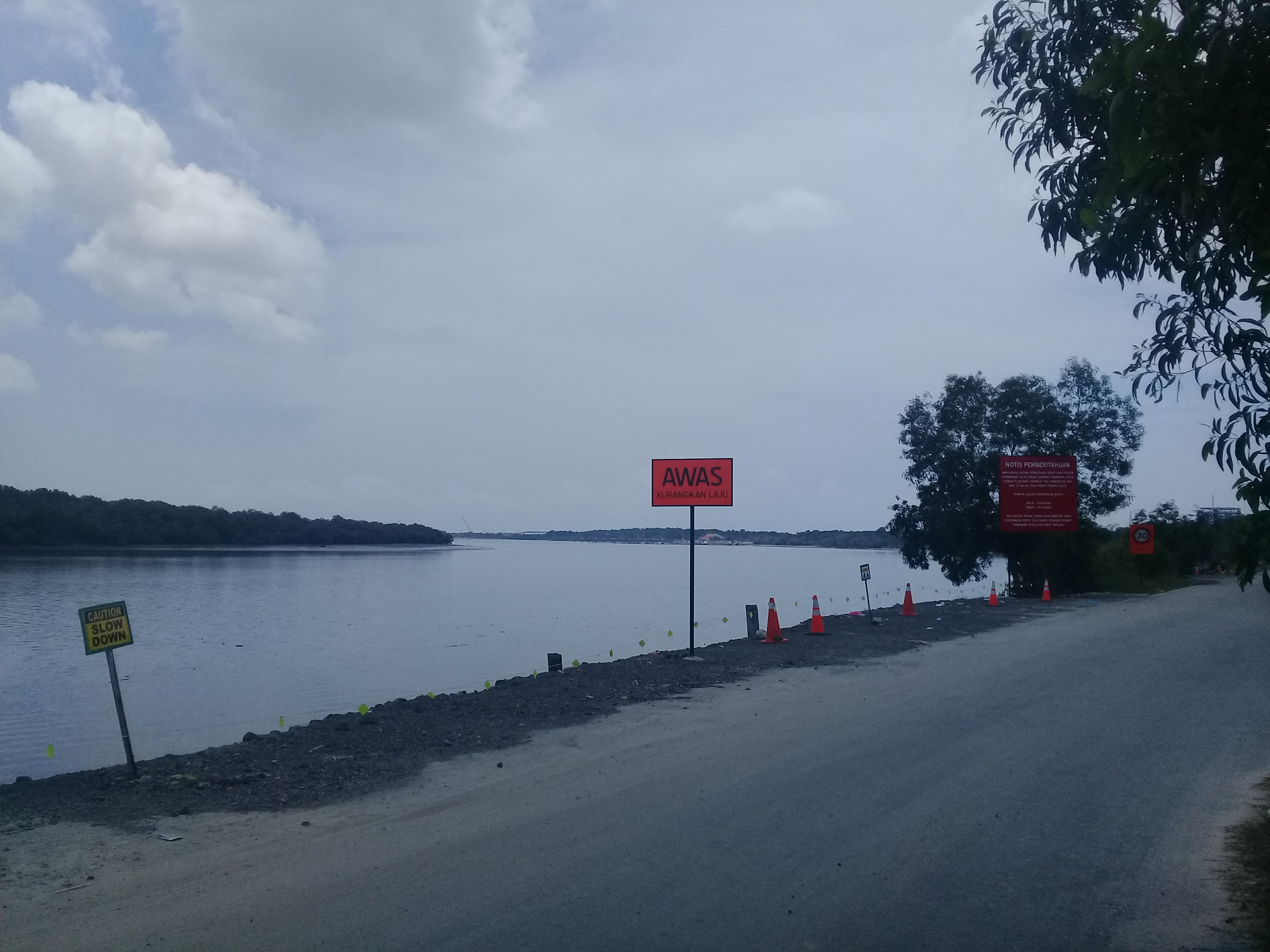
Lumut Straits

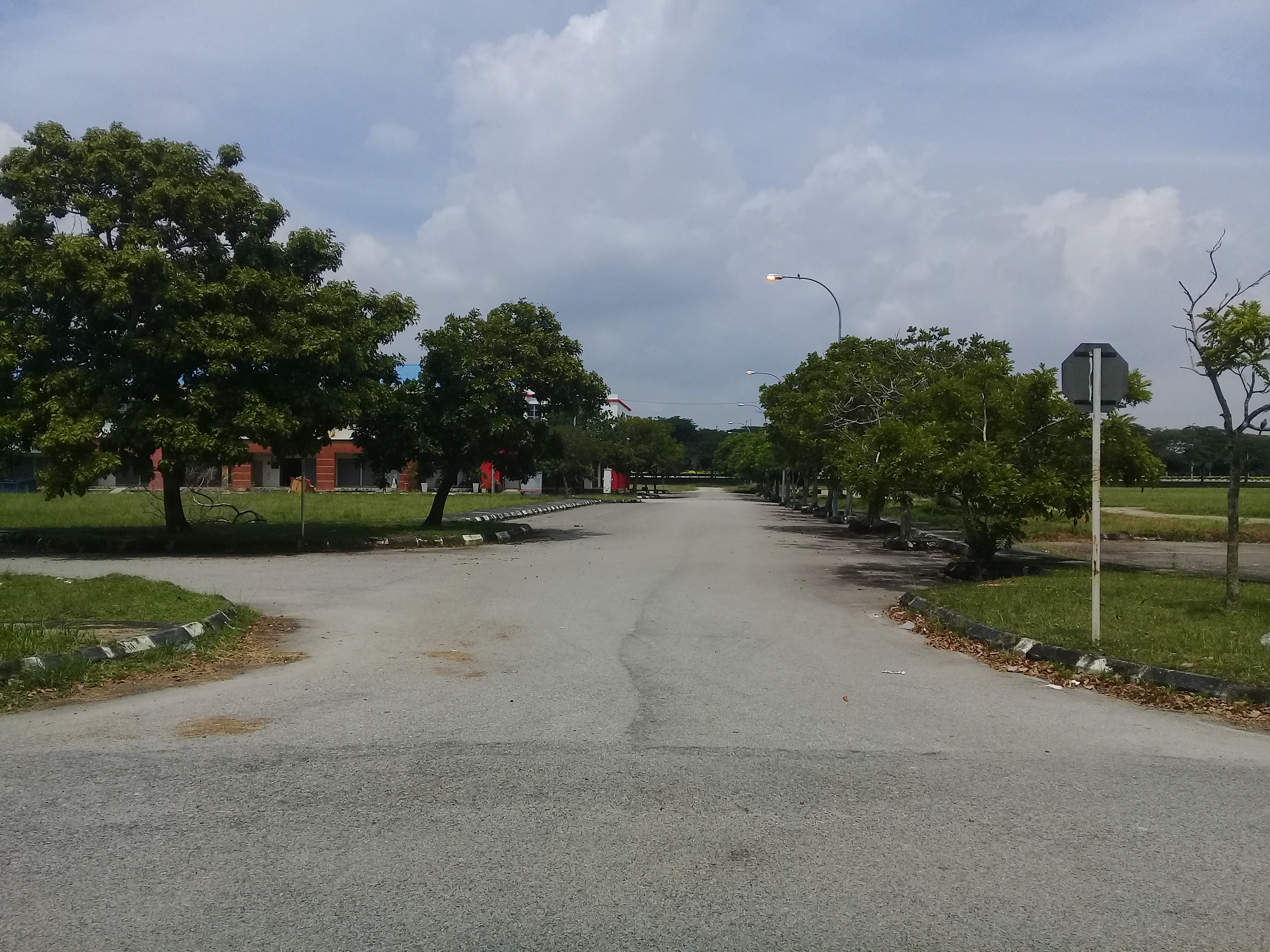
Laguna Park

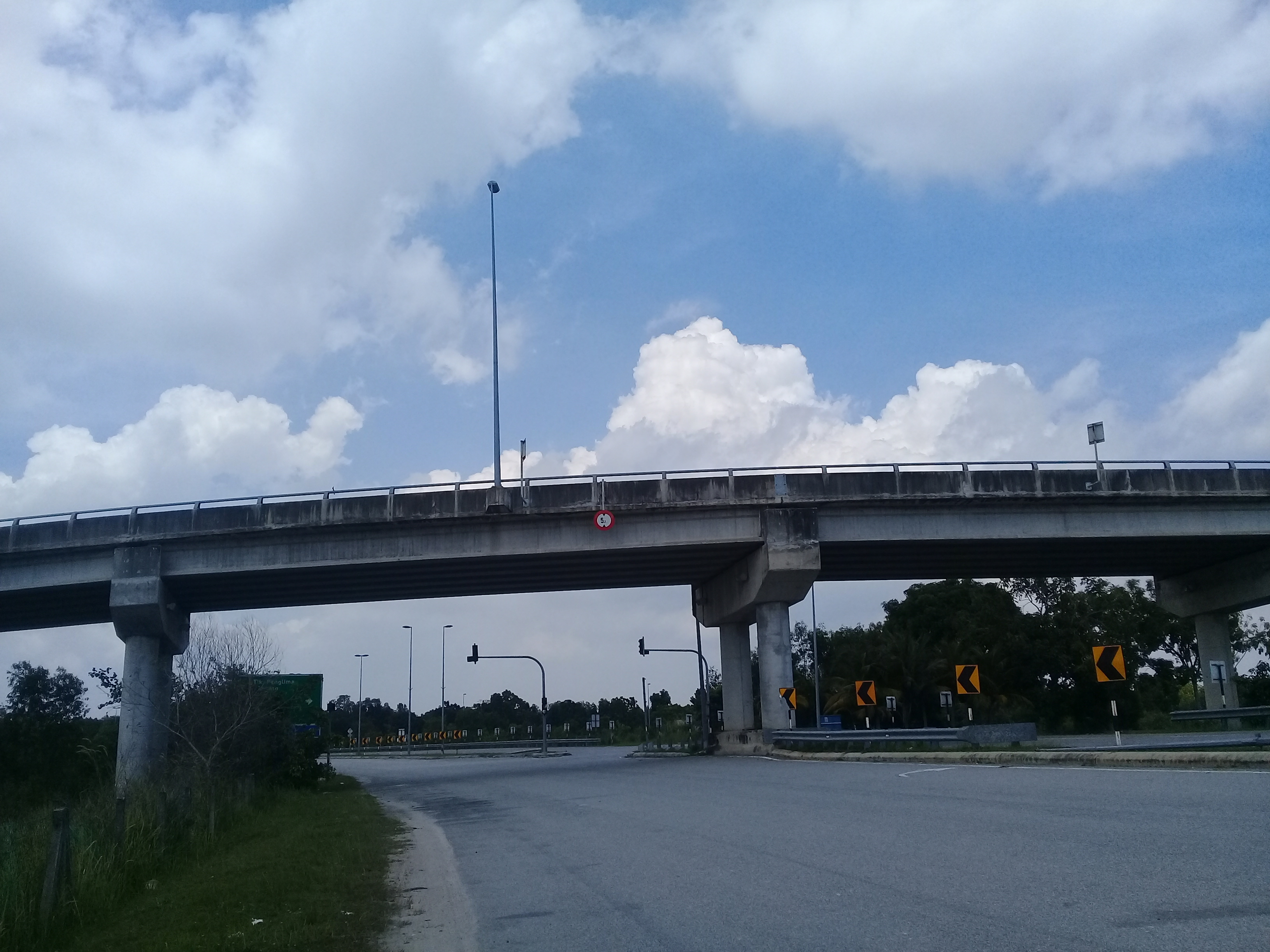
Jalan Lingkaran Pulau Indah

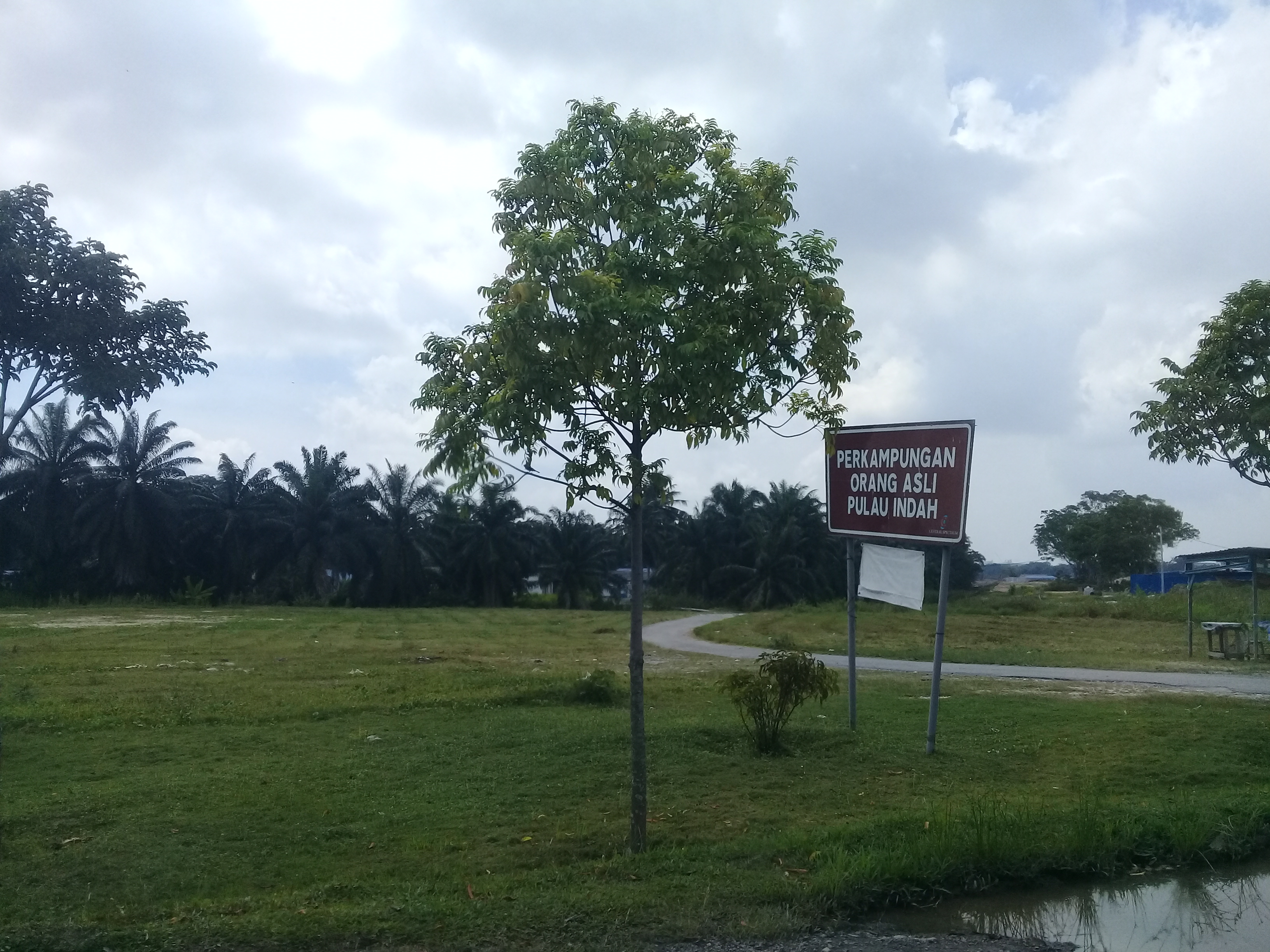
Orang Asli Village in Pulau Indah.

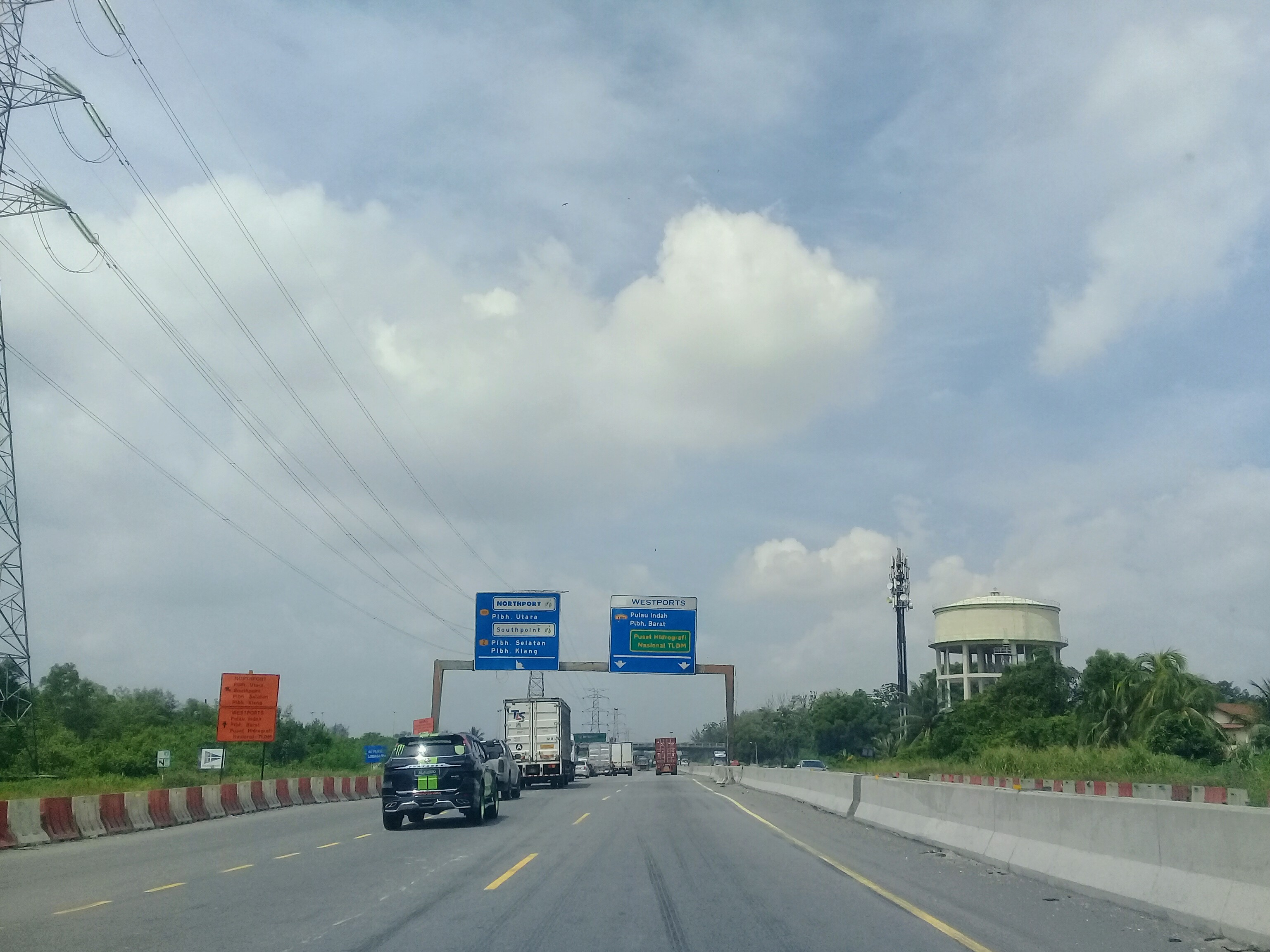
Pulau Indah Expressway

== See also ==
- List of islands of Malaysia
