= Port Klang Free Zone =

Commercial zone in Selangor, Malaysia

Port Klang Free Zone (PKFZ) is a 1,000-acre (4.0 km^{2}) commercial and industrial zone established in 2004 in Malaysia. It is a regional distribution hub as well as a trade and logistics centre offering extensive distribution and manufacturing facilities. It is located along the Straits of Malacca, Port Klang, Klang, Malaysia. The PKFZ was previously managed by Jebel Ali Free Zone Authority (JAFZA). However, it was taken over and rebranded by a local company in 2007. The PKFZ offers various investment incentives to investors such as tax exemptions on most products and services, subsidies, allowing wholly foreign owned enterprises, free repatriation of capital and profits and incentives for research and development, training and export.

== Transport connections ==
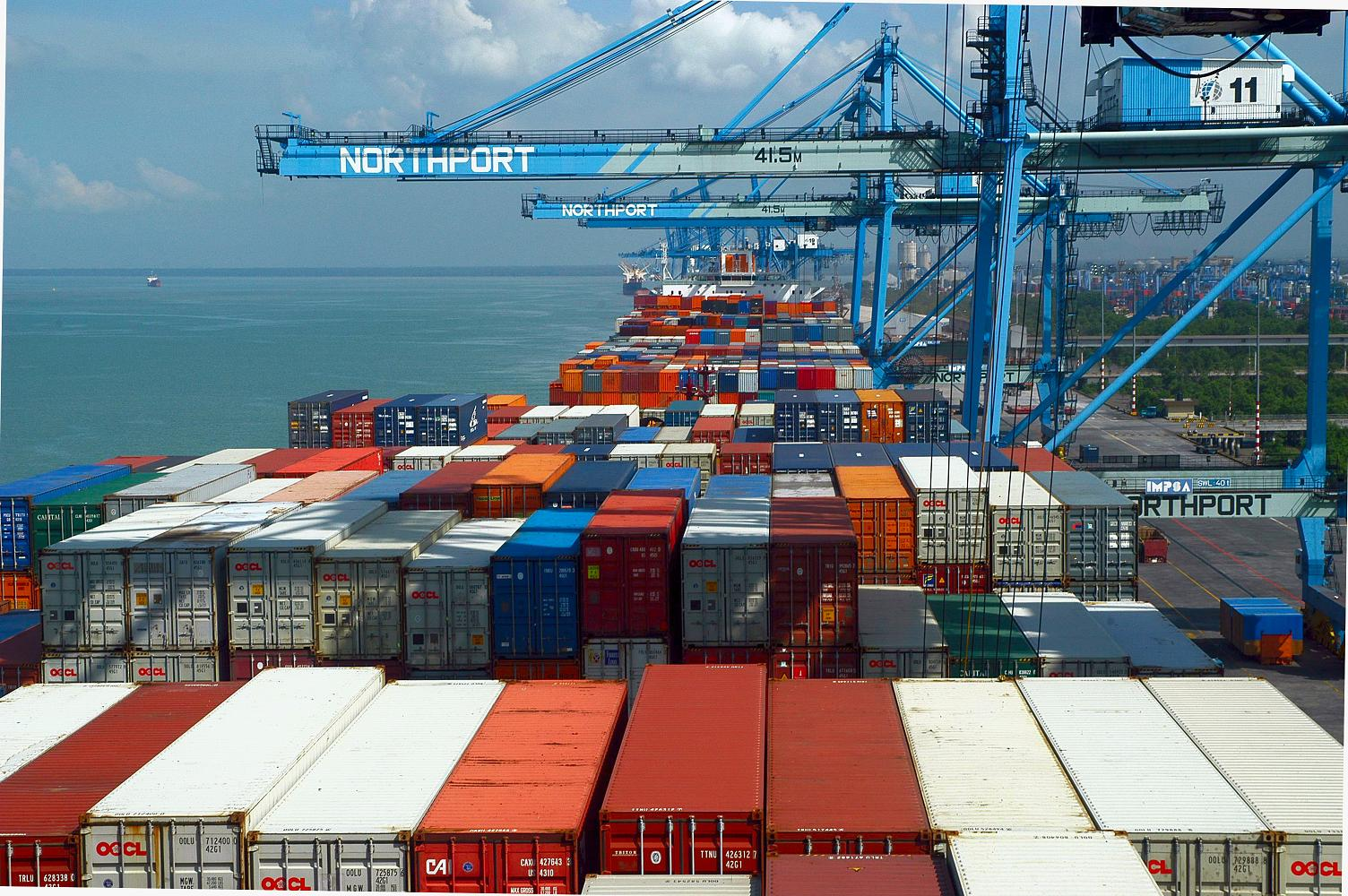
Quay Cranes at Northport Malaysia.

Port Klang is positioned to take advantage of the Kuala Lumpur International Airport. The KLIA Advance Cargo Center can handle one million tonnes of cargo annually with the capability to expand to 3 million tonnes per year. The center provides integrated logistics services.

The Port is also closely linked to Northport and Westports in Port Klang, the 12th busiest port in the world.

== Financial problems ==
Controversy began when the Malaysian Parliament's Public Accounts Committee met with the Port Klang Authority (PKA), because of dissatisfaction with huge cost overruns amounting to RM 3.5 billion (US$1.0748 billion) associated with the Port Klang Free Zone. The original cost of setting up the integrated free zone was supposed to be RM1.845 billion but increased to RM4.6 billion when the project was completed four years later.

PKA purchased 1,000 acres (4.0 km^{2}) of Pulau Indah land from Kuala Dimensi Sdn Berhad at RM 25 per square foot for a total consideration of RM 1.8 billion (inclusive of interest). Kuala Dimensi made a capital gain of RM 993 million because it had purchased the land from Pulau Lumut Development Cooperative Berhad for only RM 95 million (at RM 3 per square foot). Moreover, the Minister of Transport saw it fit to reject the Attorney-General's view that the land could be acquired for "public purpose" under the Land Acquisition Act at RM 10 per square foot.

In 2007, the Malaysian Government gave a soft loan of $1 billion to Port Klang Free Zone. In the press release, The Ministry of Transport, Malaysia put the blame on the previous regional industrial park management company of Port Klang Free Zone, JAFZA for mismanagement. The PKFZ initial plan was to develop in two phases, covering 500 acres (2.0 km^{2}) at the cost of RM 400 million. However, the JAFZA advised PKFZ to develop the entire project in a single phase, costing RM1.845 billion.

In 2008, Price Waterhouse Coopers was asked to conduct an audit in response to financial irregularities.

=== Arrests ===
In July 2010 five people were arrested and faced criminal charges due to misconduct in administering and financing the PKFZ. Attorney-General Abdul Gani Patail stated that he expected that more people will face charges in this matter.

OC Phang, the former general manager of the Port Klang Authority, was charged with criminal breach of trust related to RM254 million in expenses. Stephen Abok, the chief operating officer of PKFZ developer Kuala Dimensi, was charged with criminal breach of trust.

Bernard Tan, the architect who approved PKFZ construction, was charged with criminal breach of trust related to RM122.3 million in expenses. Law Jenn Dong was charged with 24 counts of cheating related to the development of the PKFZ. Law formerly worked as an engineer at the developer of the PKFZ. All four protested their innocence and their cases are moving to trial.

The Malaysian government has pledged to arrest and prosecute anyone guilty of wrongdoing in the PKFZ affair. Deputy Prime Minister Tan Sri Muhyiddin Yassin said, "We will not hesitate to act against anyone and we will not protect anyone." Social Care Foundation chairman Tan Sri Robert Phang said that the legal action taken demonstrates the government's will to root out corruption and improve transparency. "In the end, it is about recovering as much taxpayers' money as possible and the successful prosecution of all who exploited the PKFZ project for monetary gains," Phang said. Phang, who is also a member Malaysian Anti-Corruption Agency advisory board, also expressed his confidence that the government would handle this matter fairly due to Prime Minister Najib Abdul Razak’s pledge that no one would receive special protection.

After a joint investigation by police and the Malaysian Anti-Corruption Commission, former transport minister Ling Liong Sik was charged with cheating in connection to irregularities in land valuations inside the PKFZ in late July 2010. Ling led the Malaysian Chinese Association (MCA), a member of the ruling coalition, Barisan Nasional, for 18 years and was given the title of "Tun", the highest title awarded by the federal government. He is the most senior official accused so far in the PKFZ affair. Ling pleaded "not guilty" immediately after being charged. Ling was released on RM1 million bail. If convicted he could be sentenced to up seven years in prison.

=== Whistleblower policy ===
As part of the broader Government Transformation Programme and in response to the Port Klang Free Zone's financial problems, the Malaysian Transport Ministry has adopted a "whistleblowers policy" to protect people who report corruption related to Malaysia's ports. An appointed ministry representative will be put in place at the Port Klang Authority (PKA) to receive complaints from all parties including port staff, vendors, board members, and the public. A link will be placed on the PKA website for reporting a wide range of misconduct such as mismanagement, corruption, conflicts of interest, abuse of power, procurement issues, and sexual harassment. Under this policy informants' identities will be kept secret and they will be protected from retaliation. The Transport Ministry says no disciplinary action will be taken against informants who report in good faith even if their concerns later prove to be unfounded. Deliberate false reports may be punished.

== See also ==
- Jebel Ali Free Zone
- Port Klang
- Port Klang Authority
