= West Port, Malaysia =

Multi-cargo terminal in Port Klang, Malaysia

Coordinates: 2.949834°N 101.307635°E

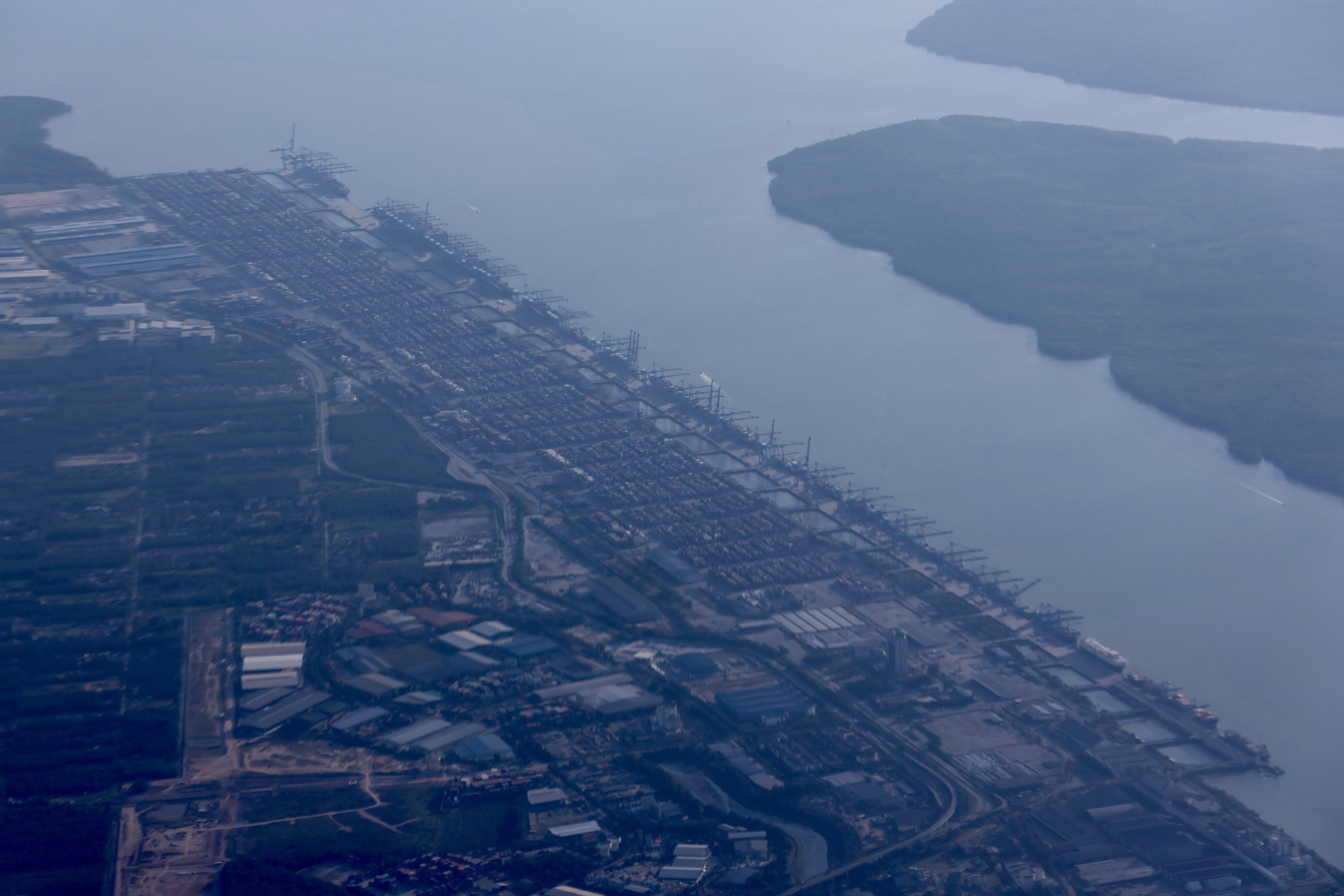
Aerial view of the multi-cargo terminal on Pulau Indah in 2023.

Westports Malaysia Sdn Bhd (formerly known as Kelang Multi Terminal Sdn Bhd) is a multi-cargo terminal located on Pulau Indah, Port Klang, Malaysia which is accessible by road via Pulau Indah Expressway, connecting to the KESAS Highway. On 1 October 2013, Pulau Indah was directly connected to the Malaysian Administrative Capital, Putrajaya via the South Klang Valley Expressway.

Westports is the first port in Malaysia to have a fully automated operation system. It handles all types of cargoes in containers, breakbulk, dry bulk, liquid bulk, vehicles (roll-on roll-off) and other conventional cargoes. Located along the straits of Malacca, Westports, collectively with Northport as Port Klang, has become the 18th busiest seaport in the world.

Ruben Gnanalingam is the company's CEO.

== History ==
During privatisation by the government of Malaysia in the early 1990s, Port of Port Klang was subdivided into 3 terminals which are now known as Northport, Southpoint and Westports. Westport, the newest of the three private terminals, was given a 30-year concession with an additional 30 year option by the government at RM 3 billion. It began operations in September 1994 in a smaller scale before later expanding.

Kelang Multi Terminal Sdn Bhd, the original name of the operator of Westport, is a consortium consisting of Pembinaan Redzai, Advance Synergy Berhad, Semakin Ajaib, Lembaga Urusan Tabung Haji and Permodalan Negeri Selangor, the investment arm of the state of Selangor.

Starting out as Kelang Multi Terminal Sdn Bhd in 1994, renamed as Westport Sdn Bhd since 1997 and now known as Westports Malaysia Sdn Bhd, the seaport terminal has played a leading role in Malaysia's efforts to provide storage, bunkering, cargo/freight handling and other port related facilities which add to Malaysia's importance as a link in the global maritime trade. Westport is aimed at the Indian shipping community, enticing them to choose Westport over Singapore's as the trans-shipment hub of Asia.

The first of its two box terminals started operations in March 1996, with the second expected to be opened in June and the third in December. The first container had three berths in 600 metres, with the third having six. All three terminals would have 19 berths, eventually becoming 32 berths when fully developed.

Westport was launched on 10 September 1996, targeting 3,000,000 TEUs by 2000 and aim to be among the top 10 ports in the world.

Many of the developments at Westport that were planned to be ready by 2000 began in 1994 and were completed shortly before the 1997 Asian financial crisis.

Westport handled 120,000 TEUs in 1997.

By 1998, it became the fastest growing container port in Malaysia, thanks to the government's recommendation of shippers to use local ports and the continuous availability of empty boxes at the port. It handled 162,000 TEUs between January and June 1998, compared to 38,000 TEUs from the same period in the previous year. The other two ports, Northport and Southpoint, however, had weaker performance.

In April 1998, Westport launched its own feeder service – Westport Express Service – to support the mainline operators and non-vessel operating common carriers using the terminal. One of their routes were from Penang to Westport and from Pasir Gudang to Westport.

Sometime in 1998, Westport began adding a slag terminal and additional container yard.

A 11.2 km single track line connecting Westport and the Port Klang station began operations on 9 December 1998, costing RM 383 million. Using block trains to carry logistics in the track line, it would operate four times a day. Each train will have a capacity of 60 TEUs. The track would be able to carry 14 trains per day.

Located on the island of Pulau Indah (formerly Pulau Lumut), Westports have transformed the island's natural swamplands and sands into a multi-cargo seaport terminal. With the current quay length of 3.2 kilometers, which includes 5 container terminals, Westports are able to handle up to 7.5 million TEUs yearly, with the potential to expand to a further 4 container terminals which would give a total capacity of 15 million TEUs.

== Port Services ==
=== Overview ===
Container
Container operations is the core business of Westports.

=== Facilities ===
Container Terminal

- Berth length 11 berths (16 meter depth)| 3200 meters
- Terminal capacity 280 acres (110 hectares) out of total built up area of 1,350 acres (550 hectares) | 7.2 million TEU capacity per year

- CT 1 - 40 acres (16 hectares)
- CT 2 - 60 acres (24 hectares)
- CT 3 - 60 acres (24 hectares)
- CT 4 - 60 acres (24 hectares)
- CT 5 - 60 acres (24 hectares)

- Equipments

- 56 Quay Cranes (QC)
- 214 Rubber Tyred Gantrys (RTG)
- 273 Prime Movers (PM)
- 25 Reach Stackers
- 1,236 Refrigerated Points (Reefers)
- 25,036 Total Ground Slots

== Award ==
2010 - July Asia HRD Congress Award
