= Northport Highway =

Road in Malaysia

Federal Route 103
- Northport Highway (Jalan Pelabuhan Utara)

Route information
- Maintained by Malaysian Public Works Department
- Length: 4.43 km (2.75 mi)

Major junctions
- North end: Northport Container Terminal
- New North Klang Straits Bypass / FT 20 / AH141; FT 180 North–South Port Link; FT 2 Persiaran Raja Muda Musa
- South end: Port Klang

Location
- Country: Malaysia
- Primary destinations: Bandar Sultan Suleiman, Tanjung Harapan

Highway system
- Highways in Malaysia; Expressways; Federal; State

Northport Highway, alternately Jalan Pelabuhan Utara, Federal Route 103 or Jalan Parang is an expressway in Port Klang, Selangor, Malaysia. It connects Port Klang in the south to Northport in the north.

The Kilometre Zero of the Federal Route 103 starts at Port Klang.

At most sections, the Federal Route 103 was built under the JKR R5 road standard, allowing maximum speed limit of up to 90 km/h.

== History ==
Construction of the Northport access flyover from Jalan Kurau with trumpet interchange started in 2012 and was completed in early 2014.

Construction of the railway crossing bridge replacing level crossing and extension of the Port Klang flyover started in 2013 and was completed in 2015.

== Junction lists ==
The entire route is located in Klang District, Selangor.

Legend:

- I/C - Interchange, I/S - Intersection, RSA - Rest and service area, OBR - Overhead bridge restaurant, R/R - Restaurant and rest plaza, L/B - Layby, V/P - Vista point, TN - tunnel, T/P - Toll plaza, BR - Bridge
- C - Cloverleaf, S - Stack, T-A - Trumpet-A, T-B - Trumpet-B, DT - Directional-T/Y, SDT - Semi-Directional-T/Y, P-Y - Partial-Y, D - Diamond, P-C - Partial cloverleaf, D-D - Diverging diamond, D-R - Direct ramp

Location	km	mi	Exit	Name	Destinations	Notes
Northport				Northport Container Terminal	Main terminal	
Northport	4.4	2.7		Northport Container Terminal; Customs checkpoint	Customs	U-Turn
Northport			Start/End of separated carriageway			
Northport				New Northport	Port Klang, Klang, Shah Alam, Kuala Lumpur,Bandar Sultan Suleiman Commercial Centre	Trumpet interchange From Jalan Kurau only
Northport	4.2	2.6		Northport Container Terminal	NPCT headquarters	Interchange
Northport				Bandar Sultan Suleiman Commercial Centre	Bandar Sultan Suleiman Commercial Centre	Southbound
Northport	4.0	2.5		Northport I/C	New North Klang Straits Bypass / FT 20 / AH141 – Kapar, Meru, Shah Alam, Kuala Lumpur; Persiaran Sultan Hishamuddin – Port Klang Industrial Area, Tanjung Harapan	Junctions with one bridge to South Port
Northport				Bandar Sultan Suleiman	Lebuh Sultan Abdul Samad – Bandar Sultan Suleiman Residential Area	From Northport only
Northport			Port Klang bridge Klang River; Separated bridge			
Northport			Start/End of separated carriageway			
Northport				Northport Highway I/C	Port Klang Flyover; FT 180 North–South Port Link – Pulau Indah, Westport, Banting; Shah Alam Expressway – Subang Jaya, Sri Petaling, Kuala Lumpur International Airport (KLIA), Johor Bahru	Ramp on/off
Port Klang				South Port Industrial Area I/C	Persiaran Seri Junjung – South Port Industrial Area	T-junctions
Port Klang			Railway crossing bridge			
Port Klang				Port Klang Authority Main Headquarters	Port Klang Authority Main Headquarters	
Port Klang				Emulco Sdn Bhd	Emulco Sdn Bhd	
Port Klang			Railway crossing bridge U-Turn			
Port Klang	0.0	0.0		Port Klang; Port Klang I/S	Southpoint – Port Klang Komuter station, Port Klang Ferry Terminal (to Pulau Ketam and International terminal to Dumai and Tanjungbalai (Indonesia)); FT 2 Persiaran Raja Muda Musa – Klang, Shah Alam, Kuala Lumpur	Junctions
Port Klang			Through to FT 180 North–South Port Link			
1.000 mi = 1.609 km; 1.000 km = 0.621 mi: Incomplete access; Route transition
