= Selangor State Route B5 =

Road in Malaysia

Selangor Route 5
- Jalan Dato' Mohd Sidin (Jalan Jambatan Connaught)

Major junctions
- From: Jalan Batu Tiga Lama
- FT 3216 Federal Route 3216; FT 190 Federal Route 190
- To: Jalan Sungai Kandis

Location
- Country: Malaysia
- Primary destinations: Klang, Sungai Kandis

Highway system
- Highways in Malaysia; Expressways; Federal; State

Selangor State Route B5, Jalan Dato' Mohd Sidin or Jalan Jambatan Connaught is a major road in Klang Valley region, Selangor, Malaysia.

== Junction lists ==
The entire route is located in Klang District, Selangor.

Legend:

- I/C - Interchange, I/S - Intersection, RSA - Rest and service area, OBR - Overhead bridge restaurant, R/R - Restaurant and rest plaza, L/B - Layby, V/P - Vista point, TN - tunnel, T/P - Toll plaza, BR - Bridge
- C - Cloverleaf, S - Stack, T-A - Trumpet-A, T-B - Trumpet-B, DT - Directional-T/Y, SDT - Semi-Directional-T/Y, P-Y - Partial-Y, D - Diamond, P-C - Partial cloverleaf, D-D - Diverging diamond, D-R - Direct ramp

Location	km	mi	Name	Destinations	Notes
Klang			Jalan Batu Tiga Lama	FT 3216 Malaysia Federal Route 3216 – Klang city centre, Berkeley Garden, Padang Jawa, Shah Alam (FH2), Kuala Lumpur (FH2); New North Klang Straits Bypass / FT 20 – Bukit Raja, Meru, Kapar, Kuala Lumpur, Ipoh	Junctions
Klang			Taman Bukit Kuda	Jalan Landasan – Taman Bukit Kuda, Kampung Bukit Kuda	T-junctions
Klang			Klang River bridge Connaught Bridge		
Klang			Connaught Bridge Power Station (Gate 2)		T-junctions
Klang			Railway crossing bridge		
Klang			Muslim Cemetery	Muslim Cemetery	T-junctions
Klang			Connaught Bridge Power Station (Gate 1)	Connaught Bridge Power Station (Gate 1) – TNB Staff Quarters, Power station manager residences	T-junctions
Klang			Jalan Sungai Kandis	FT 190 Malaysia Federal Route 190 – Klang city centre, Sultan Sulaiman Mosque, Istana Alam Shah, Galeri Diraja Sultan Abdul Aziz Shah, Gedung Raja Abdullah (Tin Museum), Sungai Kandis, Bukit Kemuning; Shah Alam Expressway – Pulau Indah, West Port, South Port, North Port, Subang Jaya, Petaling Jaya, Sri Petaling, Kuala Lumpur, Cheras, Kuantan, Kuala Lumpur International Airport (KLIA), Johor Bahru	T-junctions
1.000 mi = 1.609 km; 1.000 km = 0.621 mi
