= 99 Speedmart =

Malaysia convenience store chain

99 Speed Mart Retail Holdings Berhad
- 99 Speedmart Logo

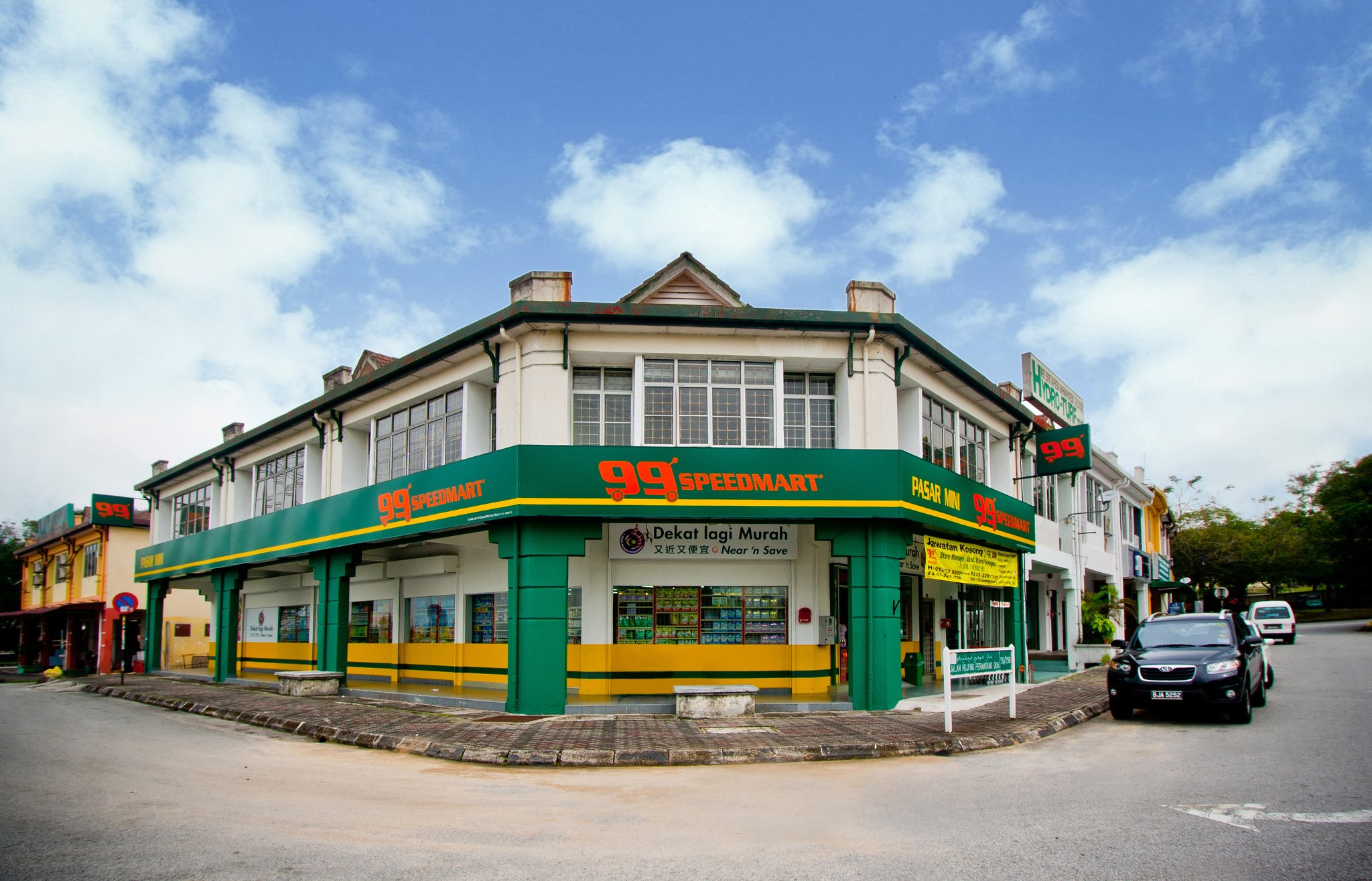
- A corner lot outlet of 99 Speedmart
- Trade name: 99 Speedmart
- Formerly: 99 Market
- Type: Private limited company
- Traded as: MYX: 5326
- ISIN: MYL5326OO003
- Industry: Retail: Convenience stores Grocery stores
- Founded: 1987; 39 years ago in Klang, Selangor, Malaysia
- Headquarters: Taman Berkeley, Klang, Selangor, Malaysia
- Number of locations: 2800+ (2025)
- Area served: Malaysia; China
- Key people: Lee Thiam Wah (Founder, MD)
- Revenue: ▲RM 9.981 billion(2024); RM 9.214 billion(2023); RM 8.075 billion(2022)
- Net income: ▲RM 0.49 billion(2024); RM 0.4 billion (2023)
- Website: www.99speedmart.com.my

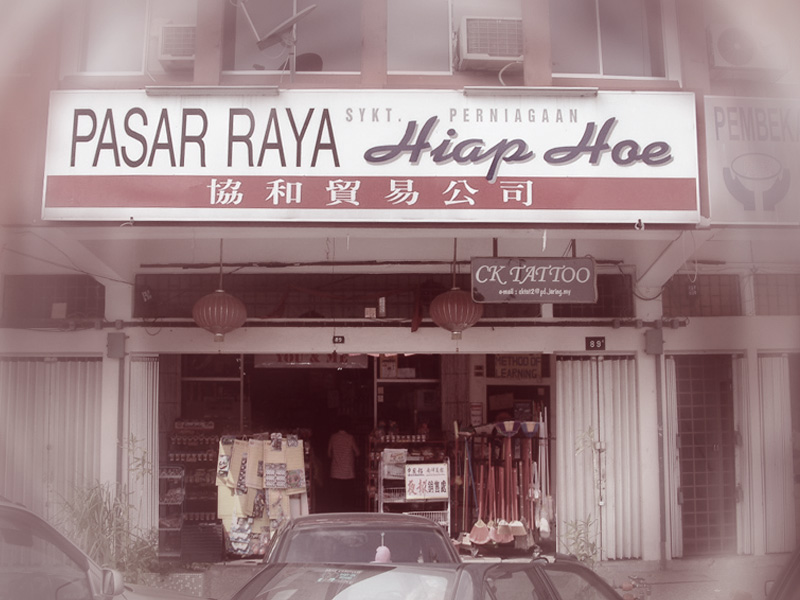
Founded in 1987 as a sundry mart under the name of Pasar Raya Hiap Hoe (Tepi Sungai, Klang)

99 Speedmart is a Malaysian chain of convenience stores and is one of the largest mini market chain in the country, before KK Super Mart. Colloquially referred to as 99 or Speedmart by locals. It was founded by Lee Thiam Wah in 1987 as a traditional sundry store in Klang, Selangor. After the rebranding of 99 Market to 99 Speedmart in 2000, the company expanded with a new store opening at Batu Belah, Klang. Since its inception, 99 Speedmart has evolved from a single mini market to the largest mini market retail chain in Malaysia.

As of 22 November 2022, 99 Speedmart has more than 2,000 outlets. A significant majority of them are located in the west coast of Peninsular Malaysia with a growing presence in Sabah and Sarawak.

From 2025, 99 Speedmart began to expand overseas business. The first overseas store opened on 31 August 2025 in Fuzhou, China.

== History ==
In 1987, Lee established a sundry shop called Pasar Raya Hiap Hoe after selling snacks at the front porch of his house to gain capital at the age of 23. He sold the shop after five years and renamed it to Pasar Mini 99. The newly renamed store was opened in Klang Utama. He opened an additional 8 stores in the Klang Valley. He renamed 99 Market to 99 Speedmart in 2000. Lee has clarified the number "99" is "not perfect" and symbolizes the stores are ready to give "the best service for every customer".

The 1,000th store was opened in Seksyen 13 in Shah Alam, and their 2,000th was opened in Puncak Sentul, Kuala Lumpur.

As of early 2020, there were around 3 stores in Singapore. The stores quickly closed down due to the COVID-19 pandemic.

On 31 August 2025, 99 Speedmart opened in Fuzhou, China, which was branded under "99 Mini-Mart". Its 3,000th store was later opened in Novmeber 2025 at bestari Jaya, Selangor.
