= New North Klang Straits Bypass =

Countryside parkway in Klang, Malaysia

Expressway 30
- New North Klang Straits Bypass; Lebuhraya Pintas Selat Klang Utara Baru 新巴生北部海峡环城大道
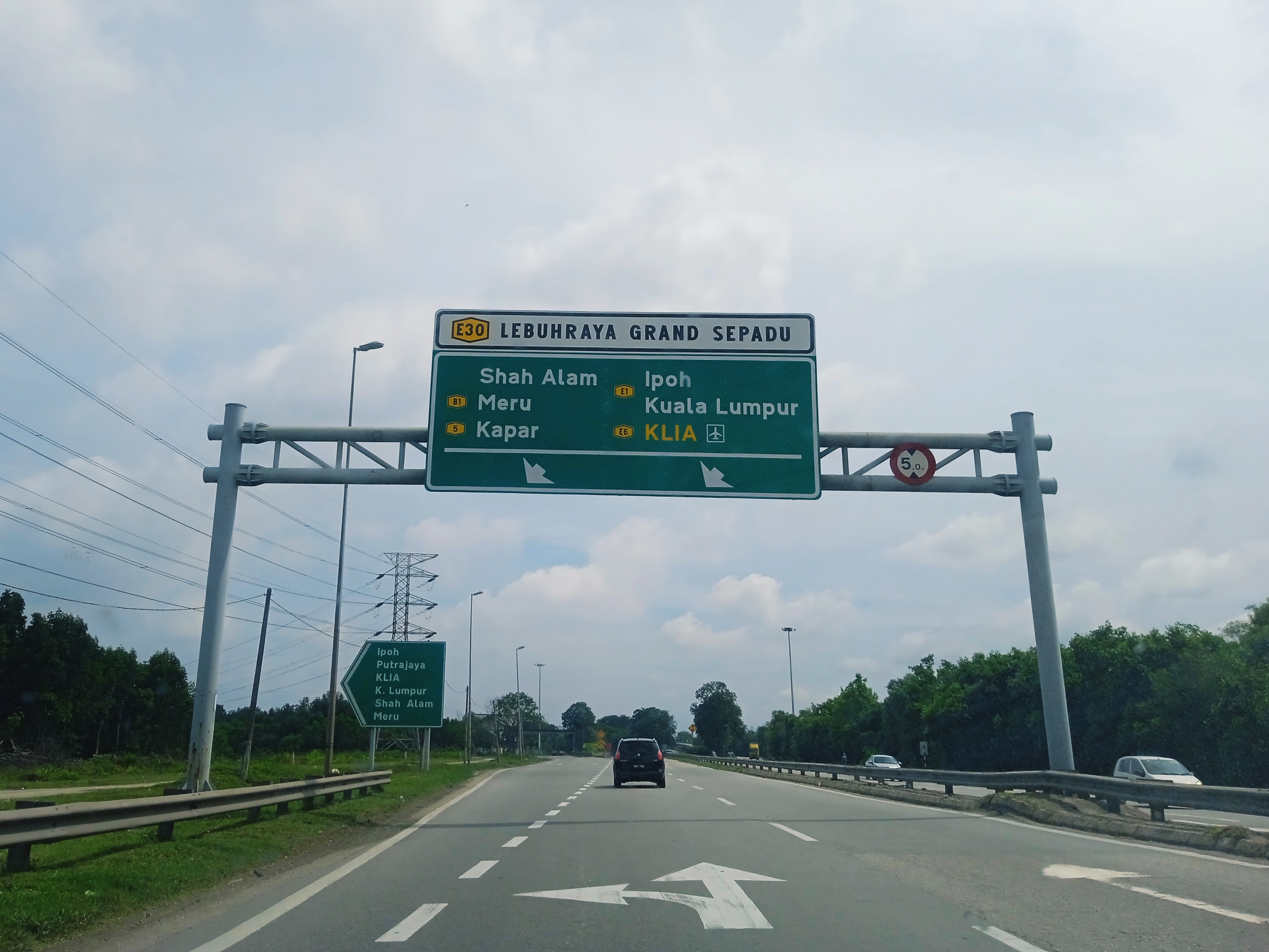
- New North Klang Straits Bypass entrance at Bandar Sultan Suleiman, Klang

Route information
- Part of AH141
- Maintained by Grand Sepadu (NK) Sdn Bhd (formerly known as Lebuhraya Shapadu Sdn Bhd (LSSB))
- Length: 17.5 km (10.9 mi)
- Existed: 1996–present
- History: Completed in 1998

Major junctions
- West end: Northport, Port Klang
- FT 5 Federal Route 5 FT 3217 Federal Route 3217; West Coast Expressway New Klang Valley Expressway / AH141; FT 20 North Klang Straits Bypass; FT 103 Northport Highway
- East end: Bukit Raja

Location
- Country: Malaysia
- Primary destinations: Kapar, Meru

Highway system
- Highways in Malaysia; Expressways; Federal; State

New North Klang Straits Bypass (NNKSB) or Grand Sepadu/Shapadu Highway (E30/AH141) (Malay: Lebuhraya Pintas Selat Klang Utara Baru or Lebuhraya Grand Sepadu/Shapadu) is an expressway in Klang, Selangor, Malaysia. The 17.5 km (10.9 mi) expressway also acts as the North Klang Straits Bypass (Federal Route 20) to avoid the accident-prone area on this road.

== Route background ==
The Kilometre Zero of the expressway is located at Northport Interchange near Port Klang.

== History ==
Lebuhraya Shapadu Sdn Bhd (LSSB) (a member of the Shapadu Corporation Sdn Bhd) was awarded the highway concession by the government on 1 August 1995 to construct, maintain and operate the NNKSB. The total project including land acquisition cost an estimated RM 536 million. The expressway, with a paid-up capital of RM 20 million, is a 17.5 km (10.9 mi) two-lane dual carriageway, linking Port Klang to Klang town. Once completed, it will be a catalyst to the surrounding infrastructural development and development of Port Klang. This highway is equipped with a Traffic Surveillance System (TSS) and a Rest and Service Area in Kapar.

In 2014, the expressway was taken over to Grand Saga, a subsidiary of LGB Group which changes its name to Grand Sepadu Sdn Bhd.

== Toll systems ==
The New North Klang Straits Bypass uses opened toll systems. Since 1 June 2016, all toll transactions have been conducted electronically using SmartTAG or Touch 'n Go cards.

=== Toll rates ===
Class	Type of vehicles	Rate (in Malaysian Ringgit (RM))			
Class	Type of vehicles	Bukit Raja	Kapar Exit/Entrance		Kapar (Highway mainline)
Class	Type of vehicles	Bukit Raja	From/towards Bukit Raja	From/towards Port Klang	Kapar (Highway mainline)
0	Motorcycles (Vehicles with two axles and two wheels)	Free			
1	Private Cars (Vehicles with two axles and three or four wheels (excluding taxi and bus))	0.60	1.40	1.60	2.70
2	Vans and other small good vehicles (Vehicles with two axles and six wheels (excluding bus))	1.10	2.50	2.80	4.80
3	Large Trucks (Vehicles with three or more axles (excluding bus))	1.60	3.50	4.00	6.80
4	Taxis	0.30	0.70	0.80	1.40
5	Buses	0.60	1.30	1.40	2.40

== Interchange and rest and service area lists ==
The entire route is located in Klang District, Selangor.

Legend:

- I/C - Interchange, I/S - Intersection, RSA - Rest and service area, OBR - Overhead bridge restaurant, R/R - Restaurant and rest plaza, L/B - Layby, V/P - Vista point, TN - tunnel, T/P - Toll plaza, BR - Bridge
- C - Cloverleaf, S - Stack, T-A - Trumpet-A, T-B - Trumpet-B, DT - Directional-T/Y, SDT - Semi-Directional-T/Y, P-Y - Partial-Y, D - Diamond, P-C - Partial cloverleaf, D-D - Diverging diamond, D-R - Direct ramp

km			Exit	Name	Destinations	Notes
E30	AH141	FT20	Exit	Name	Destinations	Notes
0.0			3008B	Northport I/C	FT 103 Northport Highway – Northport, Port Klang town centre, Klang, Pulau Indah; Persiaran Sultan Hisamuddin – Port Klang Industrial Area, Tanjung Harapan	Diamond interchange Western terminus of concurrency with AH141/FT20
0.4			3008A	Bandar Sultan Suleiman Commercial Centre Exit	Solok Sultan Mohammad 1 – Bandar Sultan Suleiman Commercial Centre; Petron	Bukit Raja bound
1.0			–	–		
			3007C	Jalan Sultan Mohammad 1 Exit	Jalan Sultan Mohammad 1 – Bandar Sultan Suleiman Industrial Area	Bukit Raja bound
1.0			3007B	Bandar Sultan Suleiman I/C	Lebuh Sultan Abdul Samad – Bandar Sultan Suleiman Residential Area, Masjid Bandar Sultan Suleiman	Port Klang bound
1.8			3007A	Bandar Sultan Suleiman I/C	Lebuh Sultan Mohammad 1 – Bandar Sultan Suleiman Industrial Area	Diamond interchange
2.0			–	–		
2.6			3006B	Jalan Sultan Abdul Samad 40 Exit	Jalan Sultan Abdul Samad 40 – Bandar Sultan Suleiman Residential Area	Port Klang bound
3.0			3006A	Lebuh Sultan Mohammad 1 Exit	Lebuh Sultan Mohammad 1 – Bandar Sultan Suleiman Industrial Area	Bukit Raja bound
			BR	Sungai Che Awang bridge		
4.0			3005	North Klang I/C	FT 20 North Klang Straits Bypass – Klang, Kampung Rantau Panjang	From/to Port Klang only
5.0		—N/a	–	–		
6.0		—N/a	BR	Bridge		
6.5		—N/a	–	–		
7.0		—N/a	BR	Bridge		
		—N/a	3004B	Kapar I/C	FT 5 Jalan Kapar – Kapar, Kuala Selangor, Teluk Intan, Klang	Parclo interchange
		—N/a	T/P	Kapar Toll Plaza	Touch 'n Go SmartTAG MyRFID	
		—N/a	3004A	Kapar I/C	B4 Selangor State Route B4 – Kuala Selangor, Kapar, Klang	Eastbound exit to west and westbound entrance from east only
		—N/a	RSA	North Klang RSA	North Klang RSA – Petronas	Westbound only
9.0		—N/a	–	–		
9.8		—N/a	3003	Meru I/C	FT 3217 Malaysia Federal Route 3217 – Meru, Bestari Jaya (Batang Berjuntai), Puncak Alam, Setia Alam	Eastbound exit to north and westbound entrances only
10.0		—N/a	–	–		
11.0		—N/a	–	–		
		—N/a	3002A	WCE - NNKSB 2 I/C	West Coast Expressway – Lumut, Sabak Bernam, Tanjung Karang, Ijok, Puncak Alam	From/to Sungai Rasau only
		—N/a	3002	Bukit Raja North I/C	FT 20 North Klang Straits Bypass – Meru, Kampung Batu Belah	From/to Sungai Rasau only
15.0		12.0	–	–		
15.7		12.7		Persiaran Bukit Raja Exit	Persiaran Bukit Raja – Bandar Baru Klang	LILO Westbound
16.0		13.0	3001A 3001B	Bukit Raja I/C	Persiaran Waja – Bukit Raja Industrial Area New Klang Valley Expressway / AH2 / AH141 – Ipoh, Damansara, Kuala Lumpur, Kuala Lumpur International Airport (KLIA), Johor Bahru, Singapore	Trumpet interchange with a ramp towards northeast Eastern terminus of concurrency with AH141
17.0	—N/a	14.0	–	Lebuh Keluli Exit	Lebuh Keluli – Bukit Raja Industrial Area (South), Section 7 Shah Alam	Sungai Rasau bound LILO
	—N/a			Sungai Rasau	FT 2 Federal Highway – Shah Alam, Klang; FT 3216 Jalan Batu Tiga Lama	Diamond interchange and T-junctions

== See also ==
- FT 20 North Klang Straits Bypass
