= List of highways numbered 5 =

Route 5, or Highway 5, may refer to routes in the following countries:

== International ==
- AH5 Asian Highway 5
- E05 European route E05
- E005 European route E005

== Argentina ==
- National Route 5

== Australia ==
=== New South Wales ===
- M5 Motorway (Sydney)
- The Detour or Toll free Route of the M5 East (https://roadsaustralia.weebly.com/sydneys-guide-to-toll-roads.html)

=== Northern Territory ===
- Tanami Road

=== Queensland ===
- Centenary Motorway (Brisbane)
  - Centenary Motorway (Brisbane)
  - Western Freeway (Brisbane)
- Legacy Way (Brisbane)
- State Route 5 (Queensland) – Peak Downs Highway
- Metroad 5 – Brisbane

=== South Australia ===
- Anzac Highway, Adelaide

=== Tasmania ===
- Lake Highway, Tasmania

=== Victoria ===
Metropolitan route 5

=== Western Australia ===
- State Route 5 (Western Australia) – Stirling Highway, Mounts Bay Road, Riverside Drive, and The Causeway

== Austria ==
- Nord Autobahn

== Belarus ==
- M 5 M5 highway (Belarus)

== Bolivia ==
- National Route 5 (Bolivia)

== Bulgaria ==
- Автомагистрала „Черно море“/Black Sea motorway
- Републикански път I-5/Route 5 (I-5/E85)

== Burma ==
- National Highway 5 (Burma)

== Cambodia ==
- National Highway 5 (Cambodia)

== Chile ==
- Chile Highway 5 - Panamericana

== Canada ==
- Alberta Highway 5
- British Columbia Highway 5 (Yellowhead Highway)
- Manitoba Highway 5
- Northwest Territories Highway 5
- Nova Scotia Trunk 5
- Ontario Highway 5
- Prince Edward Island Route 5
- Quebec Autoroute 5
- Quebec Route 5 (former)
- Saskatchewan Highway 5
- Yukon Highway 5 (Dempster Highway)

== China ==
- G5 Expressway

== Costa Rica ==
- National Route 5

== Czech Republic ==
- D5 Motorway

== Djibouti ==
- RN-5 (Djibouti)

== Dominican Republic ==
- DR-5

== Finland ==
- Finnish national road 5 (Vt5)

== Germany ==
- Bundesautobahn 5 (A5)
- Bundesstraße 5 (B5)

== Greece ==
- A5 motorway (Ionia Odos)
- EO5 road

== Honduras ==
- CA-5 (Honduras)

== Hong Kong ==
- Route 5 (Hong Kong)

== Hungary ==
- M5 motorway (Hungary)
- Main road 5 (Hungary)

== India ==
- SH 5
- NH 5

== Indonesia ==
- Indonesian National Route 5

== Iran ==
- Freeway 5 (Iran)

== Iraq ==
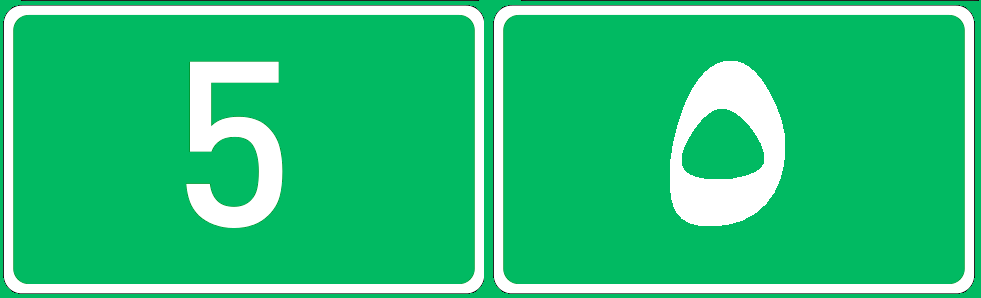
- Highway 5 (Iraq)

== Ireland ==
- N5 road (Ireland)

== Israel ==
- Highway 5 (Israel)

== Italy ==
- Autostrada A5
- RA 5

== Japan ==
- National Route 5
- Dō-Ō Expressway
- Bayshore Route (Port of Osaka-Kobe)
- Route 5 (Nagoya Expressway)

== Jordan ==
- Highway 5

== Korea, South ==
- National Route 5

== Malaysia ==
- FT 5 Malaysia Federal Route 5
- Shah Alam Expressway
- B5 Selangor State Route B5 (Jalan Dato' Mohd Sidin, Jalan Jambatan Connaught)
- J5 Johor Bahru East Coast Parkway
- N5 Negeri Sembilan State Route N5

== New Zealand ==
- State Highway 5 (New Zealand)

== Nigeria ==
- A5 highway (Nigeria)

== Paraguay ==
- National Route 5

== Philippines ==
- C-5 Circumferential Road 5
- R-5 Radial Road 5
- N5 highway (Philippines)
- E5 expressway (Philippines)

== Republic of the Congo ==
- National Highway 5 (Republic of the Congo)

== Romania ==
- Drumul Naţional 5

== Russia ==
- M5 highway (Russia)

== Syria ==
- M5 Motorway (Syria)

== Taiwan ==
- National Freeway 5
- Provincial Highway 5 (Taiwan)

== Thailand ==
- / Motorway 5

== Ukraine ==
- Highway M05 (Ukraine)

== United Kingdom ==
- M5 motorway (Great Britain)
- A5 road (Great Britain)
- A5 road (Isle of Man)
- M5 motorway (Northern Ireland)
- A5 road (Northern Ireland)

== United States ==
- Interstate 5
  - Interstate 5W (former)
  - Interstate 5E (former)
  - Interstate 5 Business (multiple highways)
- U.S. Route 5
- New England Interstate Route 5 (former)
- Alabama State Route 5
  - County Route 5 (Lee County, Alabama)
- Alaska Route 5
- Arkansas Highway 5
- California State Route 5 (former)
  - County Route A5 (California)
  - County Route D5 (California)
  - County Route E5 (California)
  - County Route G5 (California)
  - County Route J5 (California)
  - County Route N5 (California)
  - County Route S5 (California)
- Colorado State Highway 5
- Delaware Route 5
- Florida State Road 5
- Georgia State Route 5
- Idaho State Highway 5
- Illinois Route 5
- Indiana State Road 5
- Iowa Highway 5
- K-5 (Kansas highway)
- Kentucky Route 5
- Louisiana Highway 5
- Maine State Route 5
- Maryland Route 5
- M-5 (Michigan highway)
- Minnesota State Highway 5
  - County Road 5 (Dakota County, Minnesota)
  - County Road 5 (Goodhue County, Minnesota)
  - County Road 5 (Hennepin County, Minnesota)
  - County Road 5 (Washington County, Minnesota)
- Mississippi Highway 5
- Missouri Route 5
- Montana Highway 5
- Nebraska Highway 5
- Nevada State Route 5 (former)
  - Nevada State Route 5C (former)
- New Jersey Route 5
  - New Jersey Route 5N (former)
  - County Route 5 (Monmouth County, New Jersey)
- New York State Route 5
  - County Route 5 (Allegany County, New York)
  - County Route 5 (Broome County, New York)
  - County Route 5 (Cattaraugus County, New York)
  - County Route 5 (Chemung County, New York)
  - County Route 5 (Chenango County, New York)
  - County Route 5 (Clinton County, New York)
  - County Route 5 (Dutchess County, New York)
  - County Route 5 (Franklin County, New York)
  - County Route 5 (Jefferson County, New York)
  - County Route 5 (Niagara County, New York)
  - County Route 5 (Oneida County, New York)
  - County Route 5 (Ontario County, New York)
  - County Route 5 (Otsego County, New York)
  - County Route 5 (Rensselaer County, New York)
  - County Route 5 (Rockland County, New York)
  - County Route 5 (Schoharie County, New York)
  - County Route 5 (Steuben County, New York)
  - County Route 5 (Suffolk County, New York)
  - County Route 5 (Tioga County, New York)
  - County Route 5 (Ulster County, New York)
  - County Route 5 (Westchester County, New York)
  - County Route 5 (Wyoming County, New York)
- North Carolina Highway 5
- North Dakota Highway 5
- Ohio State Route 5
- Oklahoma State Highway 5
  - Oklahoma State Highway 5C
- Pennsylvania Route 5
- Rhode Island Route 5
- South Carolina Highway 5
- Tennessee State Route 5
- Texas State Highway 5
  - Texas State Highway Loop 5
  - Texas State Highway Spur 5
  - Texas Farm to Market Road
  - Texas Park Road 5
  - Texas Recreational Road 5 (former)
- Either of two prior designations for highways in Utah
  - Utah State Route 5 (1962-1977), the former state designation for Interstate 215
  - Utah State Route 5 (1910-1962), a former state highway in Weber and Summit counties that, for a time, also included parts of Interstate 80N (Interstate 84)
- Vermont Route F-5
- Virginia State Route 5
- West Virginia Route 5

Territories

- American Samoa Highway 005
- Guam Highway 5
- Puerto Rico Highway 5

== Uruguay ==
- Route 5 Gral. Fructuoso Rivera

== Zambia ==
- T5 road (Zambia)
- M5 road (Zambia)

== See also ==
- List of A5 roads
- List of N5 roads
- List of highways numbered 5A
- List of highways numbered 5B

Preceded by 4	Lists of highways 5	Succeeded by 6
