= List of highways numbered 5B =

The following highways are numbered 5B:

== United States ==
- Nevada State Route 5B (former)
- New York State Route 5B
- Oklahoma State Highway 5B

== See also ==
- List of highways numbered 5
