= List of N5 roads =

This is a list of roads designated N5. Roads entries are sorted in alphabetical order by country.

- N5 (Bangladesh), a Bangladeshi national highway connecting the capital Dhaka and the town of Banglabandha
- N5 road (Belgium), a road connecting Brussels and Philippeville
- N5 road (Democratic Republic of the Congo), a road connecting Bukavu and Uvira
- N5 road (France), a road connecting Dijon and the frontier of Switzerland
- N5 road (Gabon), a road connecting Kougouleu and Bibasse
- N5 road (Ghana), a road connecting Adam and Ho
- N5 road (Ireland), a road connecting Dublin (via the N4) and Westport
- N5 road (Luxembourg)
- N5 road (Oman), a road connecting Muscat and al Batinah.
- N5 highway (Pakistan), a road connecting Karachi and Torkham
- N5 highway (Philippines)
- N5 (Portugal), a road in Portugal
- N5 road (Senegal)
- N5 (South Africa), a road connecting Harrismith and Winburg
- N5 road (Switzerland)
- Nebraska Highway 5, a state highway in the U.S. state of Nebraska

== See also ==
- List of highways numbered 5
