= Taman Berkeley =

Berkeley
- Township
- Location within Malaysia
- Coordinates: 3°3′28.4″N 101°27′53.8″E
- Country: Malaysia
- State: Selangor
- District: Klang

Government
  - Local Authority: Klang Royal City Council
  - Mayor: Datin Paduka Noraini Roslan
- Time zone: UTC+8 (MST)
- Postcode: 41150
- Dialling code: +60 33
- Police: Bandar Baru Klang

Berkeley is an old established township in Klang, Selangor, Malaysia. In the 1970s, Paramount Property Development Sdn Bhd developed one of the earliest housing estates in Klang, Taman Berkeley.

== Background ==
Before it got its name of Berkeley, it was used to be known as "Taman Bukit Raja" in the early-1970s to the 1980s before having a change in its name. Berkeley Garden's township location is just adjacent to another old township, Taman Eng Ann & the newer township, Bandar Baru Klang (BBK) where most of the business areas & retail outlets including the AEON Bukit Raja Shopping Centre (Bandar Baru Klang) are situated.

== Cuisine ==
Berkeley is famous for its food such as fried porridge, claypot chicken rice, mee hoon kueh and bak kut teh.

== Transportation ==
Berkeley is located near the Federal Highway. The township was to be served by the planned BRT Federal Line's Berkeley station once the project starts its operation in 2018. However, the BRT project was shelved indefinitely following government's plan to build the Bandar Utama-Klang LRT line.
