= Bandar Baru Klang =

Coordinates: 3°3′45.87339″N 101°28′8.0955″E

- Township
- Nickname: BBK
- Motto: The 21st Century Integrated Township
- Location within Malaysia
- Country: Malaysia
- State: Selangor
- District: Klang

Government
  - Local Authority: Majlis Bandaraya Diraja Klang
  - Yang Dipertua: Mohammad Bin Yacob
- Time zone: UTC+8 (MST)
- Postcode: 41150
- Dialling code: +60 33
- Police: Klang Newtown

Bandar Baru Klang (literal translation: Klang New Town) is a modern township located 2 km away from the Klang town centre in the state of Selangor, Malaysia. Bandar Baru Klang is developed by the Acmar Group. The township falls under the jurisdiction of the Klang Royal City Council, MBDK (formerly Klang Municipal Council, MPK).

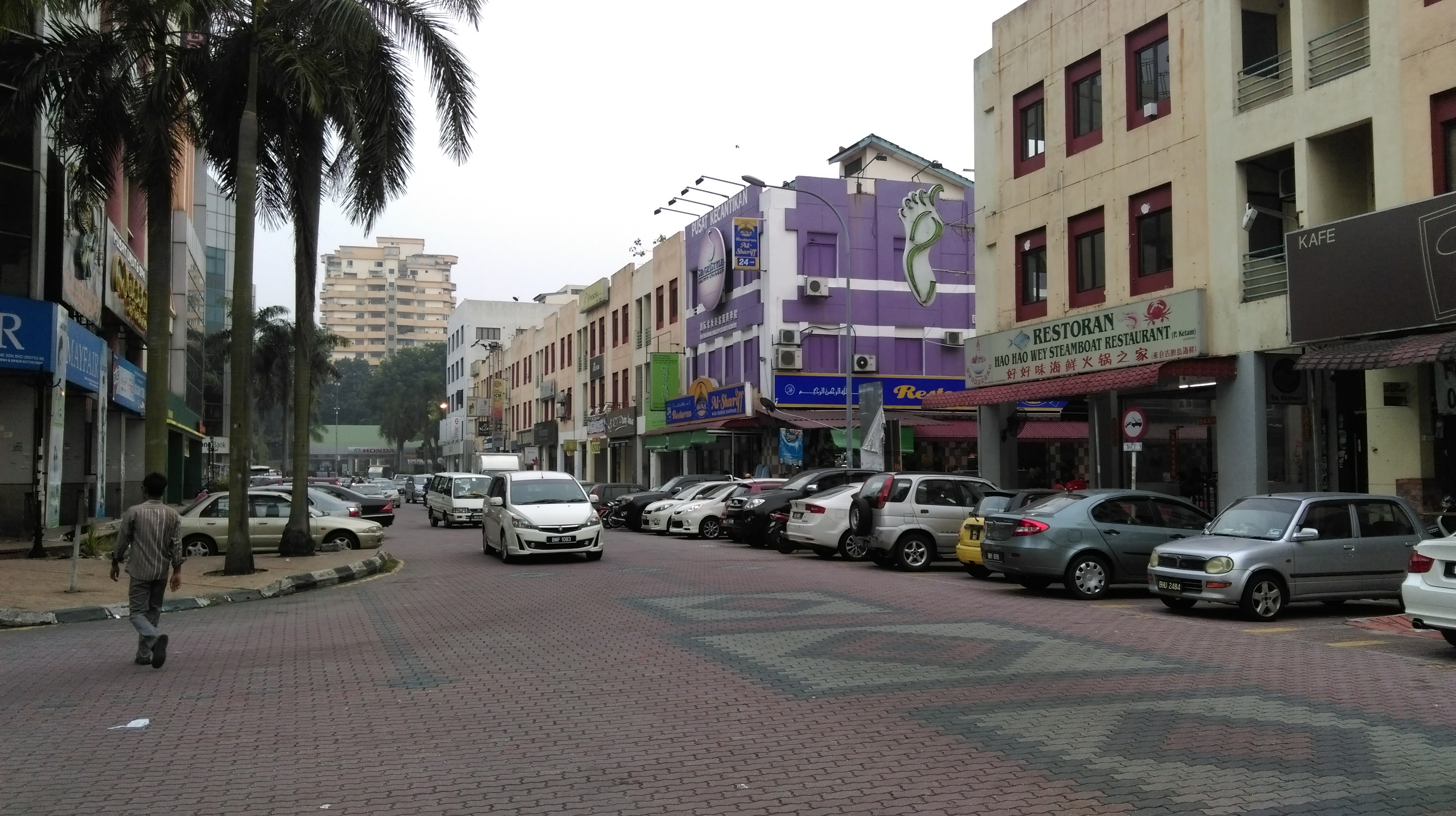
A section of Bandar Baru Klang seen from Jalan Tiara 4

== Connectivity ==
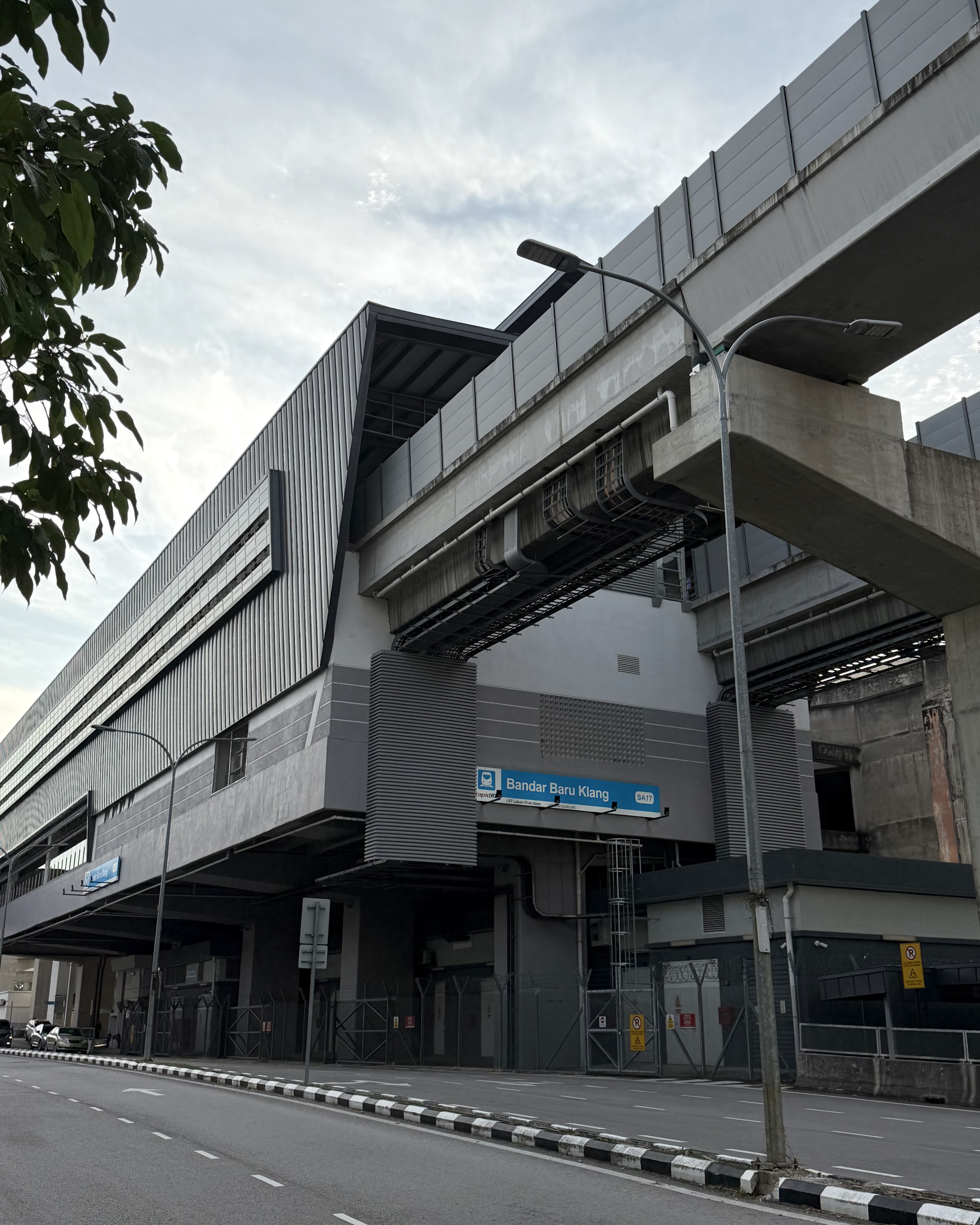
The Bandar Baru Klang LRT station, as seen from the BBK Heights sidewalk

Bandar Baru Klang is well connected to and from various highways including the Federal Highway, North Klang Straits Bypass, New North Klang Straits Bypass (also known as Lebuhraya Grand Sepadu), West Coast Expressway, the New Klang Valley Expressway (NKVE) via North Klang Straits Bypass, and is also accessible via FT 3217 (Jalan Meru) from the city centre and connected directly via the Jalan Pekan Baru and Persiaran Rajawali road interjunctions.

The township is also served by the Bandar Baru Klang LRT station (known interimly as Bukit Raja staion), a 37.8-kilometer light rapid transit (LRT) extension to the western corridor of Klang Valley under the Shah Alam Line. The line went through numerous operational delays, before finally opening public passenger services on 29 June 2026. The station is situated on Persiaran Bukit Raja nearby the entrance of BBK Heights, the town's business park, and right beside an abandoned building.

== Politics ==
Bandar Baru Klang is represented in the Parliament by the Member of Parliament for Shah Alam, Khalid Abd Samad. In the State Assembly of Selangor, the township is represented by Mohd Najwan Halimi, the state assemblyman for Kota Anggerik.

== Facilities ==
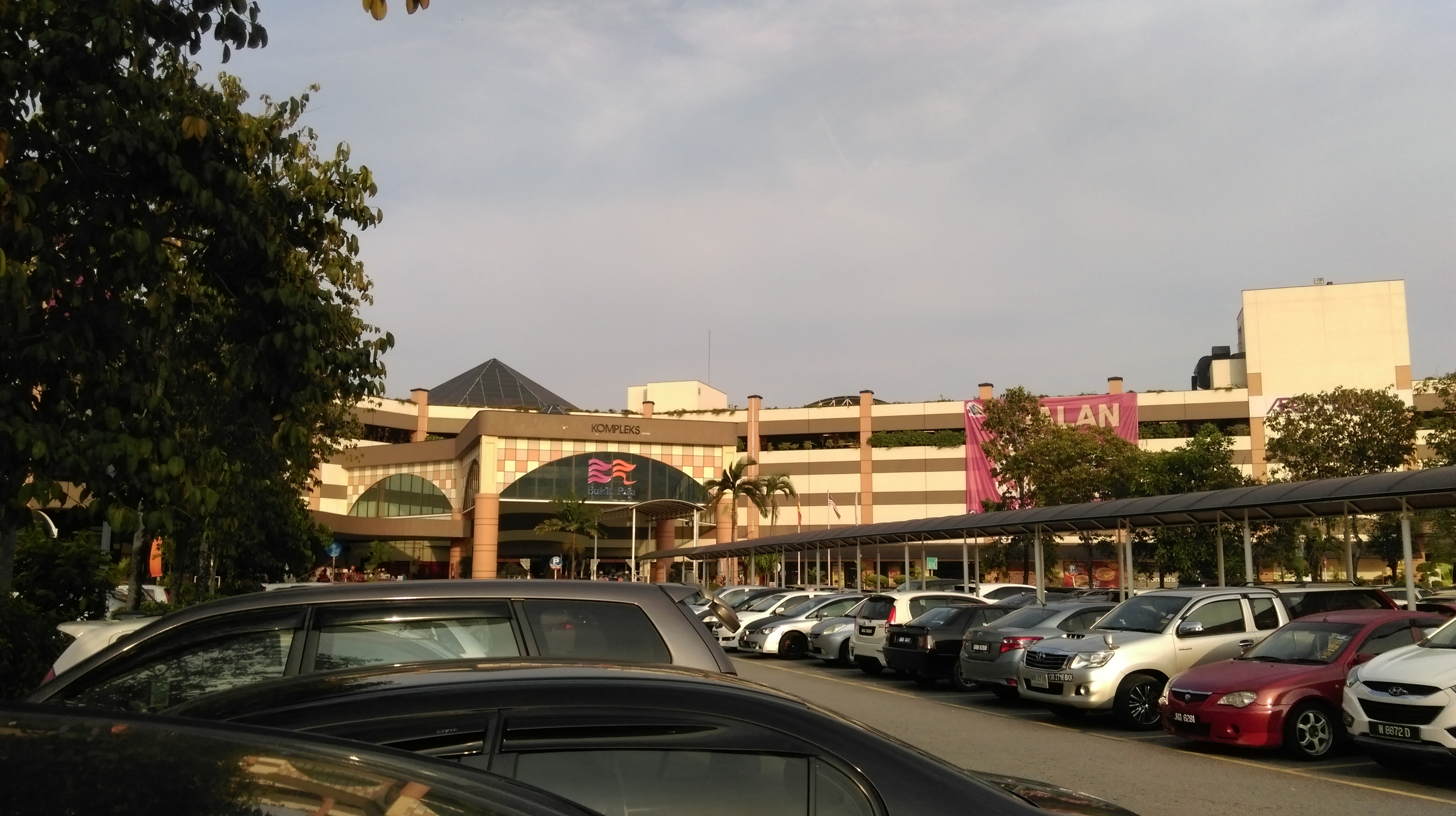
AEON Bukit Raja Shopping Centre, Bandar Baru Klang.

=== Hotels ===
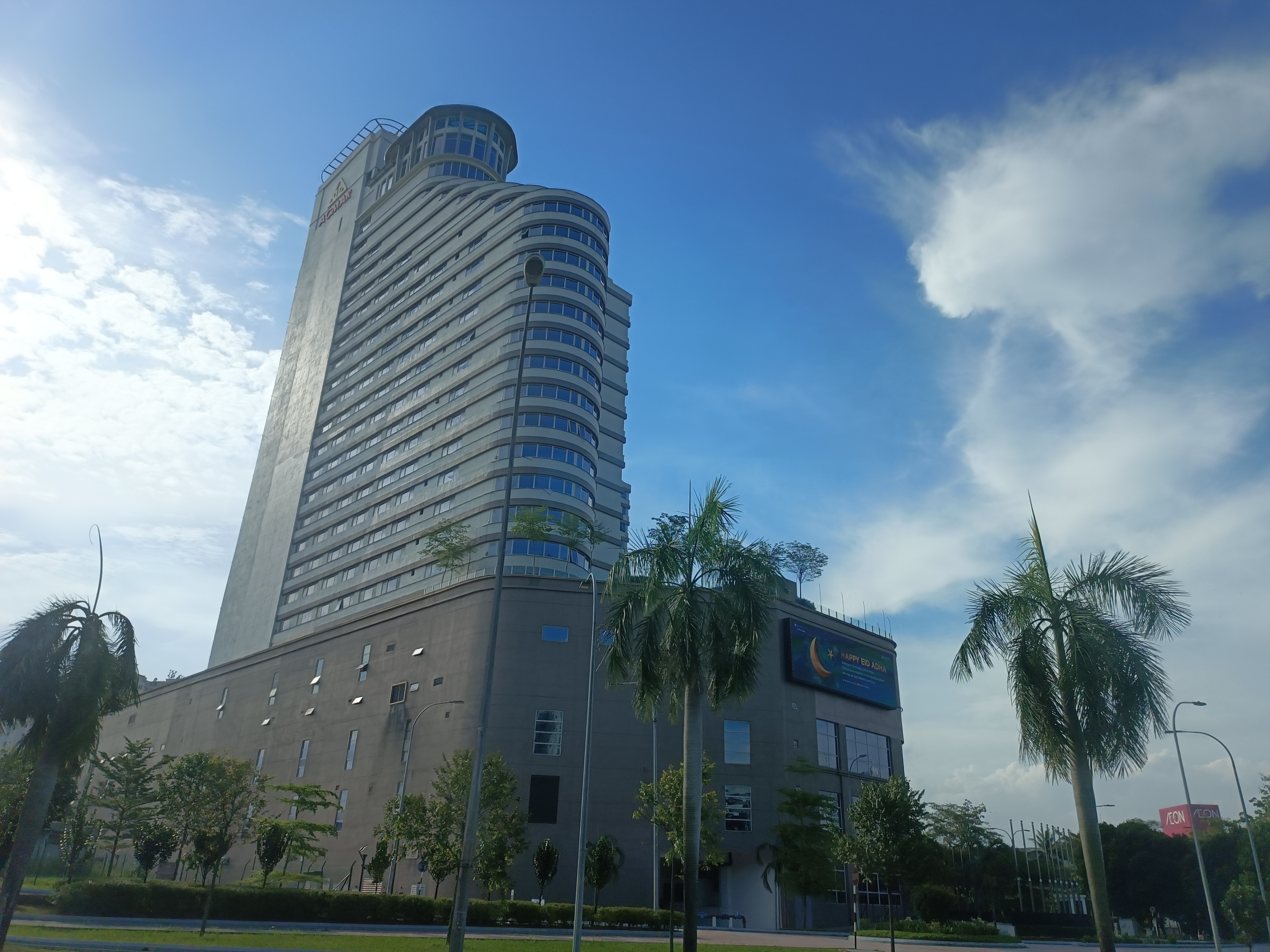
The Wyndham Acmar Klang, as seen from Selat Klang Highway-Federal Highway junction.

The 488-room Wyndham Acmar Klang is the first upscale international hotel in Klang. The construction of the hotel was halted in 1997 due to the Asian Financial Crisis, and was resumed in 2015.

The hotel opened in January 2020 and is located next to AEON Bukit Raja Shopping Centre .

=== Healthcare ===
The KPJ Klang Specialist Hospital, a tertiary care hospital is located in the township.

=== Shopping ===
There is one shopping centre in the township, namely the AEON Bukit Raja Shopping Centre.

=== Education ===
Sekolah Sri Acmar; a private primary and secondary school is located at Persiaran Rajawali. An international school, Acmar International School is slated to open in June 2018.

=== Government Offices ===
The office of the Selangor Department Of Director General Of Lands And Mines (Federal) as well as Federal Offices Complex are located on Persiaran Bukit Raja 1.

=== Sports and Recreation ===
Klang Executive Club and U One Sports Centre are located within the township.
