= North Klang Straits Bypass =

Road in Malaysia

Federal Route 20
- North Klang Straits Bypass

Route information
- Part of AH141 ( New North Klang Straits Bypass)
- Maintained by Grand Sepadu Sdn Bhd (formerly known as Lebuhraya Shapadu Sdn Bhd (LSSB))
- Length: 15.1 km (9.4 mi)
- Existed: 1983–present
- History: Completed on 1985

Major junctions
- Northwest end: Northport, Port Klang
- FT 103 Northport Highway New North Klang Straits Bypass / AH141; FT 5 Federal Route 5 FT 3217 Federal Route 3217 New Klang Valley Expressway / AH141; FT 2 Federal Highway; FT 3216 Jalan Batu Tiga Lama
- Southeast end: Sungai Rasau

Location
- Country: Malaysia
- Primary destinations: Kapar, Klang, Bukit Raja

Highway system
- Highways in Malaysia; Expressways; Federal; State

North Klang Straits Bypass, Federal Route 20, AH 141, is the main highway bypass to Port Klang in Klang, Selangor, Malaysia. Federal Route 20 became the backbone of the road system linking Sungai Rasau to Port Klang before being surpassed by E30 New North Klang Straits Bypass. Many cargo trucks travel along the highway daily.

== Route background ==
The Kilometre Zero of the Federal Route 20 starts at Northport Interchange near Port Klang.

== History ==
The plan to build the bypass to Port Klang began in the late 1970s. Construction began in 1983 and completed on 1 January 1985. Today this highway are maintained by the Lebuhraya Shapadu Sdn Bhd (a member of Shapadu Corporation Sdn Bhd) and Malaysian Public Works Department (JKR). By the 1990s to 2000s, the highway was bogged down with severe congestion, and the present New North Klang Straits Bypass was built to replace it. On 2009, the Port Klang toll plaza was closed and the parts of Jalan Kapar–Port Klang sections became a toll free highway.

In 2014, the expressway was taken over to LGB Group and its name was changed to Grand Sepadu Sdn Bhd.

== Features ==
- Two-lane carriageway
- Emergency lane
- Toll
- Speed trap
- Variable Message Sign (VMS)
- Many container trucks along this highway
- Many kampungs (village) along this highway
- Massive accident area along this highway
- Many traffic lights along this highway

At most sections, the Federal Route 20 was built under the JKR R5 road standard, with a speed limit of 90 km/h (56 mph).

There are no alternate routes or sections with motorcycle lanes.

=== Overlaps ===
Route number	Route name	Section
New North Klang Straits Bypass		Northport, Port Klang–Port Klang toll plaza
New North Klang Straits Bypass		Bukit Raja toll plaza–Sungai Rasau

== Criticisms ==
=== Accident area near school ===
The bypass is not considered safe because of many accidents involving heavy vehicles along this road, especially the area around a school. On 18 May 2005, on Teacher's Day, a seven-year-old girl from Sekolah Rendah Agama Rantau Panjang religious school Nur Salina Saparedi was knocked by a lorry while she was crossing this road.

(Source: The Star, 19 May 2005)

== Toll rates ==
=== Bukit Raja toll plaza ===
Class	Type of vehicle	Rate (in Malaysian ringgit (RM))
0	Motorcycles, bicycles or vehicles with 2 or less wheels	Free
1	Vehicles with 2 axles and 3 or 4 wheels excluding taxis	RM0.60
2	Vehicles with 2 axles and 5 or 6 wheels excluding buses	RM1.00
3	Vehicles with 3 or more axles	RM1.00
4	Taxis	RM0.50
5	Buses	RM1.00

== Interchange lists ==
The entire route is located in Klang District, Selangor.

Legend:

- I/C - Interchange, I/S - Intersection, RSA - Rest and service area, OBR - Overhead bridge restaurant, R/R - Restaurant and rest plaza, L/B - Layby, V/P - Vista point, TN - tunnel, T/P - Toll plaza, BR - Bridge
- C - Cloverleaf, S - Stack, T-A - Trumpet-A, T-B - Trumpet-B, DT - Directional-T/Y, SDT - Semi-Directional-T/Y, P-Y - Partial-Y, D - Diamond, P-C - Partial cloverleaf, D-D - Diverging diamond, D-R - Direct ramp

km			Exit	Name	Destinations	Notes
E30	AH141	FT20	Exit	Name	Destinations	Notes
0.0–4.0				North Port–North Klang	see also New North Klang Straits Bypass / AH141	
—N/a			2008	North Klang I/C	New North Klang Straits Bypass / AH141 – Kuala Lumpur, Shah Alam, Kapar	Half Trumpet Interchange; From FT20 Northport Only
—N/a				Former Port Klang Toll Plaza location		
—N/a			BR	Sungai Che Wang bridge		
—N/a			2007	Kampung Rantau Panjang I/C	Jalan Kampung Rantau Panjang – Kampung Rantau Panjang	T-junctions
—N/a				Jalan Goh Hock Huat	Jalan Goh Hock Huat – Klang	Junctions
—N/a		9.0	L/B	Shell L/B	Shell	
—N/a		9.2	2006	Jalan Kapar I/C	FT 5 Jalan Kapar – Kapar, Kuala Selangor, Teluk Intan, Klang	Junctions
—N/a				Jalan Sungai Putus	Jalan Sungai Putus	Junctions
—N/a				Jalan Labis 65	Jalan Labis 65	T-junctions
—N/a				Jalan Istimewa	Jalan Istimewa	T-junctions
—N/a				Taman Sentosa, Klang		
—N/a				Sirajuddin Al-Anuar Mosque		
—N/a				SK Batu Belah	Sekolah Kebangsaan Batu Belah	
—N/a				Kampung Batu Belah	Jalan Bahagia – Kampung Batu Belah, Jalan Haji Sirat, Taman Sentosa	Junctions
—N/a		11.0	2005	Jalan Meru I/C	FT 3217 Malaysia Federal Route 3217 – Meru, Bestari Jaya (Batang Berjuntai), Puncak Alam, Setia Alam, Klang	Diamond interchange
—N/a				Bukit Raja North Toll Plaza	Touch 'n Go SmartTAG MyRFID	
15.0		12.0	2004	Bukit Raja North I/C	New North Klang Straits Bypass / AH141 – Port Klang, Kapar	Half Trumpet Interchange; From FH2 Federal Highway Only
				Bukit Raja North–Bukit Raja	see also New North Klang Straits Bypass / AH141	
17.0	—N/a	14.0	2001B	Lebuh Keluli Exit	Lebuh Keluli – Bukit Raja Industrial Area (South), Section 7 Shah Alam	Sungai Rasau bound LILO
	—N/a		2001A	Bandar Baru Klang Exit	Persiaran Bukit Raja – Bandar Baru Klang, Bukit Raja Shopping Centre	Port Klang bound LILO
	—N/a		I/C	Sungai Rasau I/C	FT 2 Federal Highway – Klang, Shah Alam, Kuala Lumpur	Diamond interchange
	—N/a		I/S	Sungai Rasau I/S	FT 3216 Jalan Batu Tiga Lama – Padang Jawa, Klang	T-junctions

== See also ==
- E30 New North Klang Straits Bypass
