= Tanjung Harapan, Port Klang =

Settlement in Malaysia

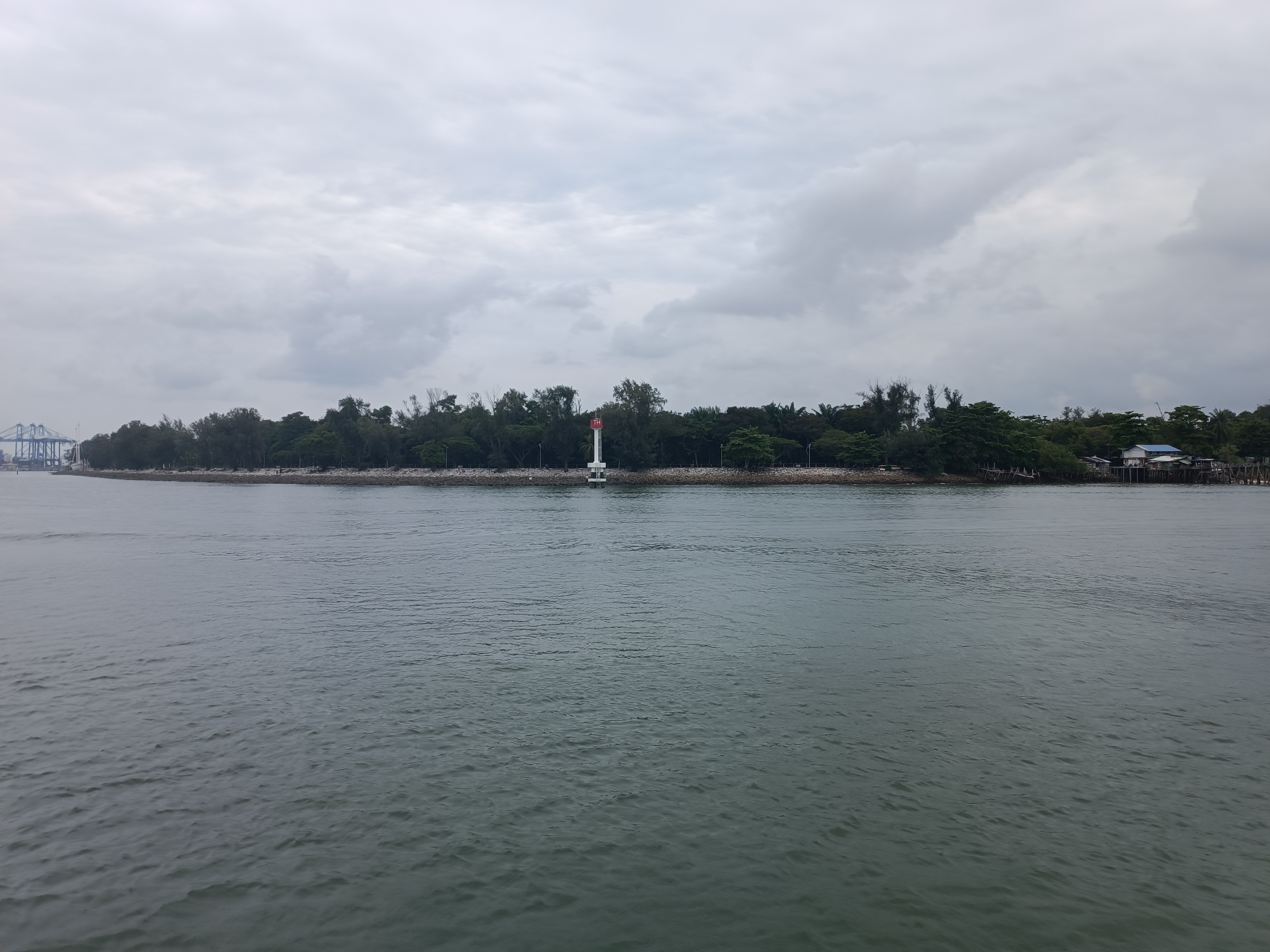

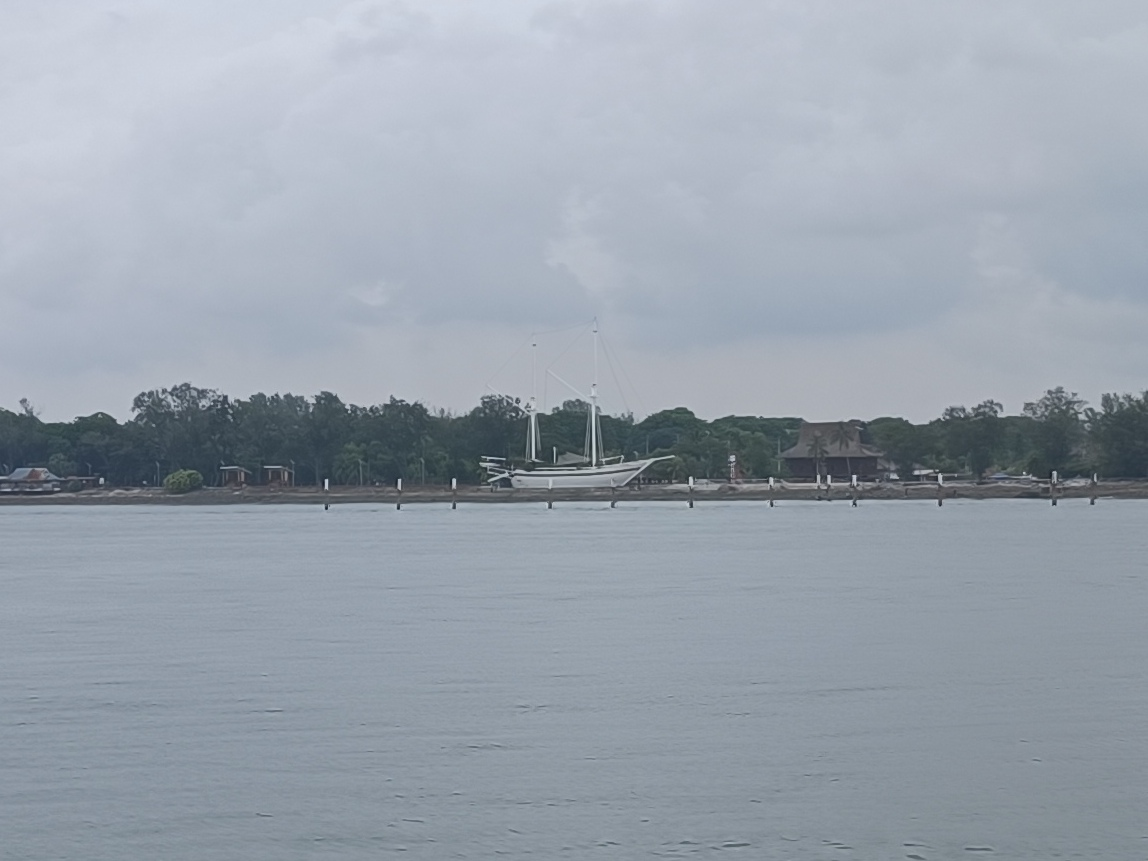

Tanjung Harapan is a tourist attraction in Selangor. It is located near the Northport in Port Klang.
