= Bandar Sultan Suleiman =

Human settlement in Malaysia

Coordinates: 3.0311°N 101.3853°E

Bandar Sultan Suleiman is an industrial zone and residential hub in Port Klang, Selangor, Malaysia located near Northport.
