= M19 expressway (Hungary) =

Road in Hungary

M19 expressway
- M19-es autóút
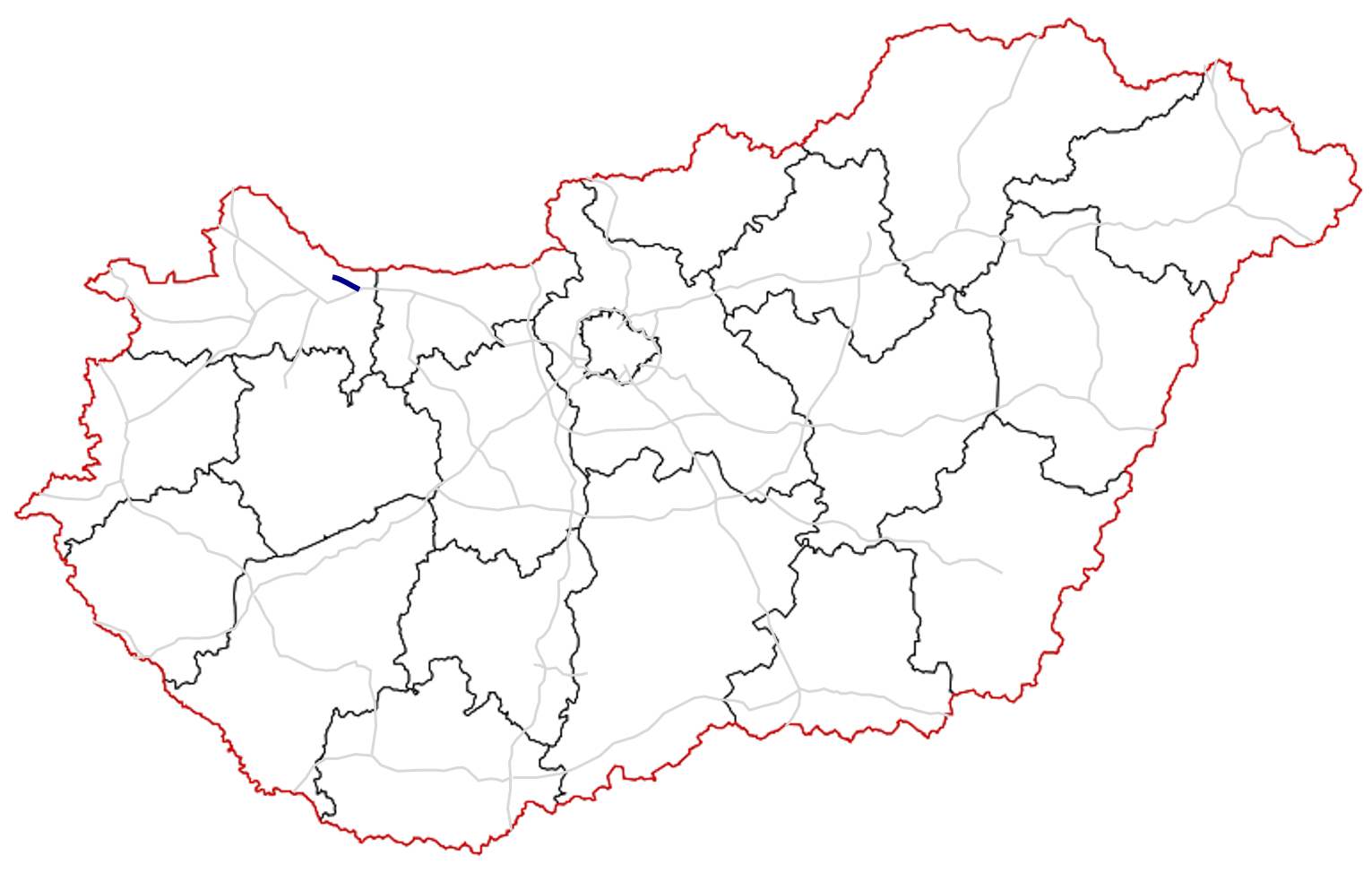
- in use other highways

Route information
- Length: 10 km (6.2 mi)
- Existed: 1975–present

Major junctions
- From: M1 in Győr-kelet
- 813 near Győrszentiván
- To: 1 in Győr

Location
- Country: Hungary
- Counties: Győr-Moson-Sopron
- Major cities: Győr

Highway system
- Roads in Hungary; Highways; Main roads; Local roads

The M19 expressway (Hungarian: M19-es autóút) is a short east–west highway in Hungary. It connects the M1 motorway to the city of Győr.

== Timeline ==
Section	Length	Opened	Notes
Győr kelet (M1) – Győr, Mártírok útja	10.0 km (6.21 mi)	Single carriageway: 1975	

== Route description ==
- The route profile is single carriage expressway. The maximum speed limit is 110km/h, with 2x1 lane road.

County	km	Type	Destination	Notes
Győr-Moson-Sopron	0	Interchange	M1 / E60 / E75 – Budapest M1 / E60 / E75 – Mosonmagyaróvár, towards to Vienna (A)	The eastern terminus of the carriageway. Kilometrage starting point trumpet interchange
Győr-Moson-Sopron	2	Bridge	over the Budapest–Hegyeshalom–Rajka railway line	
Győr-Moson-Sopron	6	Exit	Győr-Győrszentiván	
Győr-Moson-Sopron	8	Exit	813 / E575 – Győr-Audi factory / Main road 14 Vámosszabadi	Connection to Gönyű Port. Eastern bypass of Győr.
Győr-Moson-Sopron	10	Exit	Main road 1 – Győr-Centrum	The western terminus of the carriageway.
1.000 mi = 1.609 km; 1.000 km = 0.621 mi: Concurrency terminus; Incomplete access; Unopened

== Maintenance ==
The road is operated and maintained by Hungarian Public Road Nonprofit Pte Ltd Co. This activity is provided by this highway engineer.

- near Komárom (M1), kilometre trench 85

== Payment ==
Hungarian system has 2 main type in terms of salary:

1, time-based fee vignettes (E-matrica); with a validity of either 6,400 Hungarian forint (Ft) for 10 days, 10,360 Ft for 1 month and 57,260 Ft for a year, from 1 January 2024. 2, county vignettes (Megyei matrica); the highway can be used instead of the national sticker with the following county stickers:

Type of county vignette	Available section
Győr-Moson-Sopron	full length (0 km – 10 km)
Komárom-Esztergom	between M1 motorway junction and Győrszentiván (0 km – 6 km)

== See also ==
- Roads in Hungary
- Transport in Hungary
