= List of bridges in Slovakia =

This list of bridges in Slovakia lists bridges of particular historical, scenic, architectural or engineering interest. Road and railway bridges, viaducts, aqueducts and footbridges are included.

== Major road and railway bridges ==
This table presents the structures with spans greater than 100 meters (non-exhaustive list).

	Name	Slovak	Span	Length	Type	Carries Crosses	Opened	Location	County	Ref.
1	Most SNP	Nový most	303 m (994 ft)	432 m (1,417 ft)	Cable-stayed; Steel box girder deck, steel pylon 75+303+54	4 lanes road bridge Danube	1972	Bratislava; 48°08′17.7″N 17°06′16.4″E	Bratislava Region	
2	Monoštor Bridge	Most Monoštor	252 m (827 ft)	600 m (2,000 ft)	Cable-stayed; Steel girder deck, steel pylon	2 lanes road bridge Danube	2020	Komárno–Komárom; 47°45′23.5″N 18°05′04.9″E	Nitra; Hungary	
3	Apollo Bridge	Most Apollo	231 m (758 ft)	854 m (2,802 ft)	Arch; Steel tied arch Bow-string bridge	4 lanes road bridge Danube	2005	Bratislava; 48°08′15.3″N 17°07′41.3″E	Bratislava Region	
4	Lanfranconi Bridge	Most Lafranconi	174 m (571 ft)	1,134 m (3,720 ft)	Box girder Prestressed concrete 83+174+172+4x83	D2 motorway European route E65; Danube	1991	Bratislava; 48°08′32.4″N 17°04′31.0″E	Bratislava Region	
5	Vámosszabadi Bridge	Medveďovský Most	133 m (436 ft)	363 m (1,191 ft)	Truss; Steel; 114+133+114	I/13 road European route E575; 2 lanes Danube	1942	Medveďov–Vámosszabadi; 47°47′36.5″N 17°39′05.4″E	Trnava; Hungary	
6	Považská Bystrica Viaduct	Estakáda Považská Bystrica	122 m (400 ft)(x6)	958 m (3,143 ft)	Extradosed; Concrete box girder deck, 7 concrete pylons 71+6x122+68	D1 motorway European route E50; European route E75; Váh	2010	Považská Bystrica; 49°07′20.4″N 18°26′38.5″E	Region	
7	Mária Valéria Bridge	Most Márie Valérie	119 m (390 ft)	514 m (1,686 ft)	Truss; Steel; 85+102+119+102+85	I/63 road 2 lanes Danube	1895	Štúrovo–Esztergom; 47°47′43.0″N 18°43′47.6″E	Nitra; Hungary	
8	Komárom Railway Bridge		103 m (338 ft)	494 m (1,621 ft)	Truss; Steel; 4x103+82	Komárom–Nové Zámky railway Danube	1909	Komárno–Komárom; 47°45′24.2″N 18°05′13.2″E	Nitra; Hungary	
9	Elisabeth Bridge (Komárom)		102 m (335 ft)(x4)	411 m (1,348 ft)	Truss; Steel; 4x102	I/64 road 2 lanes Danube	1892	Komárno–Komárom; 47°45′04.9″N 18°07′15.5″E	Nitra; Hungary	
10	Prístavný most	Prístavný most			{{}}	Truss; Steel; Danube	1985	Bratislava; 48°08′04.5″N 17°08′22.8″E	Bratislava Region	

== Notes and references ==
- Nicolas Janberg. "International Database for Civil and Structural Engineering". Structurae.com.
- Others references

== See also ==
- List of bridges in Bratislava city
- List of crossings of the Danube
- Transport in Slovakia
- Highways in Slovakia
- Rail transport in Slovakia
- Geography of Slovakia
