= Main road 14 (Hungary) =

Road in Hungary

Main road 14
- 14-es főút
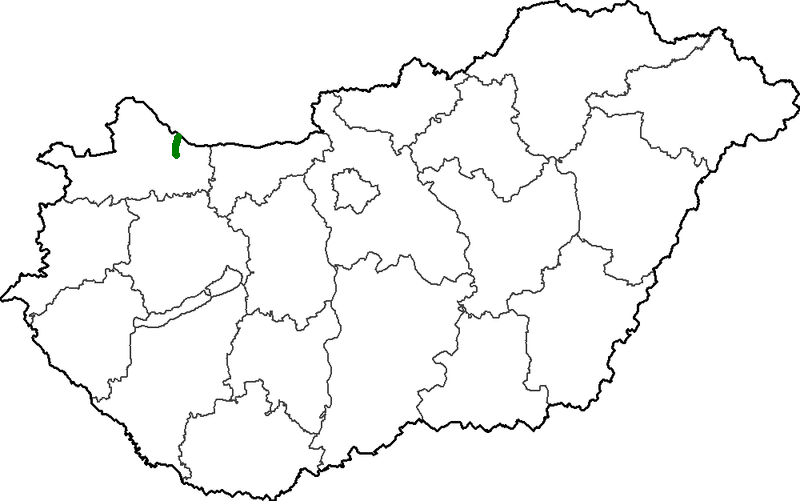

Route information
- Part of E575
- Length: 12.5 km (7.8 mi)

Major junctions
- From: 1, 81 in Győr
- 813 near Győr
- To: Vámosszabadi; I/13 border with Slovakia

Location
- Country: Hungary
- Counties: Győr-Moson-Sopron
- Major cities: Győr

Highway system
- Roads in Hungary; Highways; Main roads; Local roads

The Main road 14 (Hungarian: 14-es főút) is a south–north direction Secondary class main road in the Kisalföld, that connects the Main road 1 change to the border of Slovakia. The road is 12.5 kilometres (7.8 mi) long.

The road, as well as all other main roads in Hungary, is managed and maintained by Magyar Közút, state owned company.

== Road junctions and populated areas ==
Main road 14 junctions/populated areas/toll plazas
Type	Slip roads/Notes
	Győr, Árkád junction Main road 81 Connection to Kisbér and Székesfehérvár. The southern terminus of the road.
	Győr, Schwarzenberg u. / Vas Gerben u.
	Széchenyi Bridge (Mosoni-Duna)
	Győr, Szövetség u. / Bárka u. Győr, Bácsai út Side road 1301 to Nagybajcs. Győr, Zemplén u. / Körtöltés u.
	MOL petrol station
	Győr, Újfalusi országút Side road 1401 to Győrújfalu and Mosonmagyaróvár.
	Győr-kelet; Main road 813 towards to M1 motorway (Eastern bypass of Győr).
	Vámosszabadi; Side road 1303 to Nagybajcs.
	Vámosszabadi border crossing to Slovakia
	Danube; Route 13 to Medveďov, Slovakia. The northern terminus of the road.

== See also ==
- Roads in Hungary
