= Main road 83 (Hungary) =

Road in Hungary

Main road 83
- 83-as főút
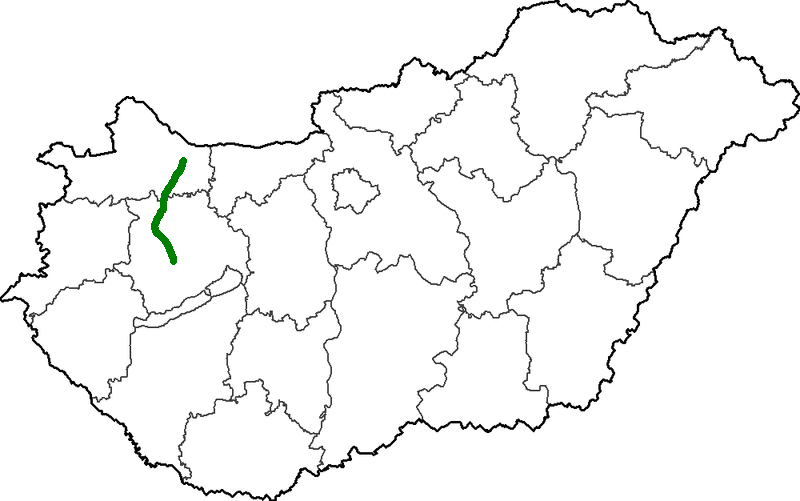

Route information
- Length: 76 km (47 mi)

Major junctions
- From: 8 near Városlőd
- 832, 834 in Pápa; M1 near Győr; 821 in Győr
- To: 82 in Győr

Location
- Country: Hungary
- Counties: Veszprém, Győr-Moson-Sopron
- Major cities: Pápa, Győr

Highway system
- Roads in Hungary; Highways; Main roads; Local roads

The Main road 83 (Hungarian: 83-as főút) is a south–north direction Secondary class main road in the Kisalföld, that connects the Main road 8 change to Main road 82. The road is 76 kilometres (47 mi) long.

The road, as well as all other main roads in Hungary, is managed and maintained by Magyar Közút, state owned company.

== Road junctions and populated areas ==
Main road 83 junctions/populated areas/toll plazas
Type	Slip roads/Notes
	Városlőd; Main road 8 Connection to Székesfehérvár or Szentgotthárd. The southern terminus of the road.
	Városlőd, Rudermajor
	Farkasgyepű
	Bakonyjákó; Side road 83122
	Side road 84102 to Ganna.
	Pápa-Tapolcafő
	Side road 8402 to Pápakovácsi and Devecser.
	Pápa; Main road 832 to Veszprémvarsány / Side road 8403 to Iszkáz. Main road 834 to Celldömölk and Sárvár.
	Győr–Celldömölk railway line
	Side road 8406 to Nagyacsád and Kenyeri.
	Pápa–Csorna railway line
	Pápa-Erzsébetváros; Side road 8305 to Gyarmat.
	Pápa-észak; Side road 8315 to Pápa. Side road 8314 to Győr-Gyirmót. (Old section of Main road 83); Side road 8408 to Szany. The southern terminus of double carriage road. From Pápa to the M1 motorway the route is double carriage roads.
Border of Veszprém and Győr-Moson-Sopron Counties
	Side road 8461 to Gyarmat or Csikvánd.
	Tét-dél; Side road 8306 to Tét or Gyömöre and Vanyola.
	Tét-észak; Side road 8314 to Tét or Győrszemere and Győr-Gyirmót. (Old section of Main road 83)
	Győrszemere; Side road 8308 to Kajárpéc
	Koroncó - Side road 8418
	Győr-Ménfőcsanak; Side road 8314. (Old section of Main road 83)
	Győr-Gyirmót, Ménfői u. / Győr-Ménfőcsanak, Új élet u. Győr-Gyirmót, Szent László u. / Győr-Ménfőcsanak, Malom u. Győr, Mérföldkő u.
	M1 motorway junction near Győr-Ménfőcsanak; Towards to Budapest (to the east) and to Hegyeshalom (to the west). The northern terminus of double carriage road.
	Győr; Győr, Királyszék u. Győr, Pápai u. / Királyszéki u. - Side road 83129 to Győrújbarát. Győr, Zemplén u. / Körtöltés u. Main road 821 to Győr-Centrum.
	Győr-Marcalváros; Main road 82 to Zirc and Veszprém.

== See also ==
- Roads in Hungary
