= Tarnalelesz =

- Village/község
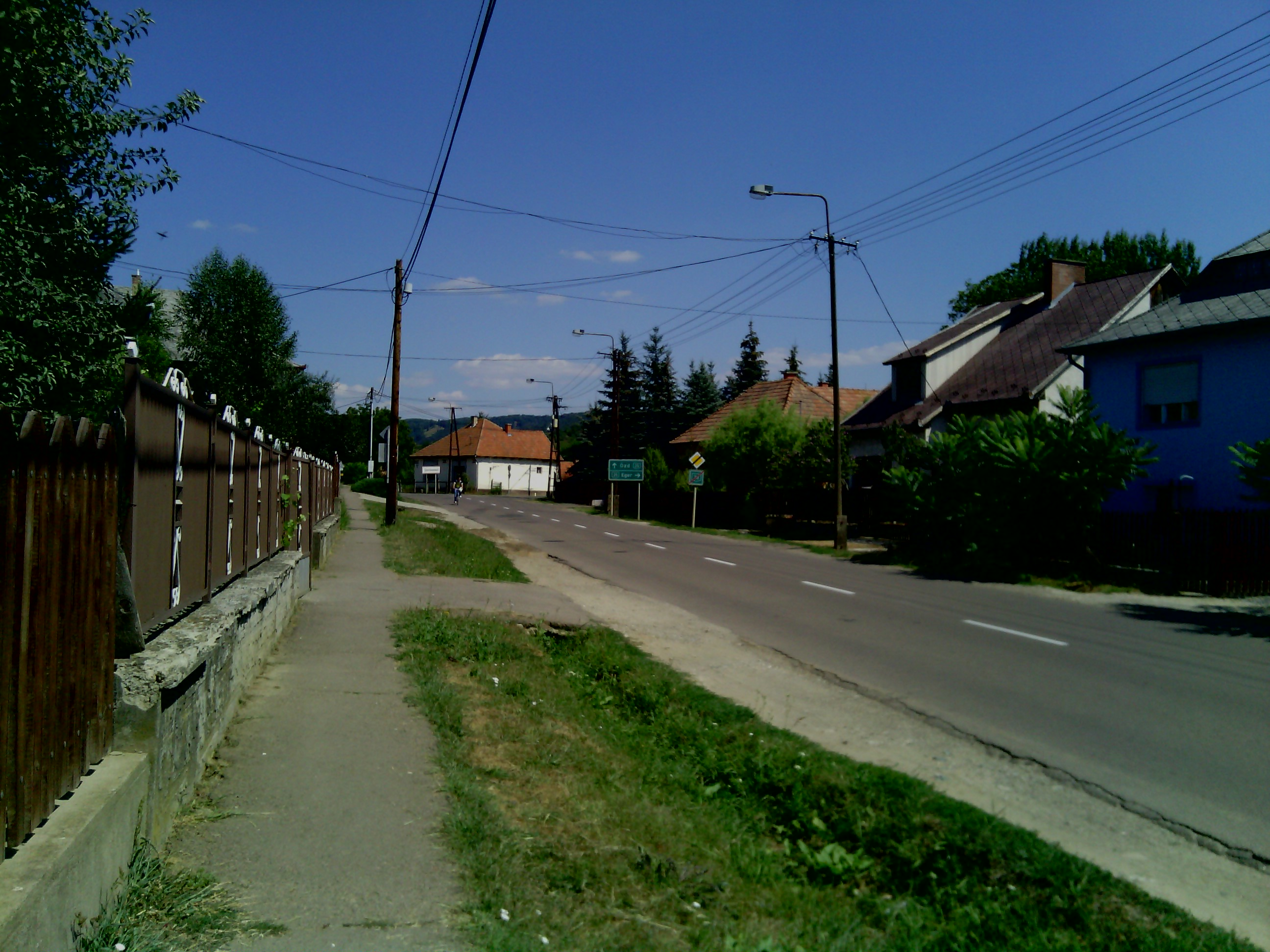
- Main street of Tarnalelesz

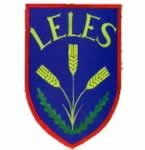
- Coat of arms

- Location of Heves County in Hungary

- Location within Hungary Location within Heves County
- Coordinates: 48°03′00″N 20°10′59″E
- Country: Hungary
- Region: Northern Hungary
- County: Heves County
- Subregion: Pétervására
- First mentioned: 1280

Government
  - Mayor: Passza Béla Kovács (FIDESZ-KDNP)

Area
  - Total: 28.26 km^{2} (10.91 sq mi)
- Elevation: 277 m (909 ft)

Population (2015)
  - Total: 1,785
  - Density: 45.08/km^{2} (116.8/sq mi)
- Time zone: UTC+1 (CET)
  - Summer (DST): UTC+2 (CEST)
- Postal code: 3258
- area code: 36
- Website: Tarnalelesz official website

Tarnalelesz is a village (község) in Heves County, Northern Hungary Region, Hungary.
