= Main road 13 (Hungary) =

Road in Hungary

Main road 13
- 13-as főút
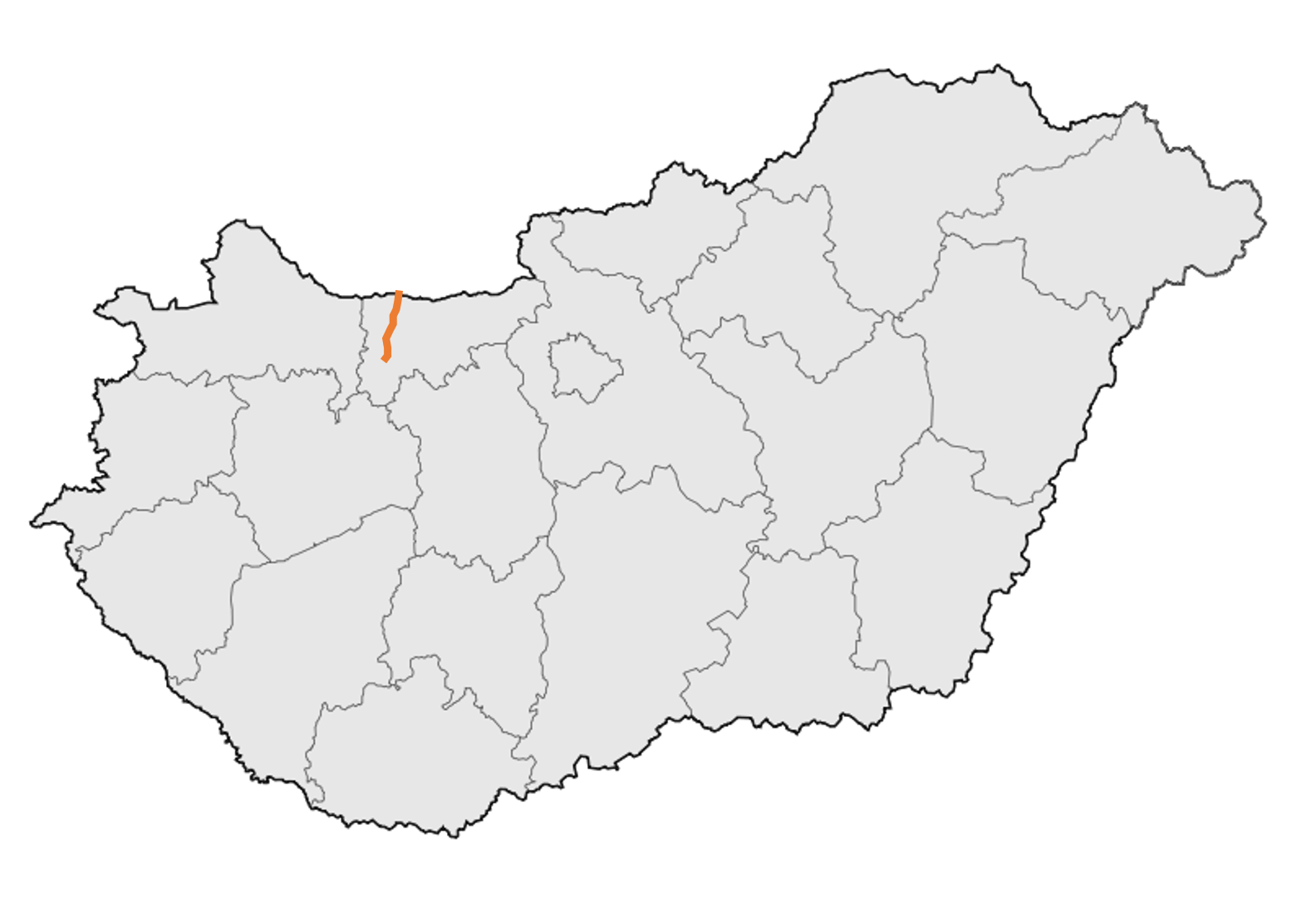

Route information
- Length: 29 km (18 mi)

Major junctions
- From: border with Slovakia I/64; Komárom
- To: 81 near Kisbér

Location
- Country: Hungary
- Counties: Komárom-Esztergom
- Major cities: Komárom, Kisbér

Highway system
- Roads in Hungary; Highways; Main roads; Local roads

The Main road 13 (Hungarian: 13-as főút) is a north–south direction Secondary class main road in the Kisalföld, that connects the border of Slovakia to the Main road 81. The road is 29 kilometres (18 mi) long.

The road, as well as all other main roads in Hungary, is managed and maintained by Magyar Közút, state owned company.

== Road junctions and populated areas ==
Main road 13 junctions/populated areas/toll plazas
Type	Slip roads/Notes
	Monostori Bridge (Danube); Route 64 to Komárno, Slovakia. The northern terminus of the road.
	Komárom border crossing to Slovakia
	Komárom; Main road 1 to Komárom, Budapest or Győr. Main road 132 to Komárom. (Old city section of Main road 13)
	Székesfehérvár–Komárom railway line
	Csém
	M1 motorway junction near Komárom; Towards to Budapest (to the east) and to Hegyeshalom (to the west).
	Kisigmánd; Side road 81136 to Nagyigmánd.
	Nagyigmánd; Side road 8136 to Tata or Győr. Side road 8144 to Szákszend.
	Csép; Side road 8148 to Tárkány.
	Ete
	Kisbér; Main road 81 to Győr or Székesfehérvár.

== See also ==
- Roads in Hungary
