= Szárliget =

- Location of Komárom-Esztergom county in Hungary

- Location of Szárliget
- Coordinates: 47.51745°N 18.49506°E
- Country: Hungary
- County: Komárom-Esztergom

Area
  - Total: 14.56 km^{2} (5.62 sq mi)

Population (2020)
  - Total: 2,540
  - Density: 163.05/km^{2} (422.3/sq mi)
- Time zone: UTC+1 (CET)
  - Summer (DST): UTC+2 (CEST)
- Postal code: 2067
- Area code: 34
- Motorways: M1
- Distance from Budapest: 50.4 km (31.3 mi) East

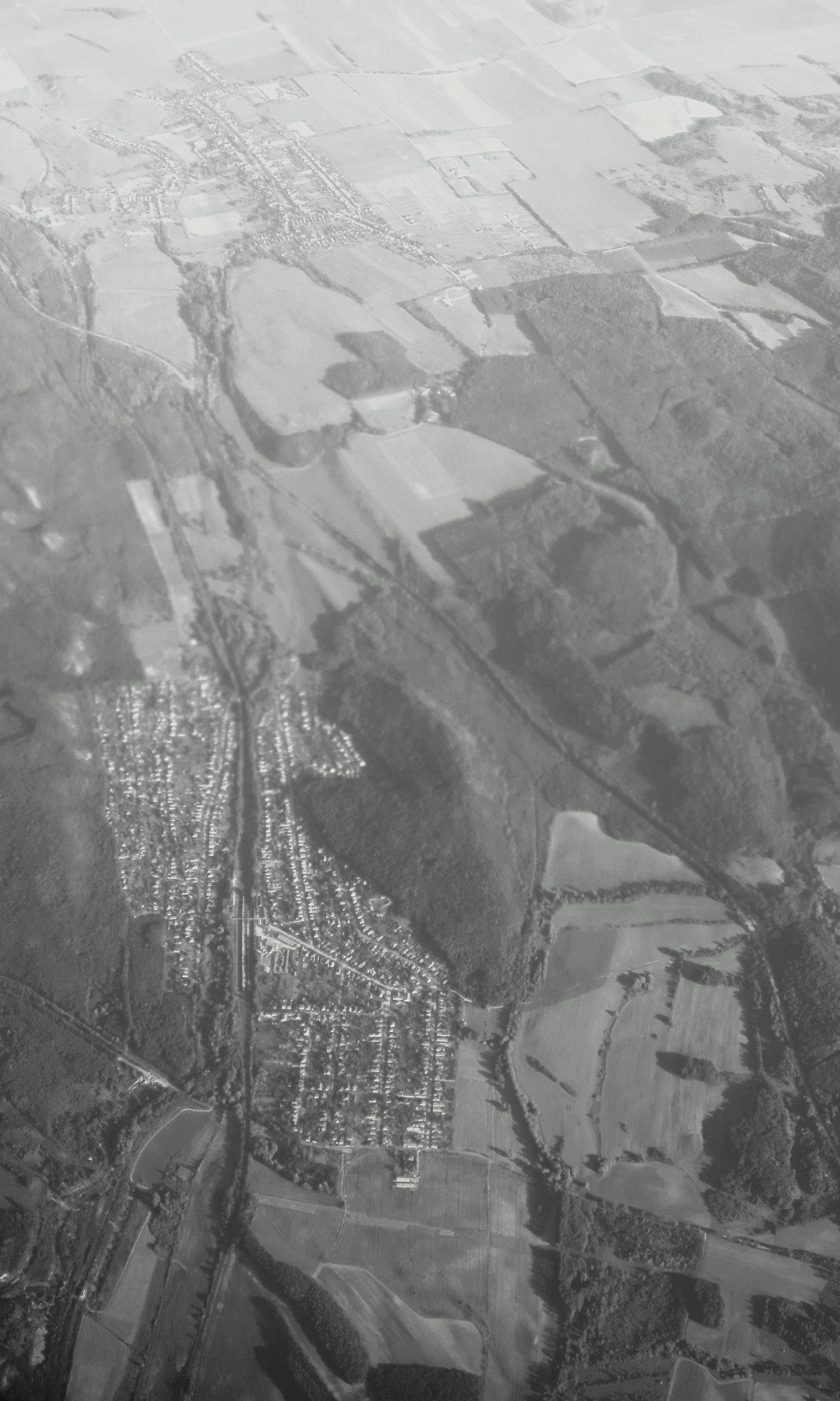
Aerial view of Szárliget village in Komárom-Esztergom county

Szárliget is a village in Komárom-Esztergom county, Hungary.
