= Balatonfűzfő =

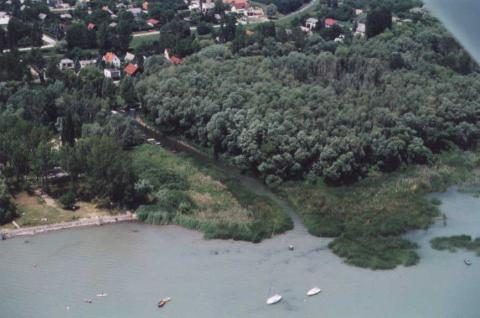

- Flag Coat of arms

- Location of Veszprém county in Hungary

- Location of Balatonfűzfő
- Coordinates: 47.06388°N 18.03904°E
- Country: Hungary
- County: Veszprém

Area
  - Total: 9.25 km^{2} (3.57 sq mi)

Population (2017)
  - Total: 4,262
  - Density: 461/km^{2} (1,190/sq mi)
- Time zone: UTC+1 (CET)
  - Summer (DST): UTC+2 (CEST)
- Postal code: 8175
- Area code: 88

Balatonfűzfő is a town at the northeastern corner of Lake Balaton in Hungary.

== History ==
The earliest settlements in the area were founded by the Celts, Avars and Romans. Material findings dating from the Middle Ages have been unearthed, which evidence the existence of settlements subsequently destroyedin the 17th century. The growth of the settlement accelerated in 1908 with the building of a railway line around Balaton. By 1920 the village had built its first paved roads, a post office, station, and beach, and started planting vineyards and distributing land. In 1927, the production of gunpowder began, stimulating the industrial population.

Balatonfűzfő has been a self-administrated settlement since 1958, a large village since 1970, an independent self-government since 1990, and a town since 2000.

== Sport ==
- Fűzfői AK, association football club
