= Bana, Hungary =

Bana
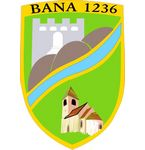
- Coat of arms

- Location of Komárom-Esztergom county in Hungary

- Location of Bana, Hungary
- Coordinates: 47.64986°N 17.92117°E
- Country: Hungary
- County: Komárom-Esztergom

Area
  - Total: 25.13 km^{2} (9.70 sq mi)

Population (2004)
  - Total: 1,752
  - Density: 69.71/km^{2} (180.5/sq mi)
- Time zone: UTC+1 (CET)
  - Summer (DST): UTC+2 (CEST)
- Postal code: 2944
- Area code: 34
- Motorways: M1
- Distance from Budapest: 100 km (62 mi) East

Bana is a village located in Komárom-Esztergom County, located in northwestern Hungary.

== Geography ==
It covers an area of 25.13 km^{2} (10 sq mi) and has a population of 1500 people (2025).

== History ==
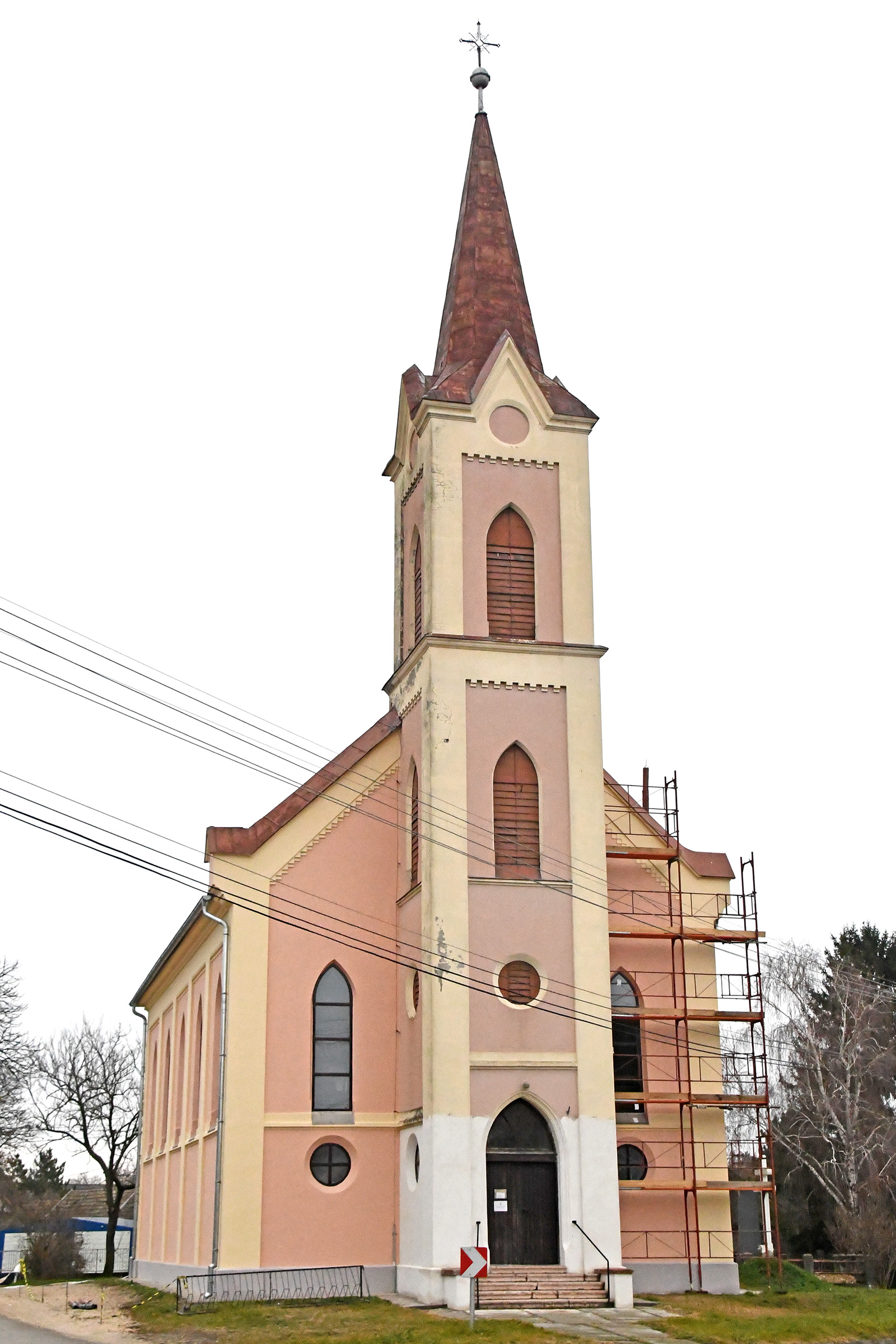
Roman Catholic church in Bana, Hungary

The first Hungarians settled in the area as early as the 10th century, where their richly decorated burials were discovered on the village outskirts.

It became a significant settlement in the Middle Ages, having its castle mentioned in the Chronicle of Anonymous. It became a seat of a royal county during the reign of the Árpád kings. During the Tatar invasion, the village and its castle was destroyed. In 1369, King Louis I donated it to Jakab, the son of Kolos Némai. In the 15th century, the Rozgonyi family and several noble families owned Bana, before it was destroyed by the Turks in 1529.

It was rebuilt by Reformed Hungarians in the 17th century. At the beginning of the century, it was still a small settlement. In 1631, it was only listed as a wasteland of the Szilágyi family. After 1643, the settlement of the Reformed families here became significant. Our first church was built in 1620 from wood, which burned down several times throughout history. The tower of the current Reformed church, built in 1788, was completed in 1858.

From the middle of the 18th century, Catholic Hungarian families also settled here in increasing numbers. The 1784-87 census lists the village as a noble estate, with a population of 844 at the time.

In 1809, Napoleon's armies marched through the settlement. In the 1840s, the state planted a strawberry garden on its border for the purpose of silk production. The border and the farming contributed to an increase in its population, and in 1848 there were already 1,229 people living in the village.
