= Main road 578 (Hungary) =

Road in Hungary

Main road 578
- 578-as főút
- Eastern bypass of Pécs

Route information
- Length: 8.846 km (5.497 mi)

Major junctions
- From: 6 in Újhegy
- 57 near Kozármisleny
- To: M60 in Pécs-kelet

Location
- Country: Hungary
- Counties: Baranya
- Major cities: Pécs, Kozármisleny

Highway system
- Roads in Hungary; Highways; Main roads; Local roads

The Main road 578 is a short bypass direction Secondary class main road near Pécs, that connects the Main road 6 to the M60 motorway's Pécs-kelet junction. The road is 8.8 kilometres (5.5 mi) long.

The road, as well as all other main roads in Hungary, is managed and maintained by Magyar Közút, state owned company.

== See also ==
- Roads in Hungary
