= Óbarok =

- Location of Fejér county in Hungary

- Location of Óbarok
- Coordinates: 47.49100°N 18.57049°E
- Country: Hungary
- County: Fejér

Area
  - Total: 17.6 km^{2} (6.8 sq mi)

Population (2004)
  - Total: 797
  - Density: 45.28/km^{2} (117.3/sq mi)
- Time zone: UTC+1 (CET)
  - Summer (DST): UTC+2 (CEST)
- Postal code: 2063
- Area code: 22
- Motorways: M1
- Distance from Budapest: 42.9 km (26.7 mi) East
- Website: www.obarok.hu

Óbarok and Nagyegyháza villages – until the recent past – never been individual administrative unit. After all, due to the geographical location and the common past of the population of the villages, they must be handled together.

Óbarok (Nagyegyháza) is a village in the region named Central Transdanubia, situated on the North of Fejér county, 50 km from Székesfehérvár, in Hungary. The village is lying between the Gerecse and Vértes mountains, in the Váli Valley (Váli völgy).

Óbarok was mentioned first in 1365. In a strange way, Nagyegyháza (former Németegyháza) was mentioned first in 1703, although the historians treated more important settlement. Their opinion is supported by a temple ruin from the Árpád Era (between 1000 and 1300 AD). In the Middle Ages, the two villages were mentioned as "puszta", which is an important unit of the agriculture.

The settlements were emptied more times while the Turkey and Tartar army attacked Hungary but due to their fortunate geographical location they were populated again and again. After the Turkey army has been ousted, the two settlements were developed on their own way. Óbarok was the property of the landed gentry, while Nagyegyháza was populated by the villeins of Batthyány manor.

In the year 2000 the citizens of Óbarok and Nagyegyháza decided that they establish an autonomous parish but, in lack of money, the neighbour village, Felcsút also was involved. At the end of 2004, the local authority of Felcsút decided that exits from the Regional Clerk's Office, thus in January, 2005 the common local authority of Óbarok and Nagyegyháza was founded in Óbarok.
