= Kisigmánd Wind Farm =

Wind farm in Hungary

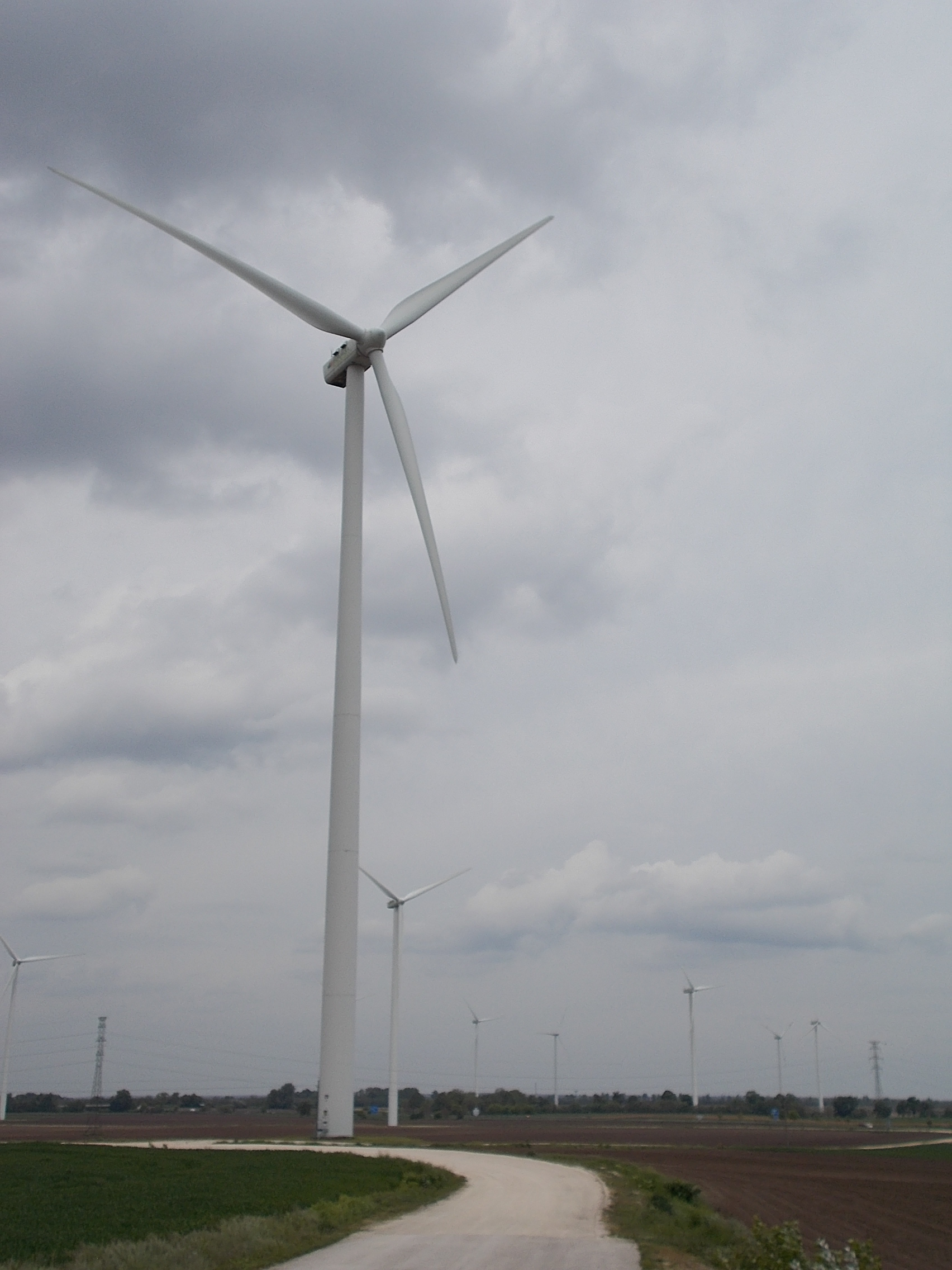
- Country: Hungary
- Location: Kisigmánd, Komárom-Esztergom County
- Coordinates: 47°40′29″N 18°4′16″E
- Status: Operational
- Commission date: 2009
- Owner: Iberdrola Renovables

Power generation
- Nameplate capacity: 50 MW

The Kisigmánd Wind Farm is a wind power project in Komárom-Esztergom County, Hungary. It is owned and operated by Iberdrola Renovables, and has an output of up to 50 MW of power, which made it Hungary's largest wind farm by power generation when it was built. It was Iberdrola's first wind farm in Hungary when it began operation in early 2009.

== See also ==
- Wind power in Hungary
