= European route E575 =

Road in trans-European E-road network

E575

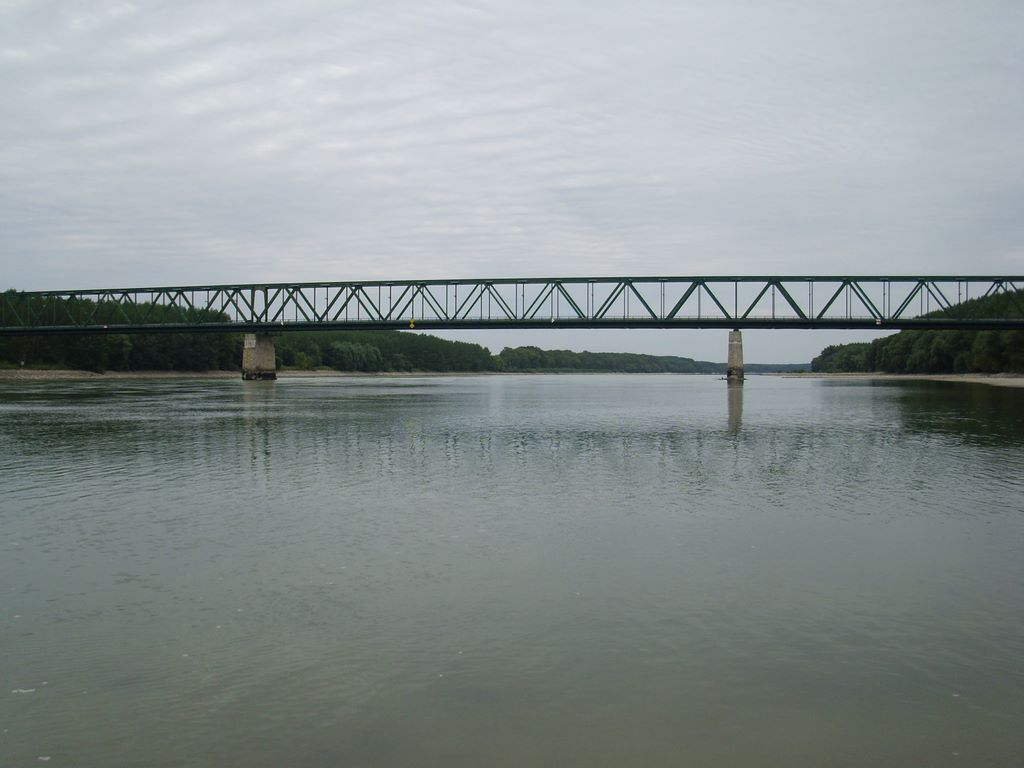
- Bridge carrying E575 over the Danube (international border) between Medveďov, Slovakia, and Vámosszabadi, Hungary

Route information
- Length: 95 km (59 mi)

Major junctions
- From: Bratislava
- Dunajská Streda
- To: Győr

Location
- Countries: Slovakia; Hungary

Highway system
- International E-road network; A Class; B Class

European route E 575 is a road part of the International E-road network. It begins in Bratislava, Dunajská Streda, Slovakia and ends in Győr, Hungary.

== Route and E-road junctions ==
- Slovakia (on shared signage R7 I/63 then I/13)
  - Bratislava: E58, E65, E75, E571
  - Dunajská Streda
  - Medveďov (near Hungarian border)
- Hungary (on shared signage 14)
  - Vámosszabadi (near Slovakian border)
  - Győr: E60, E75
