= Balatonederics =

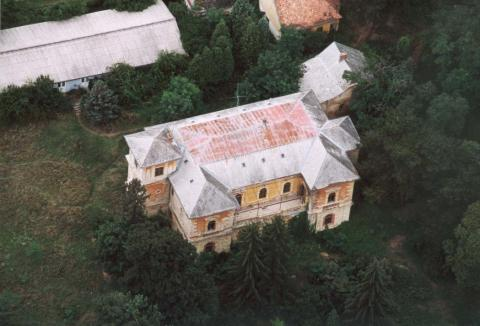

- Flag Coat of arms

- Location of Veszprém county in Hungary

- Location of Balatonederics
- Coordinates: 46.80562°N 17.37789°E
- Country: Hungary
- County: Veszprém

Area
  - Total: 18.59 km^{2} (7.18 sq mi)

Population (2017)
  - Total: 996
  - Density: 53.6/km^{2} (139/sq mi)
- Time zone: UTC+1 (CET)
  - Summer (DST): UTC+2 (CEST)
- Postal code: 8312
- Area code: 87

Balatonederics (Hungarian pronunciation: [ˈbɒlɒtonɛdɛrit͡ʃ]) is a small resort town next to Lake Balaton in Hungary. It was first mentioned in 1262. The Roman Catholic Church in the village dates from that time, although its neogothic exterior is from 1870.

In Balatonederics an Africa Museum and zoo can be visited. It was founded by Endre Nagy in 1984 and houses hunting trophies and ethnographic artefacts from Tanzania.

In the 19th and 20th centuries, a small Jewish community lived in the village, in 1880 65 Jews lived in the village, most of whom were murdered in the Holocaust. The community had a Jewish cemetery.

== What to see in Balatonederics ==
- Stalactite cave
- Lake Balaton biggest golf course
- Beautiful beach
- Wine region
- Very old Palace

== Gallery ==
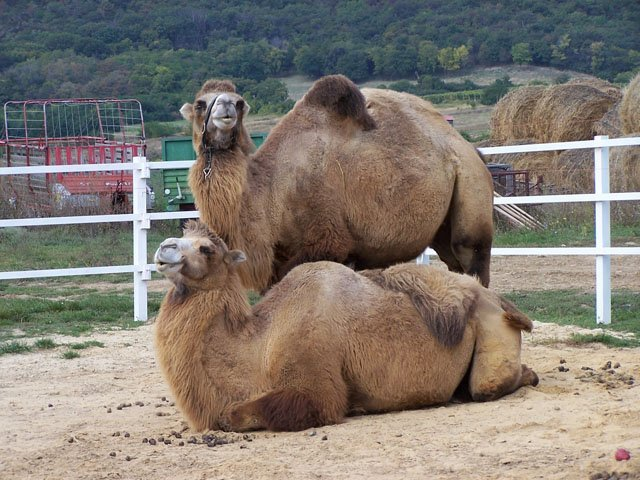
Africa museum and zoo

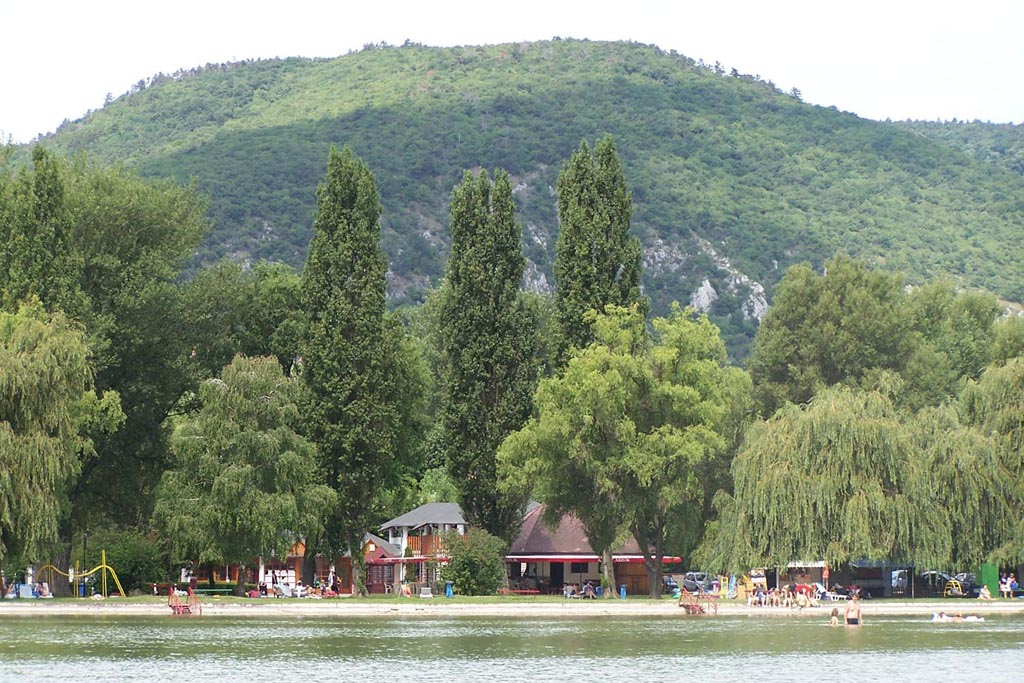
Balatonederics Strand & Beach
