= Main road 813 (Hungary) =

Road in Hungary

Main road 813
- 813-as főút
- Eastern bypass of Győr
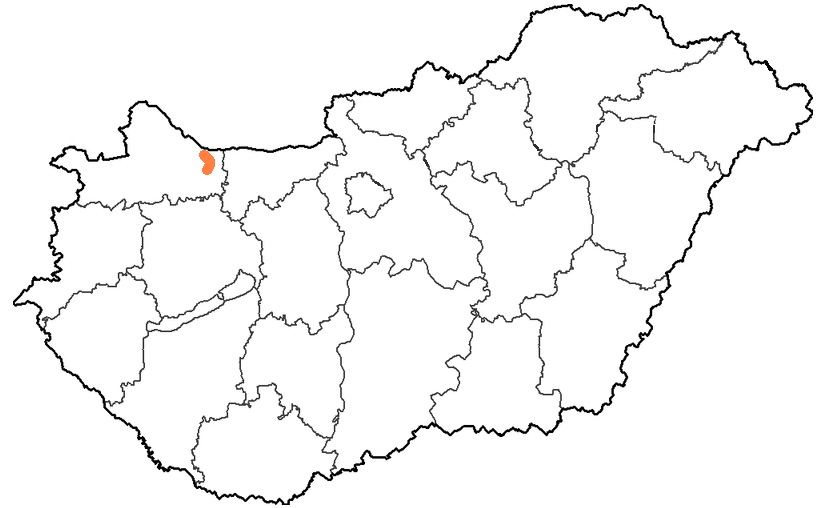

Route information
- Length: 13.4 km (8.3 mi)
- History: 2015–2018

Major junctions
- From: M1 in Győrszentiván
- M19 in Győr-Audi; 1 near Kertváros
- To: 14 near Sáráspuszta

Location
- Country: Hungary
- Counties: Győr-Moson-Sopron
- Major cities: Győr

Highway system
- Roads in Hungary; Highways; Main roads; Local roads

The Main road 813 is a short bypass direction Secondary class main road near Győr, that connects the M1 motorway's Győrszentiván junction to the Main road 14. The road is 13.4 kilometres (8.3 mi) long.

The road, as well as all other main roads in Hungary, is managed and maintained by Magyar Közút, state owned company.

== See also ==
- Roads in Hungary
