= Main road 830 (Hungary) =

Road in Hungary

Main road 830
- 830-as főút
- Northern bypass of Veszprém

Route information
- Length: 6.6 km (4.1 mi)

Major junctions
- From: 82 near Újtelep
- To: 8 near Iparváros

Location
- Country: Hungary
- Counties: Veszprém
- Major cities: Veszprém

Highway system
- Roads in Hungary; Highways; Main roads; Local roads

The Main road 830 is a short bypass direction Secondary class main road in Veszprém, that connects the Main road 82 in the eastern and Main road 8 western part of the city. The road is 6.6 kilometres (4.1 mi) long.

The road, as well as all other main roads in Hungary, is managed and maintained by Magyar Közút, state owned company.

Major junctions are with Route 62, Aradi Vértanúk utca, Tüzér utca, Pápai út and with Route 8. All in Veszprém.

== See also ==
- Roads in Hungary
