= Main road 222 (Hungary) =

Road in Hungary

Main road 222
- 222-es főút

Route information
- Length: 0.172 km (0.107 mi; 560 ft)

Major junctions
- From: 22 in Balassagyarmat
- To: Ipoly Bridge border with Slovakia II/527A

Location
- Country: Hungary
- Counties: Nógrád
- Major cities: Balassagyarmat

Highway system
- Roads in Hungary; Highways; Main roads; Local roads

The Main road 222 is a short south–north direction Secondary class main road in Balassagyarmat, that connects the Main road 22 change to the border of Slovakia. The road is 0.2 kilometres (0.12 mi) long.

The road, as well as all other main roads in Hungary, is managed and maintained by Magyar Közút, state owned company.

== See also ==
- Roads in Hungary
