= Nagyszentjános =

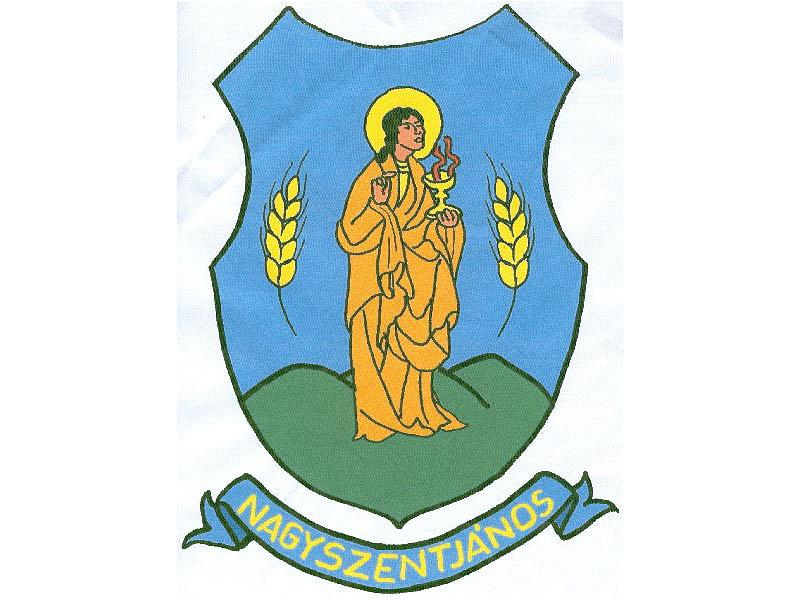
- Coat of arms

- Location of Győr-Moson-Sopron county in Hungary

- Location of Győrszentiván
- Coordinates: 47.71037°N 17.87069°E
- Country: Hungary
- County: Győr-Moson-Sopron

Area
  - Total: 30.3 km^{2} (11.7 sq mi)

Population (2004)
  - Total: 1,859
  - Density: 61.35/km^{2} (158.9/sq mi)
- Time zone: UTC+1 (CET)
  - Summer (DST): UTC+2 (CEST)
- Postal code: 9072
- Area code: 96
- Motorways: M1
- Distance from Budapest: 104 km (65 mi) East

Nagyszentjános is a village in Győr-Moson-Sopron county, Hungary.
