= Veszprémvarsány =

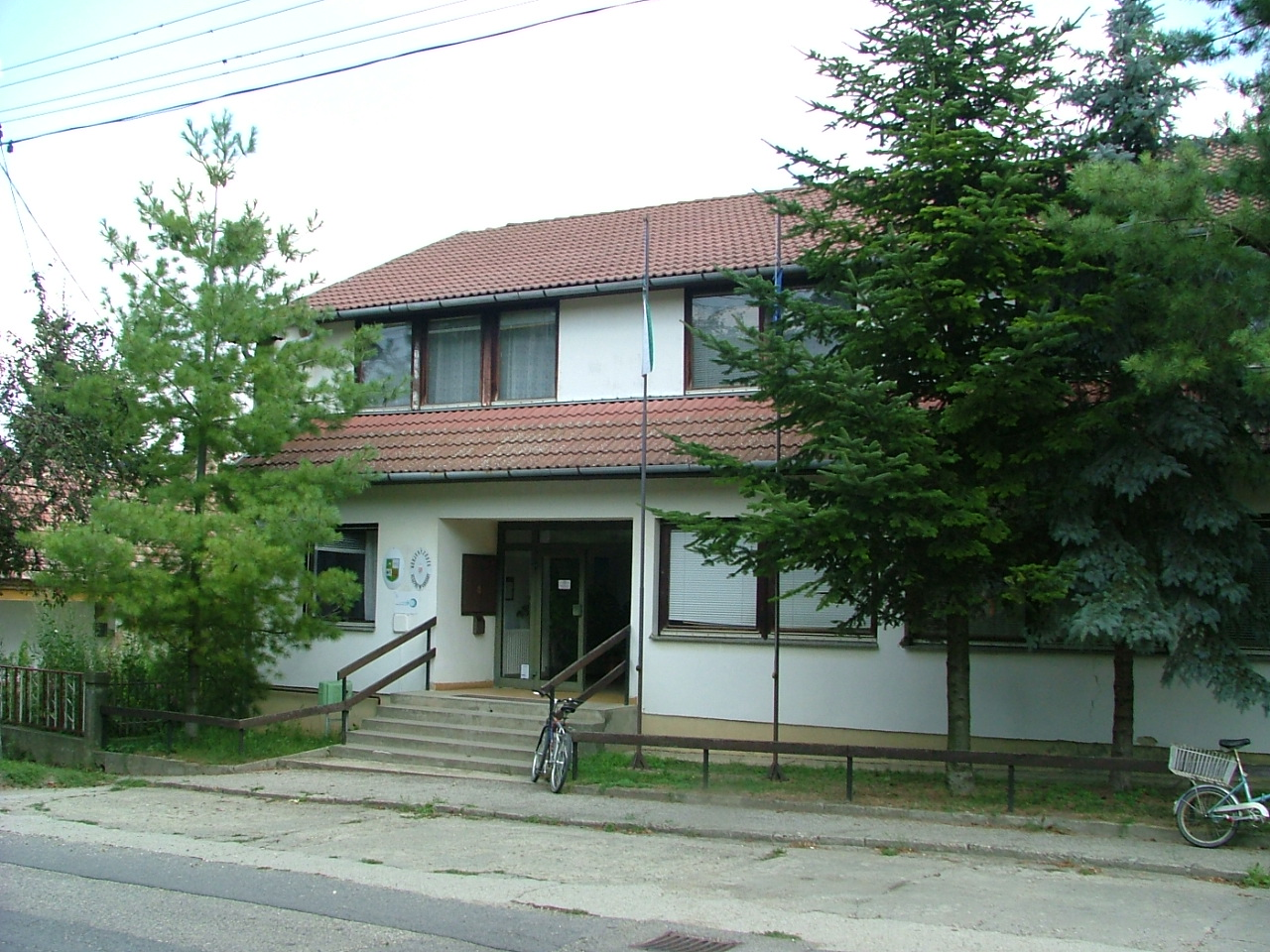
- Village hall

- Flag Coat of arms

- Location of Győr-Moson-Sopron county in Hungary

- Location of Veszprémvarsány
- Coordinates: 47.42944°N 17.82940°E
- Country: Hungary
- County: Győr-Moson-Sopron

Area
  - Total: 21.19 km^{2} (8.18 sq mi)

Population (2004)
  - Total: 1,036
  - Density: 48.89/km^{2} (126.6/sq mi)
- Time zone: UTC+1 (CET)
  - Summer (DST): UTC+2 (CEST)
- Postal code: 8438
- Area code: 88

Veszprémvarsány is a village in Győr-Moson-Sopron county, Hungary.
