= Pétervására =

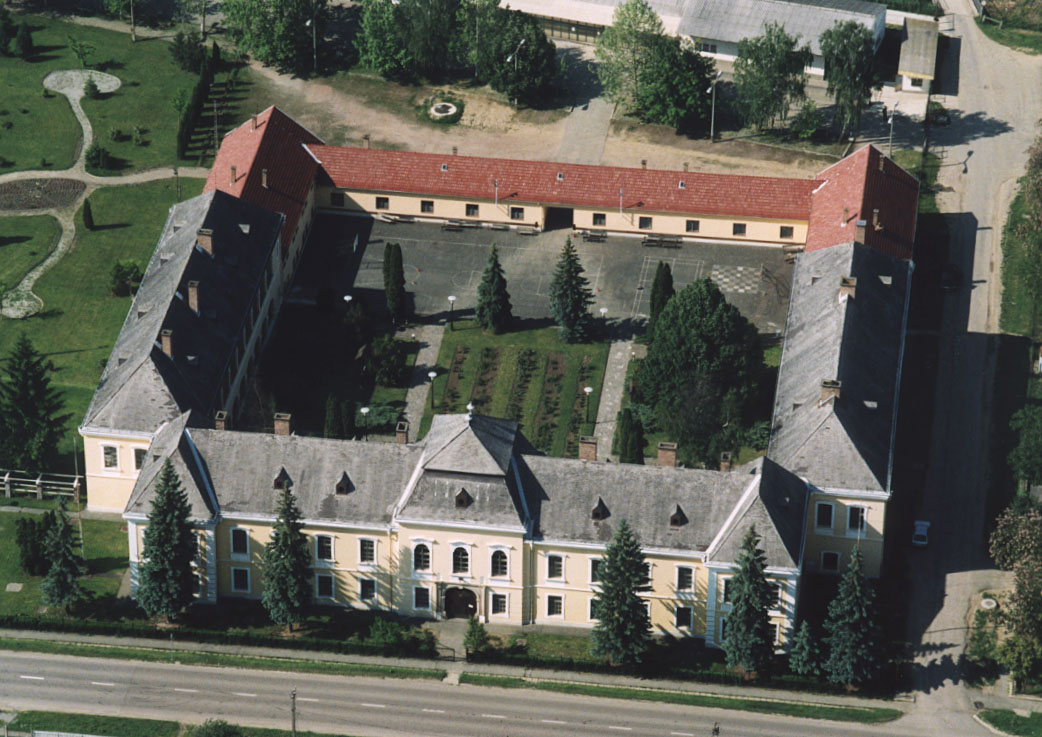
- Aerial photograph of Pétervására Castle

- Flag Coat of arms

- Location of Pétervására in Hungary
- Coordinates: 48.023°N 20.099°E
- Country: Hungary
- Region: Northern Hungary
- County: Heves

Area
  - Total: 33.87 km^{2} (13.08 sq mi)

Population (2009)
  - Total: 2,534
  - Density: 74.82/km^{2} (193.8/sq mi)
- Time zone: UTC+1 (CET)
  - Summer (DST): UTC+2 (CEST)
- Postal code: 3250
- Area code: +36 36
- KSH code: 12070
- Website: www.petervasara.hu

Pétervására is a town in Heves county, Hungary. It is famous for its Keglevich Castle.

Pétervására features Medici lion statues (of unknown origin).

== Twin towns – sister cities ==
Pétervására is twinned with:

- Jesenské, Slovakia
- Fântânele, Romania
