= Kisigmánd =

- Location of Komárom-Esztergom county in Hungary

- Location of Kisigmánd
- Coordinates: 47.65440°N 18.09710°E
- Country: Hungary
- County: Komárom-Esztergom

Area
  - Total: 13.14 km^{2} (5.07 sq mi)

Population (2004)
  - Total: 544
  - Density: 41.4/km^{2} (107/sq mi)
- Time zone: UTC+1 (CET)
  - Summer (DST): UTC+2 (CEST)
- Postal code: 2948
- Area code: 34
- Motorways: M1
- Distance from Budapest: 88.9 km (55.2 mi) East

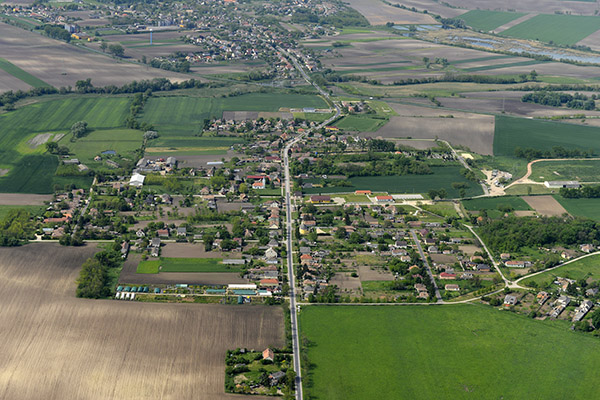
An aerial photo of Kisigmánd

Kisigmánd is a village in Komárom-Esztergom county, Hungary. The Hungarian band Apostol performed at the Kisigmánd Village Day in 2024.

== See also ==
- Kisigmánd Wind Farm
