= Városlőd =

Városlőd Waschludt (in German)
- Location of Veszprém county in Hungary

- Location of Városlőd
- Coordinates: 47.14372°N 17.65034°E
- Country: Hungary
- County: Veszprém

Area
  - Total: 22.27 km^{2} (8.60 sq mi)

Population (2004)
  - Total: 1,466
  - Density: 65.82/km^{2} (170.5/sq mi)
- Time zone: UTC+1 (CET)
  - Summer (DST): UTC+2 (CEST)
- Postal code: 8445
- Area code: 88

Városlőd (German: Waschludt) is a village in Veszprém county, Hungary. Its partner town (sister city) is Wiesthal, Germany.

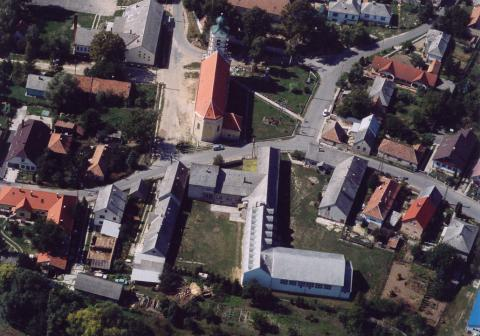
Aerial photograph of Városlőd

== History ==
Városlőd, or Waschludt (German), was established after the end of Ottoman rule in 1699, when German settlers from Mainz, the Rhine area and the Spessart came to the region. It was a popular migratory area due to its woods and the rich resources of clay and ore. Thus, many settlers built glass and iron-hammer factories or worked as lime-burners. The first foreman was Rubner Péter János who had come to Városlőd from the region of Linz with his family and a group of iron workers. Business leaders and Foremen that followed were of German origin as well, such as Michael Gasteiger from Upper Bavaria and Ferdinand Adler from Moravia who came from a famous dynasty of glass factory owners.

Alongside the craftsmen, the manufactures of Városlőd played a big role in the city's economy. Vince Stingl and Károly Stingl founded a small pottery in the early 19th century which soon was very successful. They mostly produced tableware but also water bottles, vases, pots, jars and tiles. For some time, they even had their porcelain painted in Városlőd. Later on, Vince Stingl founded the now famous Herend Porcelain Factory.

== Culture ==
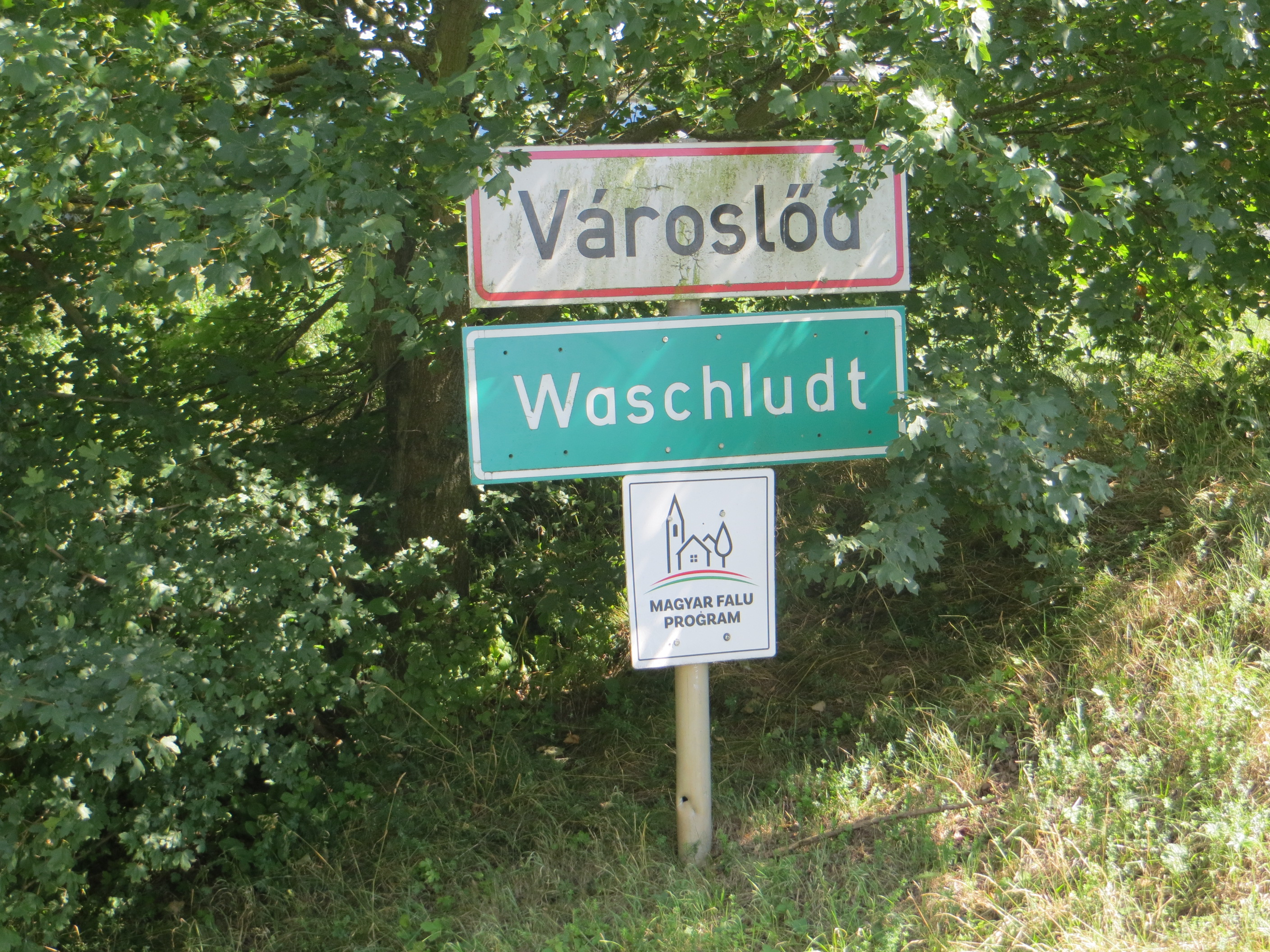
bilingual city sign

Városlőd has a long history of German culture, and has a German Culture Museum in the city The village also has a heritage museum which displays everyday objects of Danube Swabians. The Museum preserves the traditions of Germans of Hungary and frequently offers events, such as the Ball of Swabians. Furthermore, the local choir and folklore dance group have a 40-year-old tradition of Hungarian and Swabian performances which contribute to the commemoration of the history of Danube Swabians.

The baroque church, which was built on the foundations of a former gothic monastery, is worth visiting. The monastery was the site of the Érdy Codex of 1527. In the park next to the church, a memorial for displaced people can be found which commemorates the partnership between Városlőd and the Bavarian Wiesthal. Furthermore, a hero memorial displaying Városlőd's victims of World War I and II can be seen.

== Demographics ==
In the census of 1941, 86 percent of the inhabitants registered as native speakers of German.
