= Nagybajcs =

- Coat of arms

- Location of Győr-Moson-Sopron county in Hungary

- Location of Nagybajcs
- Coordinates: 47.76160°N 17.68732°E
- Country: Hungary
- County: Győr-Moson-Sopron

Area
  - Total: 7.65 km^{2} (2.95 sq mi)

Population (2004)
  - Total: 876
  - Density: 114.5/km^{2} (297/sq mi)
- Time zone: UTC+1 (CET)
  - Summer (DST): UTC+2 (CEST)
- Postal code: 9063
- Area code: 96

Nagybajcs is a village in Győr-Moson-Sopron county, Hungary.
