= M1 motorway (Hungary) =

Road in Hungary

M1 motorway
- M1-es autópálya
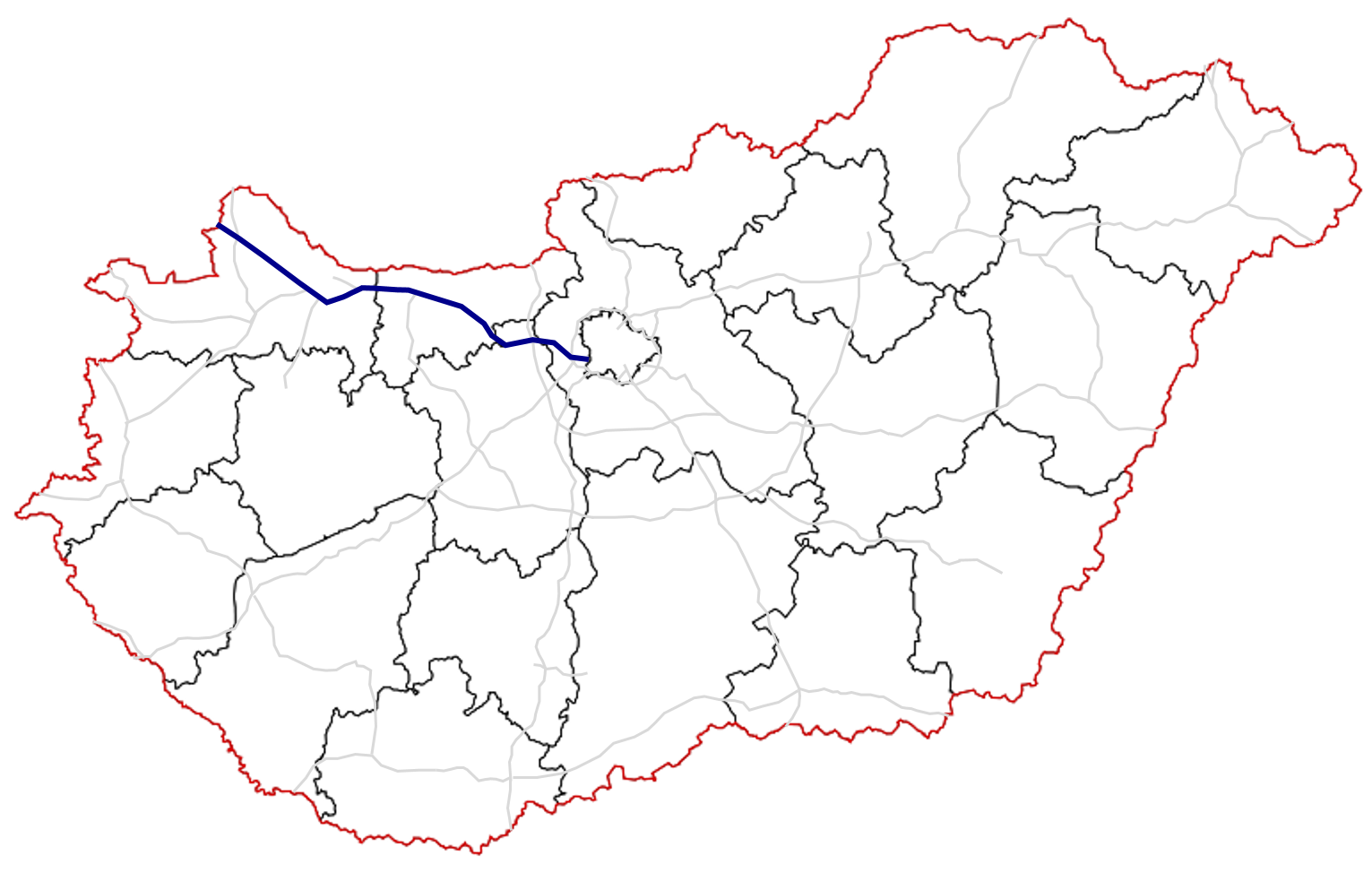
- in use other highways

Route information
- Part of E60 / E65 / E75
- Length: 171 km (106 mi)
- Existed: 1964–present
- History: Completed: 1996

Major junctions
- From: Budapest
- M7 near Budaörs; M0 near Biatorbágy; 102 near Zsámbék; 13 near Komárom; M19, 813, 81, 82, 83, M85 near Győr; 86 in Mosonmagyaróvár; M15 near Lébény
- To: Hegyeshalom; A 4 border with Austria

Location
- Country: Hungary
- Counties: Pest, Fejér, Komárom-Esztergom, Győr-Moson-Sopron
- Major cities: Budapest, Tatabánya, Tata, Győr, Mosonmagyaróvár

Highway system
- Roads in Hungary; Highways; Main roads; Local roads

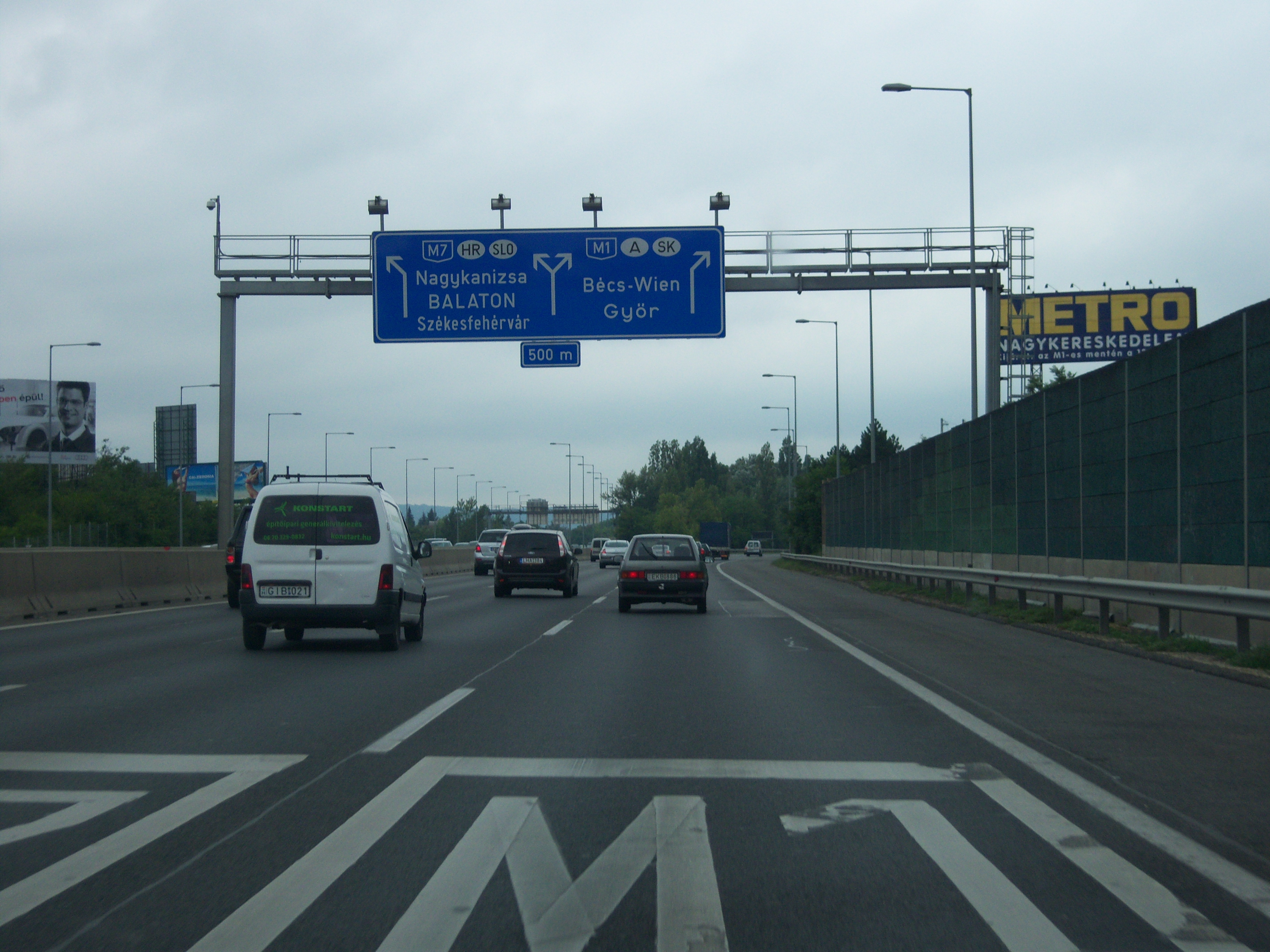
Junction near Budapest

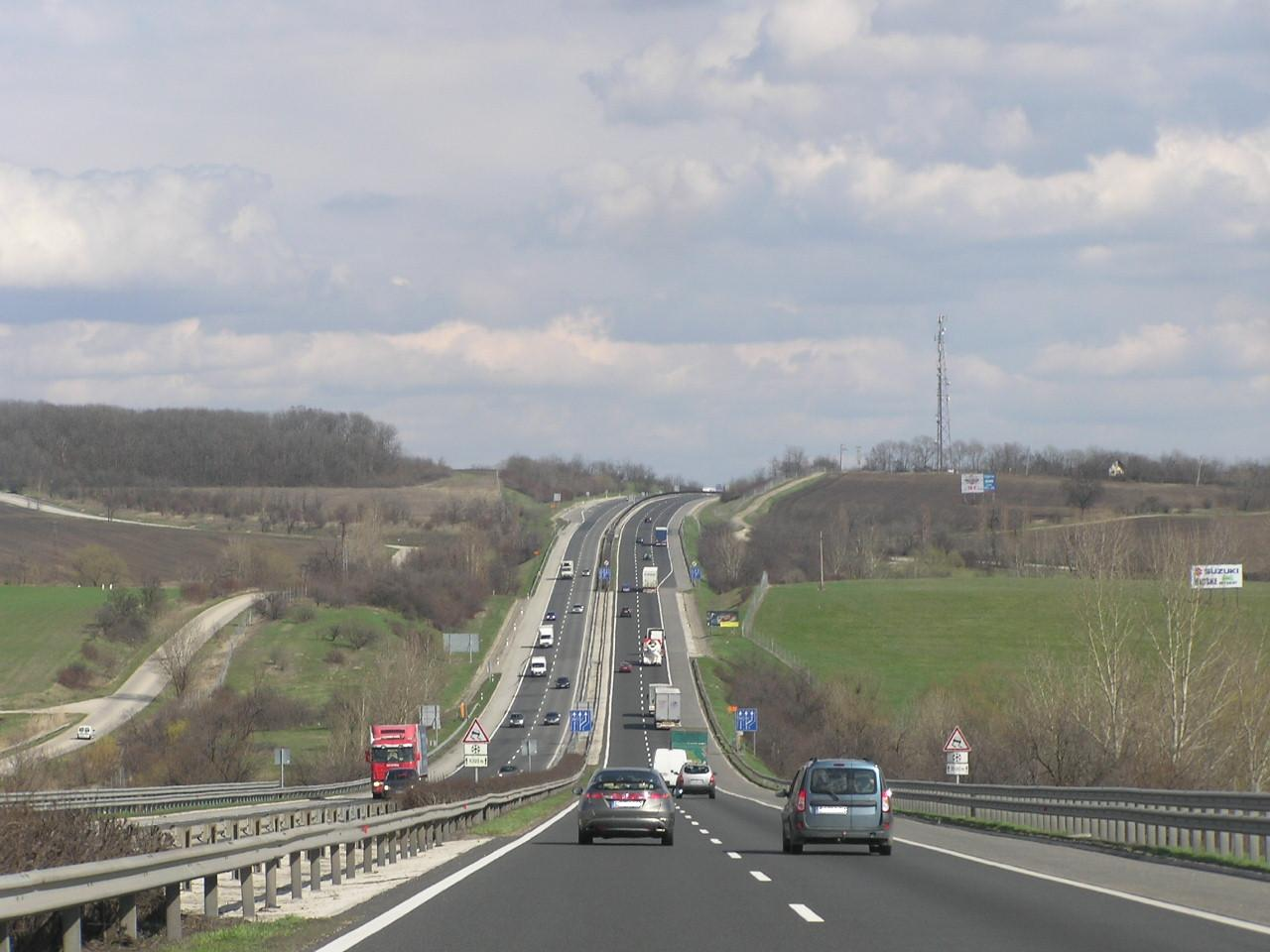
The motorway between Vértes and Gerecse Mountains

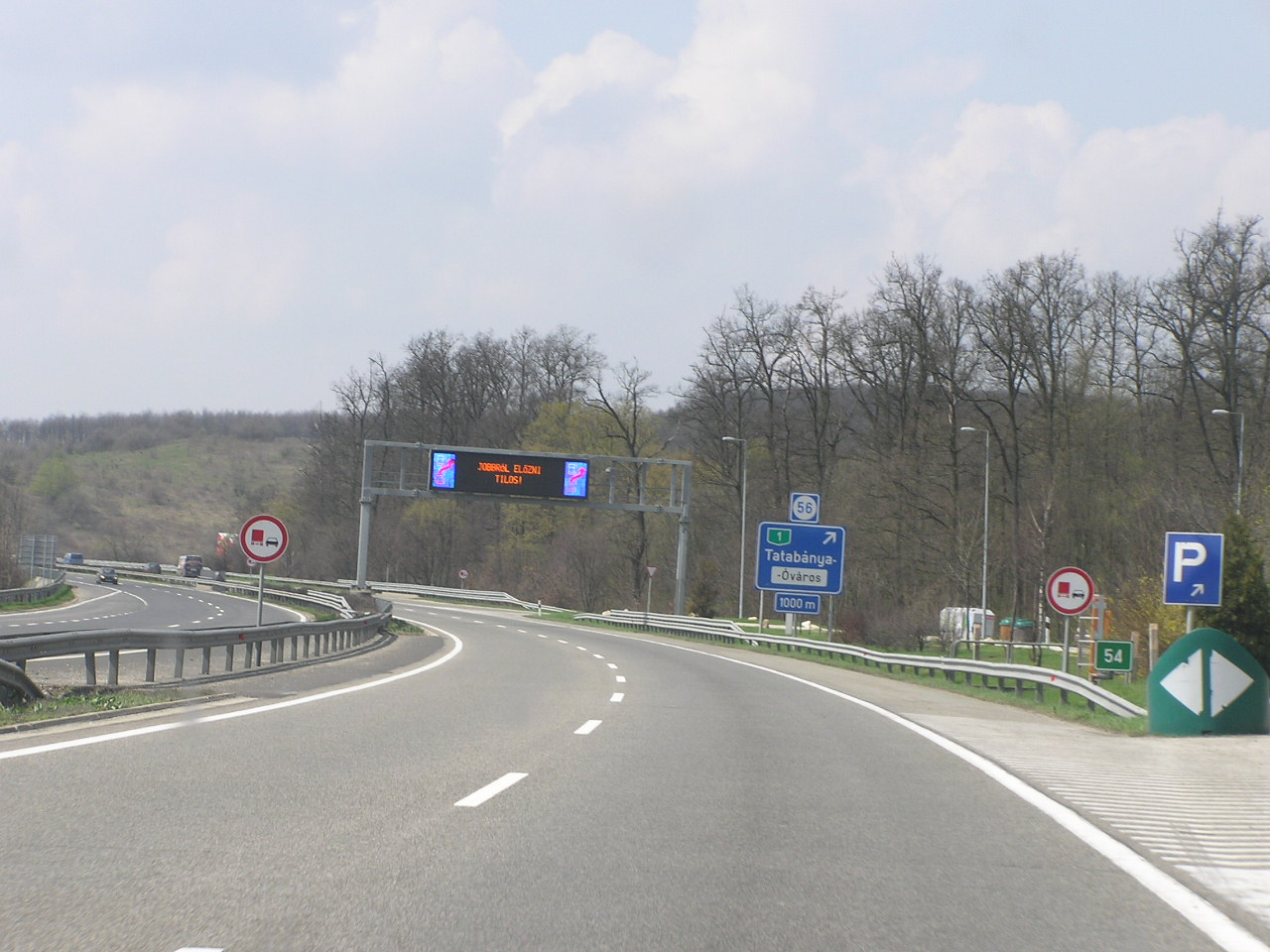
Road near Tatabánya-Óváros

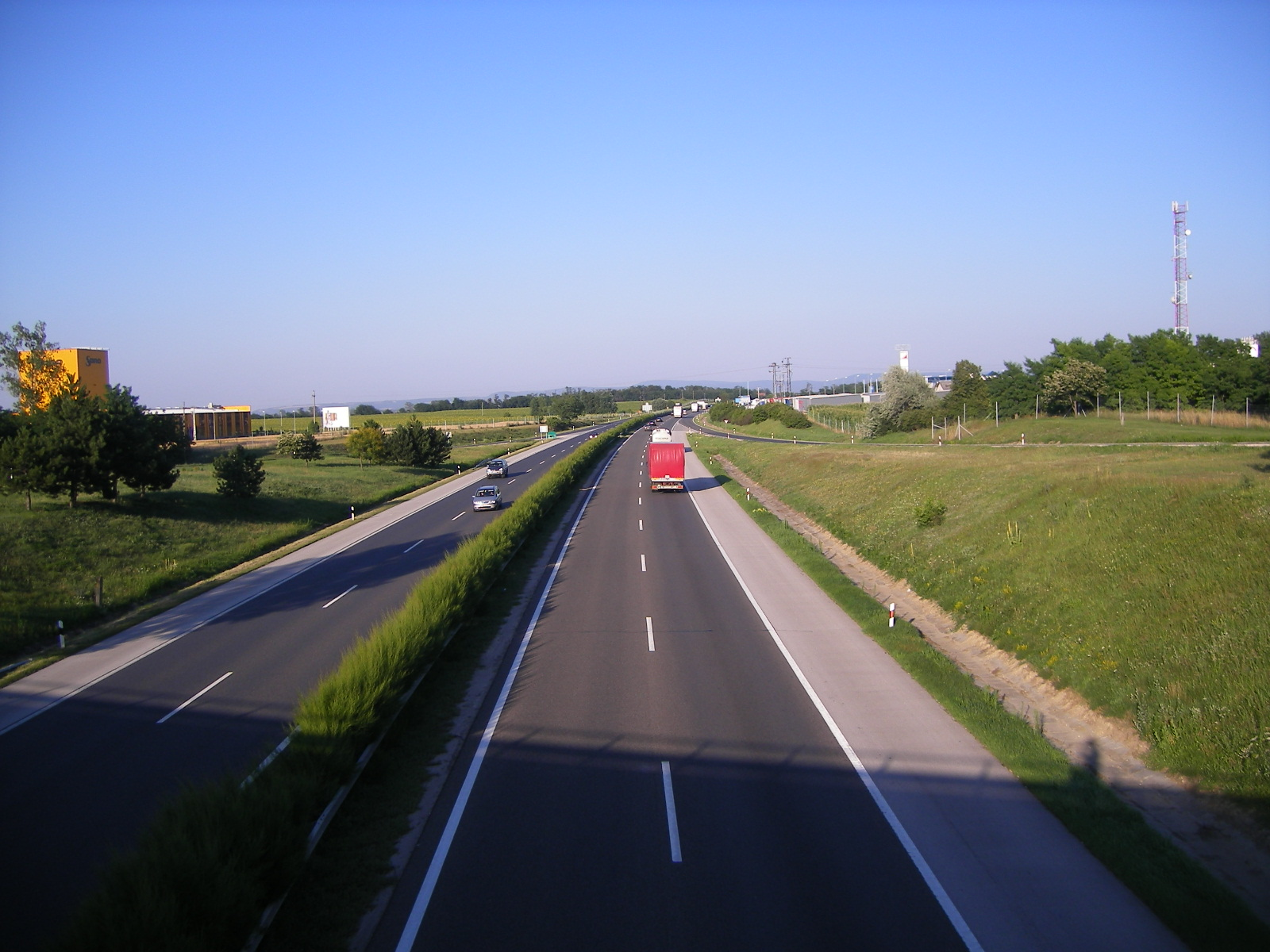
Near Kisigmánd

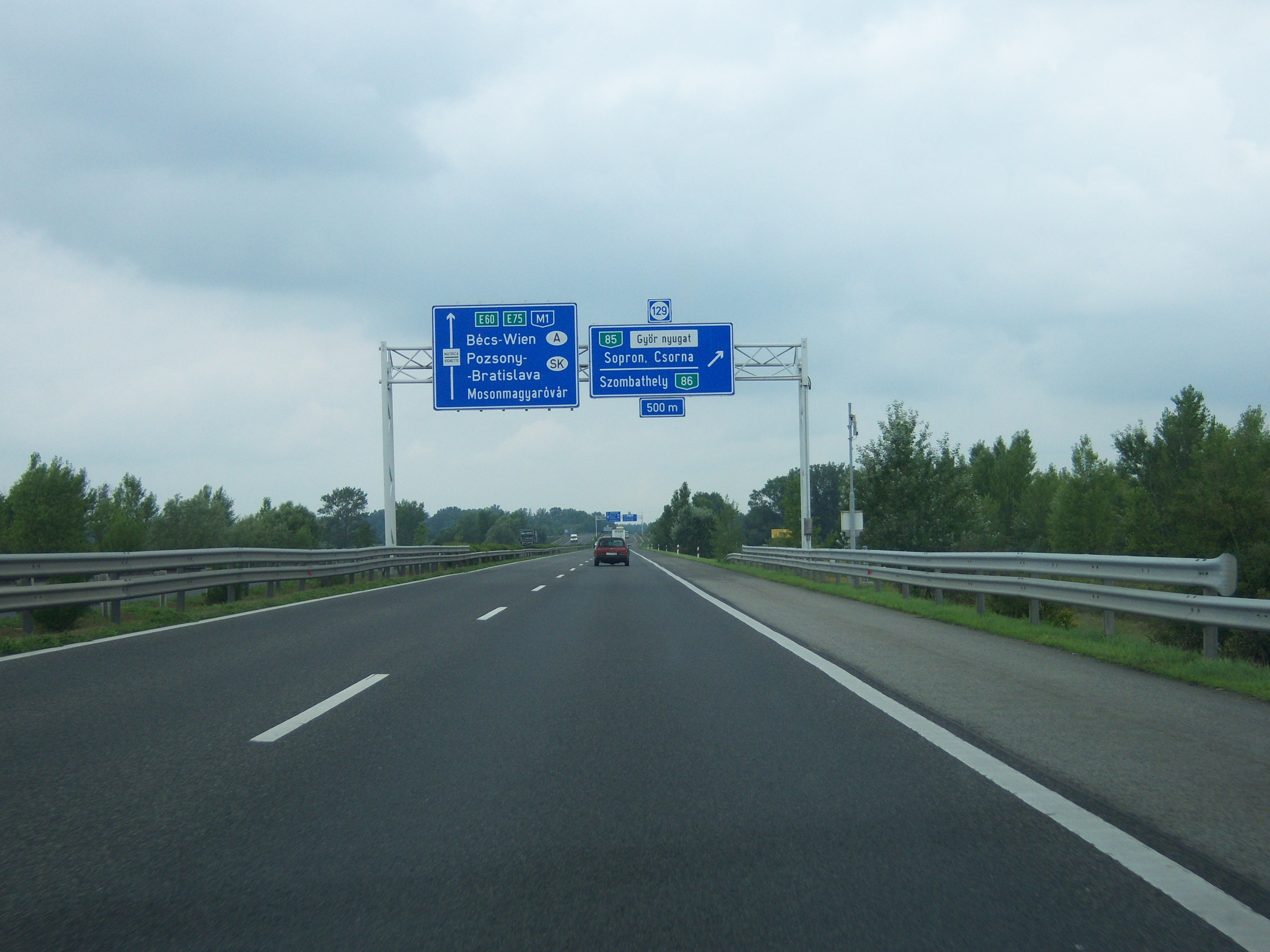
Near Győr-nyugat (M85 interchange)

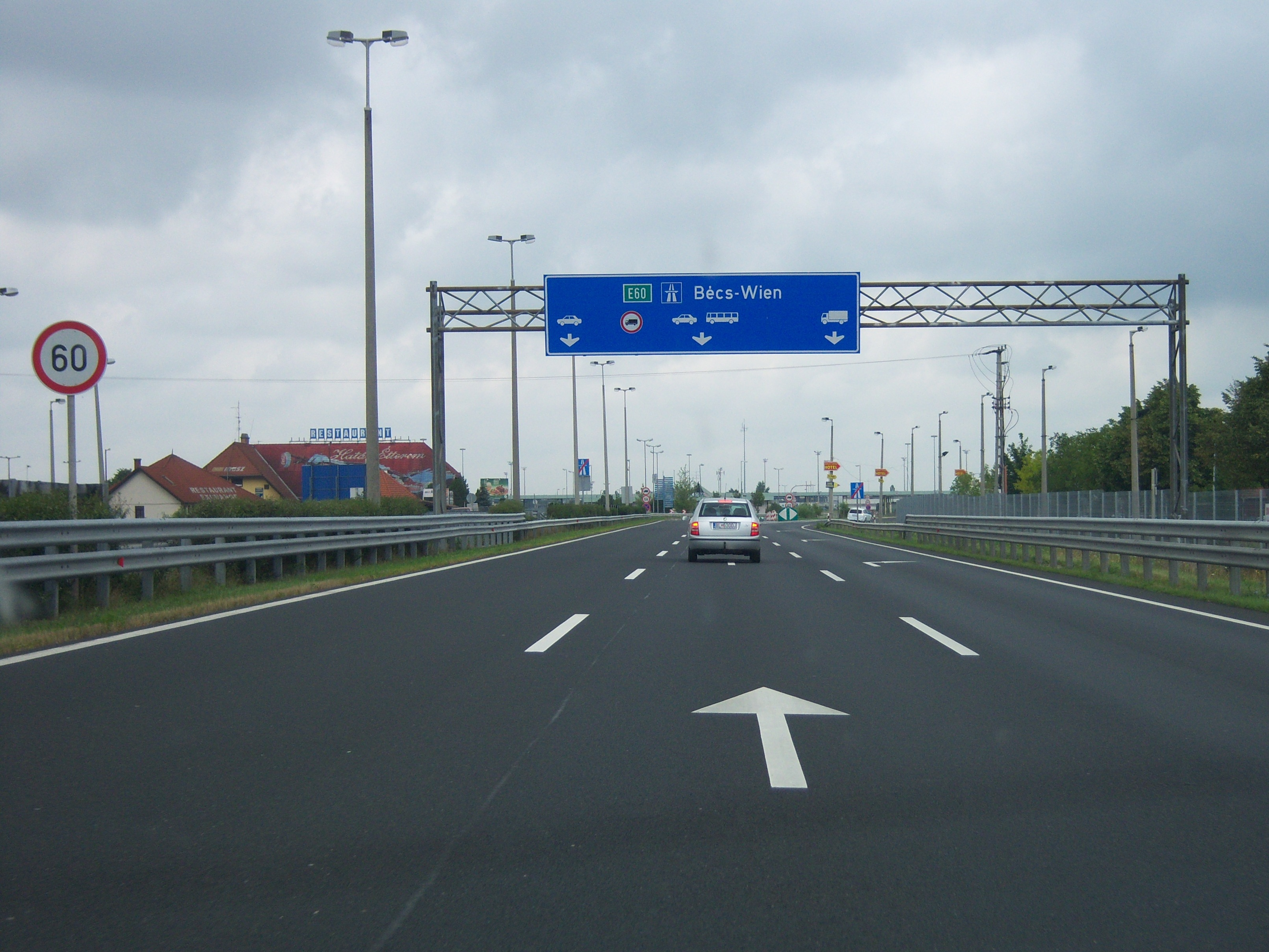
Hungarian-Austrian border

The M1 motorway (Hungarian: M1-es autópálya) is a toll motorway in northwestern Hungary, connecting Budapest to Győr and Vienna. The first section of the motorway opened in the 1970s, reaching the Austrian border at Hegyeshalom in 1996. It follows the route of the old Route 1 one-lane highway.

== Openings timeline ==
- Budapest – Budaörs (7 and 12 km): 1964 - half profile; (this section was extended 2x3 lane in 1978-79)
- Budaörs – Budakeszi (4 km): 1981 - half profile; (this section was extended in 1986)
- Budakeszi – Zsámbék (9 km): 1986
- Zsámbék – Bicske (13 km): 1985
- Bicske – Tatabánya-north (28 km): 1982
- Tatabánya-north – Komárom (20 km): 1975 - half profile; (this section was extended 2x2 lane in 1990)
- Komárom – Győr-east (19 km): 1977 - half profile; (this section was extended 2x2 lane in 1990)
- Győr-east – Győr-Ménfőcsanak (8 km): 1994
- Győr-Ménfőcsanak – Győr-west (14 km): 1994
- Győr-west – Hegyeshalom-east (42 km): 1996
- Hegyeshalom-east – Border station of Austria (6 km): 1982 - half profile; this section operated as part of road 1 until 1996

== List of junctions, exits and rest area ==
- The route is full length motorway. The maximum speed limit is 130km/h, with (2x2 lane road with stop lane).

Distance from Zero Kilometre Stone (Adam Clark Square) in Budapest in kilometres.

km	Exit	Name	Destination	Notes
6	Exit	Budapest, Budaörsi út	1; 7	Connection to the center of Budapest, via Budaörsi út. The eastern terminus of the motorway. The eastern side of commons section as M1-M7 motorway.
7	Exit	Budaörs		
9	Exit	Budaörs-centrum	81101	Drive only towards Budapest. Shopping centers
10	Exit	Törökbálint Depo, Budaörs		Eastern connection to Budaörs via Garibaldi utca.
10	Rest area	Budaörsi pihenőhely		Rest area: MOL / MOL +
11	Exit	Budaörs-nyugat	8105	Western connection of Budaörs and Shopping centers.
12	Interchange	M1-M7 intersection	M7	Connection to M7 motorway towards to Croatia via Székesfehérvár, Nagykanizsa. The western side of commons section as M1-M7 motorway.
14	Exit	Törökbálint, Budakeszi	8102	
15	Exit	Tópark		Premier Outlet Center
16	Interchange	M1-M0 interchange	M0; E60; E75	Connection to Budapest bypass. The eastern terminus of European routes E60/E75 concurrency.
17	Exit	Biatorbágy	1	Drive only towards Budapest. Eastern part Biatorbágy.
22	Rest area	Sasfészek-tó pihenőhely		Rest area: MOL / MOL +
22	Exit	Biatorbágy, Páty	1	Western part of Biatorbágy and Business park.
27	Exit	Zsámbék, Herceghalom	102; 1101	Connection to Pilisjászfalu
28	Rest area	Zsámbéki pihenőhely		Rest area: MOL / MOL +
Border of Pest and Fejér Counties
39	Exit	Óbarok-Nagyegyháza, Bicske	1	
43	Rest area	Óbarok pihenőhely		Rest area: OMV / OMV +
43	Exit		8101	Not marked with a traffic sign
	Exit	Szárliget; Bicske M1 Ipari Park	8113	
Border of Fejér and Komárom-Esztergom Counties
54	Rest area	Harkályos pihenőhely		Rest area:
56	Exit	Tatabánya-Óváros	1	Connection to Óváros part of Tatabánya
57	Rest area	Turul pihenőhely		Rest area:
61	Exit	Tatabánya-Centrum	1	Connection to Downtown of Tatabánya
64	Rest area	Remeteségi pihenőhely		Rest area: Shell / Shell +
64		Tata-Remeteségpuszta		Not marked with a traffic sign
67	Exit	Tata, Környe	8119	Connection to Csákvár
72	Rest area	Grébics pihenőhely		Rest area:
83	Rest area	Igmánd pihenőhely		Rest area:
85	Exit	Komárom, Kisbér	13	
94	Exit	Ács, Bana, Bábolna	8151	
94	Rest area	Concó pihenőhely		Rest area: OMV / OMV +
Border of Komárom-Esztergom and Győr-Moson-Sopron Counties
101	Exit	Nagyszentjános, Bőny	8152	
107	Interchange	Győr-kelet	M19	Access route of Győr. Eastern connection to the city
112	Exit	Győrszentiván	813; 8136	Eastern bypass to Győr, towards Vámosszabadi and Audi factory.
115	Exit	Győr-iparterület	81	Industrial area of Győr.
119	Exit	Győr-Szabadhegy	82	Szabadhegy district of Győr and Pannonhalma, Veszprém.
119	Rest area	Arrabona pihenőhely		Rest area: MOL / OMV +
123	Exit	Győr-Ménfőcsanak	83	Connection to Ménfőcsanak district of Győr and Pápa
	Bridge	Rába (Bridge - 355 m)		
129	Interchange	Győr, Csorna	M85; 85	Western connection to Szeged, towards to Austria via Sopron and Szombathely
135	Rest area	Börcs pihenő		Rest area:
142	Exit	Lébény, Mecsér	8417	
144	Rest area	Lébény pihenő		Rest area:
150	Rest area	Hanság pihenő		Rest area:
158	Rest area	Lajta pihenőhely		Rest area:
160	Exit	Mosonmagyaróvár, Szombathely	86; E65	The eastern terminus of European routes E65
162	Rest area	Mosoni pihenőhely		Rest area: MOL / MOL +
166	Interchange	M1-M15 interchange	M15; E65; E75	Connection to M15 motorway, towards to Bratislava, Slovakia; The western terminus of European routes E65/E75
168	Exit	Hegyeshalom-kelet	101	Eastern connection to Hegyeshalom.
171	Exit	Hegyeshalom		
172	Border control	Hegyeshalom border crossing	A 4 E60	Connection to border crossing to Austria as the A4 motorway towards Vienna. The western terminus of the motorway and of the European route E60 concurrency.
1.000 mi = 1.609 km; 1.000 km = 0.621 mi: Concurrency terminus; Incomplete access; Unopened

== Maintenance ==
The operation and maintenance of the road by Hungarian Public Road Nonprofit Pte Ltd Co. This activity is provided by these highway engineers.

- near Bicske, kilometre trench 38
- near Komárom, kilometre trench 85
- near Lébény, kilometre trench 142

== Payment ==
Hungarian system has 2 main type in terms of salary:

1, time-based fee vignettes (E-matrica); with a validity of either 10 days (3500 HUF), 1 month (4780 HUF) or 1 year (42980 HUF).

2, county vignettes (Megyei matrica); the highway can be used instead of the national sticker with the following county stickers:

Type of county vignette	Available section
Pest County	between Egér Street junction and Bicske (7 km – 39 km)
Fejér County	between Herceghalom and Tatabánya-Óváros (27 km – 56 km)
Komárom-Esztergom County	between Bicske and Győrszentiván (39 km – 112 km)
Győr-Moson-Sopron County	between Bábolna and Hegyeshalom [state border] (94 km – 172 km)

=== Toll-free section ===
- From Border of Budapest to Egér Street section (5 km – 7 km) can be used free of charge.

== European Route(s) ==
Name	Route
	155 km	(Austria) Ost Autobahn – junction (16)
	150 km	junction (166) – junction (16)
	6 km	junction (166) – Mosonmagyaróvár (160)

== See also ==
- Roads in Hungary
- Transport in Hungary
- International E-road network
