= Gyarmat =

- Flag Coat of arms

- Location of Győr-Moson-Sopron county in Hungary

- Location of Gyarmat
- Coordinates: 47.46047°N 17.49810°E
- Country: Hungary
- County: Győr-Moson-Sopron

Area
  - Total: 22.45 km^{2} (8.67 sq mi)

Population (2004)
  - Total: 1,289
  - Density: 57.41/km^{2} (148.7/sq mi)
- Time zone: UTC+1 (CET)
  - Summer (DST): UTC+2 (CEST)
- Postal code: 9126
- Area code: 96

Gyarmat is a village in Győr-Moson-Sopron county, Hungary. It is situated in the southeast of its county on the connecting road between the city of Győr (30 km away) and the town Pápa (15 km).

== History ==
It was first mentioned in written sources in 1153. Most of the inhabitants were wine growers and tree fellers. Throughout the history Gyarmat had changed its face. In the times of Ottoman Turkish reign most inhabitants fled because of the beg's oppression. New settlers came from Austria in 1695. During the Rákóczi's War of Independence between 1703 and 1711 the village sustained a great tragedy when an imperial general burned down the village with all its people. Therefore, Gyarmat was destroyed again. In 1720 German catholic settlers came from Rhineland-Palatinate. As a consequence, till today a lot of surnames are not Hungarian. During the First World War the majority of the people were part of the infantry regiment. Between the years 1920 and 1930 about 380 people emigrated to America. World War II hit twice. First came the German troops in March 1944, then followed the Russians in March 1945.

== Sights ==
- Statue of John of Nepomuk
- Calvary
- Roman Catholic Church
- wine-press houses
