= Medveďov =

Medveďov Medve
- Municipality
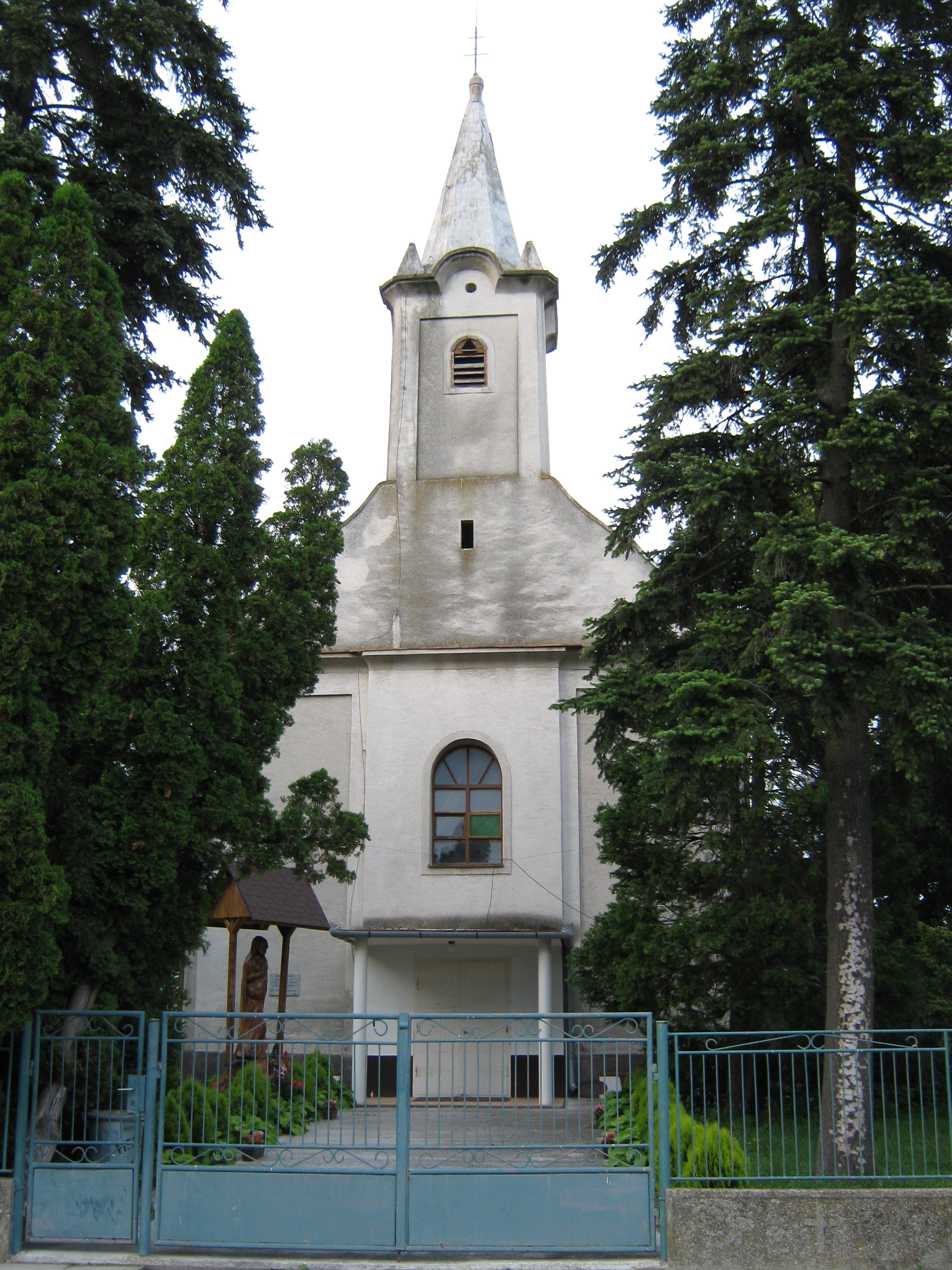

- Flag

- Location of Medveďov in the Trnava Region Location of Medveďov in Slovakia
- Coordinates: 47.80°N 17.66°E
- Country: Slovakia
- Region: Trnava Region
- District: Dunajská Streda District
- First mentioned: 1252

Government
  - Mayor: Ing. Ladislav Kulacs (Party of the Hungarian Coalition)

Area
  - Total: 10.46 km^{2} (4.04 sq mi)
- Elevation: 111 m (364 ft)

Population (2025)
  - Total: 529

Ethnicity
  - Hungarians: 87,31 %
  - Slovaks: 11,15 %
- Time zone: UTC+1 (CET)
  - Summer (DST): UTC+2 (CEST)
- Postal code: 930 07
- Area code: +421 31
- Vehicle registration plate (until 2022): DS
- Website: medvedov.sk

Medveďov (Hungarian: Medve, pronounced [ˈmɛdvɛ]) is a border village and municipality in the Dunajská Streda District in the Trnava Region of south-west Slovakia.

== Geography ==
The municipality lies at an altitude of 111 metres (364 ft) and covers an area of 10.46 km^{2} (4.04 sq mi) (2025). The village lies near the border with Hungary, near the Danube.

== History ==
In the 9th century, the territory of Medveďov became part of the Kingdom of Hungary. The name of the village was first mentioned in 1252 as Willa Medwe castri Posoniensis (Medve village of the Pozsony Castle). Until the end of World War I, the village was part of Hungary and fell within the Tószigetcsilizköz district of Győr County. After the Austro-Hungarian army disintegrated in November 1918, Czechoslovak troops occupied the area. After the Treaty of Trianon of 1920, the village became officially part of Czechoslovakia. In November 1938, the First Vienna Award granted the area to Hungary and it was held by Hungary until 1945. After Soviet occupation in 1945, Czechoslovak administration returned and the village became officially part of Czechoslovakia in 1947. The village suffered a major flood in 1895, 1956 and on 17 June 1965.

== Population ==
Population statistic (10 years)
Year	1995	2005	2015	2025
Count	577	569	536	529
Difference		−1.38%	−5.79%	−1.30%

Population statistic
Year	2024	2025
Count	522	529
Difference		+1.34%

It has a population of 529 people (31 December 2025).

In 1910, the village had 781, for the most part, Hungarian inhabitants.

=== Ethnicity ===
Census 2021 (1+ %)
Ethnicity	Number	Fraction
Hungarian	444	83.45%
Slovak	102	19.17%
Not found out	19	3.57%
Total	532	

In year 2021 was 532 people by ethnicity 444 as Hungarian, 102 as Slovak, 19 as Not found out and 5 as Czech.

Note on population: The difference values of population numbers in the table "Population statistic" and in the sections "Ethnicity" & "Religion" is caused by the use of various statistical methods.

=== Religion ===
Census 2021 (1+ %)
Religion	Number	Fraction
Roman Catholic Church	376	70.68%
None	96	18.05%
Calvinist Church	28	5.26%
Not found out	12	2.26%
Evangelical Church	6	1.13%
Total	532	

In year 2021 was 532 people by religion 376 from Roman Catholic Church, 96 from None, 28 from Calvinist Church, 12 from Not found out, 6 from Evangelical Church, 5 from Greek Catholic Church, 4 from Jehovah's Witnesses, 3 from United Methodist Church, 1 from Other and not ascertained christian church and 1 from Christian Congregations in Slovakia.
