= Vámosszabadi =

Vámossszabadi
- Flag Coat of arms

- Location of Vámosszabadi
- Coordinates: 47.7667°N 17.6500°E
- Country: Hungary
- County: Győr-Moson-Sopron

Area
  - Total: 22.37 km^{2} (8.64 sq mi)

Population (2025)
  - Total: 3,093
  - Density: 48.41/km^{2} (125.4/sq mi)
- Time zone: UTC+1 (CET)
  - Summer (DST): UTC+2 (CEST)
- Website: vamosszabadi.hu

Vámosszabadi is a village in Győr-Moson-Sopron County, Hungary.
