= Vince Stingl =

Hungarian-German businessman (1796–1850)

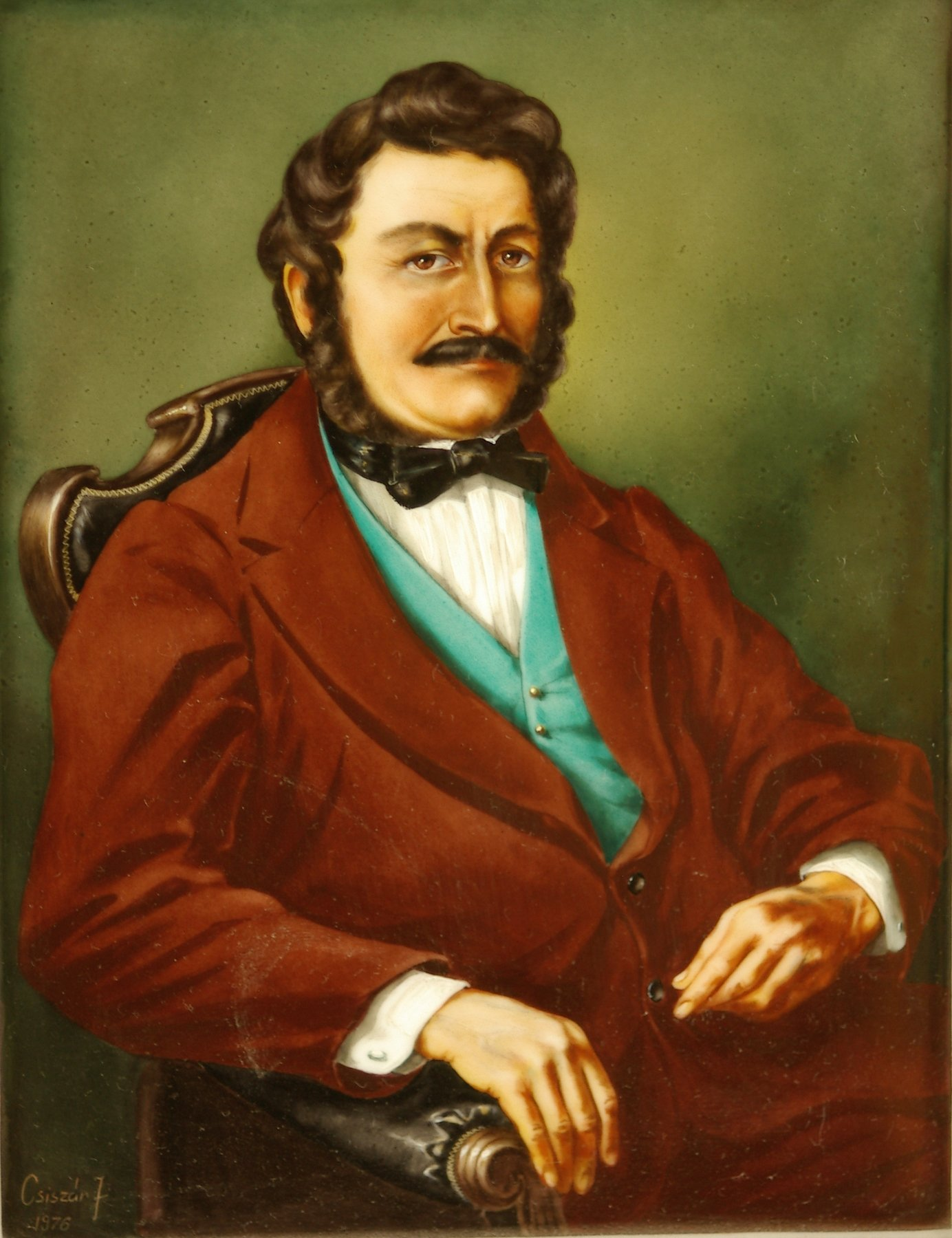
- Born: Vincze (Vincentius) Ferencz Stingl; 23 May 1796; Sopron, Hungary
- Died: Around 1850
- Occupation: Porcelain manufacturer
- Known for: Founder of Herend Porcelain Manufactory
- Board member of: Production manager (Schlögel Stoneware Factory (Schlögel Kőedénygyár)); CEO Herend Porcelain Manufactory (Herendi Porcelánmanufaktúra Zrt.); CEO Városlőd Ceramicsfactory (Városlődi Kerámiagyár)
- Spouse: Anna Pauer (Bauer)
- Children: Alexander; Anna; Johannes Nepomuk; Aloysia; Eduard Károly; Terézia; Emilia
- Parent(s): Leopold Stingl; Catharina Stermenzky

Vince Stingl (born as Vincze (Vincentius) Ferencz Stingl, 23 May 1796 - around 1850) was a Hungarian-German porcelain manufacturer, entrepreneur, industrialist who founded the Herend Porcelain Manufactory in Herend, Hungary.

== Life ==
=== Early years ===
Vince Stingl was born on 23 May 1796 in Sopron to Leopold Stingl and Catharina Stermenzky.

Stingl's grandfather Casparus Stingl (son of Christoph Stingl) moved from Hätzenren, Bohemia, to Sopron, where he got citizen rights on 19 January 1748 and worked as a coppersmith. He had six daughters: Anna Maria (1745-1791), Theresia (1747-?), Maria Elisabeth (1750-?), Magdalena (1752-?), Susanna (1755-?), Catharina (1760-1819) and one son, Leopold (1755-) who inherited his father's job. He lived in the 515 Würtshaus Gasse (today 56 Várkerület) with his wife, Catharina Stermenzky and their eleven children Mathias (1786-1806), Theresia (1787-?), Theresia (1789-?), Leopoldus (1791-), Aloysia(1794-?), Maria Catharina (1797-?), Maria (1800-?), Anna Catharina (1802-1803), Nepomuk Johann (1804-?), Anna Jozefa (1806-?) and Vince. His father was a coppersmith.

In 1807 Vince's father died. His sons were too young to take over the father's job and they don't want to work as coppersmith, because at that time other types of bowls and dishes especially ceramics were spreading. His mother moved with the children to Pápa, Hungary where they started to study cardpainting. In Pápa Vince worked also as card painter.

Stingl learnt first in Vienna and then from 1814 in Pápa tile production before he became the production manager of the Schlögel Stoneware Factory (Schlögel Kőedénygyár) in Tata, Komárom, Hungary at the age of 23.

=== Herend Porcelain Manufactory ===
Then he moved to Herend, Veszprém, Hungary where he bought land and founded his own earthenware and stoneware pottery manufacture in 1826 which became later the well-known Herend Porcelain Manufactory.

The company's main products were at the beginning only stoneware and earthware especially chimney bricks. According to some sources he made several experiments to make lighter porcelain.

In Europe until the 17th century there were just heavy folk pottery produced and only the wealthiest could afford to have fine, thin tablewares on their tables. These porcelain products were all imported from China by ship. Around 1705 a German alchemist, Johann Bottger discovered a method of producing porcelain which resulted in the establishment of several new manufactures across Europe.

In 1839 because of financial difficulties he sold some of his shares to Mór Fischer. After a year in 1840 Fischer bought the whole company because Stingl was in lack of capital and could not continue to operate the factory.

Stingl stayed not long there as the head of the company after the sale.

=== Városlődi Kerámiagyár ===
Around 1830 he and his relative Károly Stingl founded the Városlőd Ceramicsfactory (Városlődi Kerámiagyár) in the next village, Városlőd, Veszprém, Hungary. Dishes, flasks, vases and flower pots were produced there with typical Hungarian decorations. Earlier he wanted to move his other factory from Herend to Városlőd, but he did not get a permission from the bishopric for that. Despite the growing business he ran out of money in 1840 so he sold the enterprise to János György Mayer.

According to some sources he worked as a barkeeper during the last years of his life.

== Personal life ==
He married Anna Pauer (Bauer) and lived in Szentgál, a neighbouring village to Herend. They were both members of the Roman Catholic Church. They had together three sons and four daughters:

- Alexander (11 January 1830 - 11 July 1830)
- Anna (10 February 1831 - ?)
- Johannes Nepomuk (21 April 1832 -)
- Aloysia (21 September 1833 - 8 March 1835)
- Eduard Károly (19 May 1835 - 1894)
- Terézia (2 October 1836-)
- Emilia (18 July 1840 - 16 January 1842)

== See also ==
- Herend Porcelain Manufactory
