= Duna-Gerecse Area =

Area in Komárom-Esztergom County, Hungary

The Duna-Gerecse area is located in Hungary on the territory of the Komárom-Esztergom County on the right side of the Danube at the Slovak border. The area is not an independent administrative entity, it basically consists of the surroundings of three major cities – Komárom, Tatabánya and Tata.

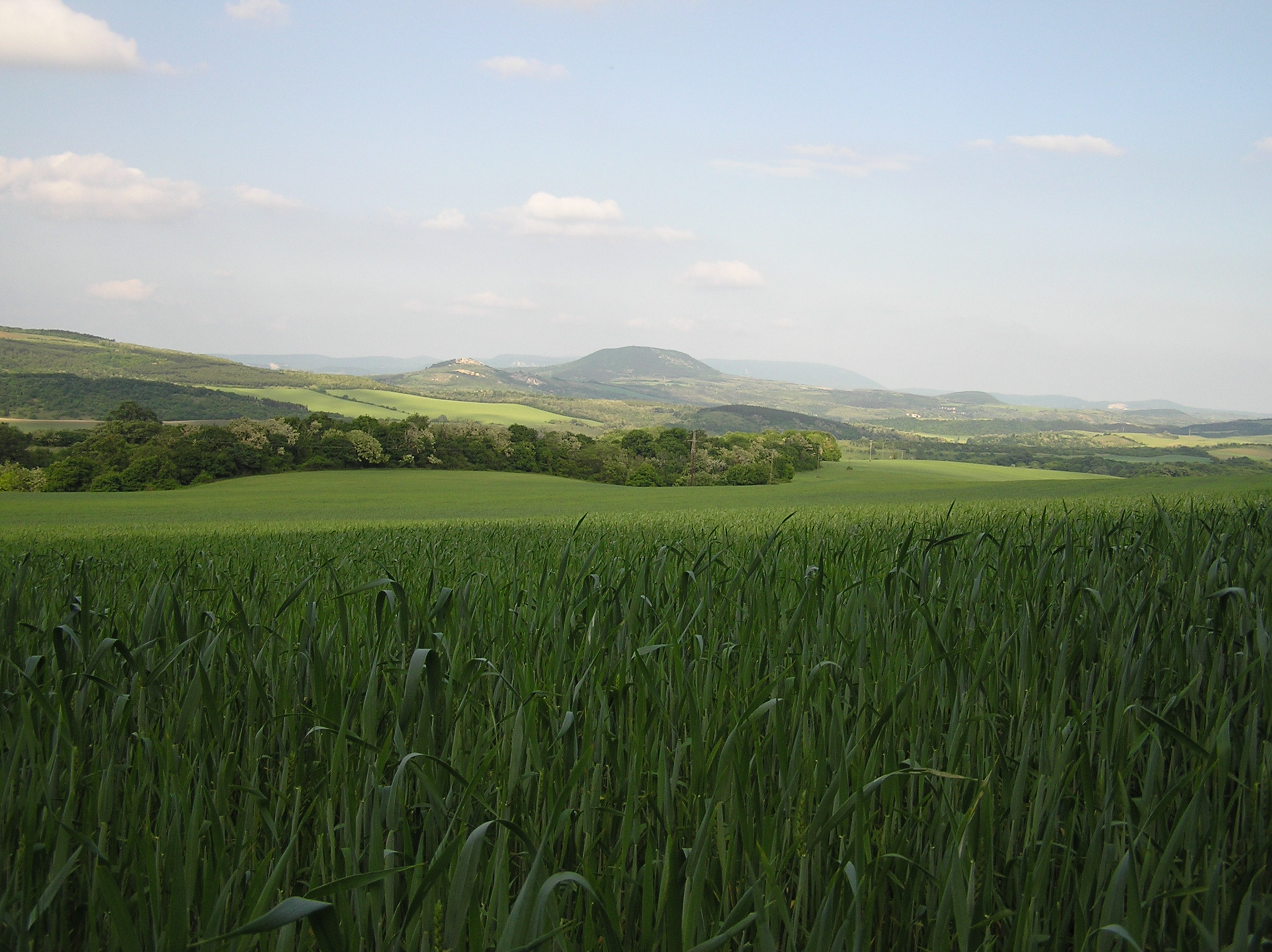
Gerecse hills Hungary

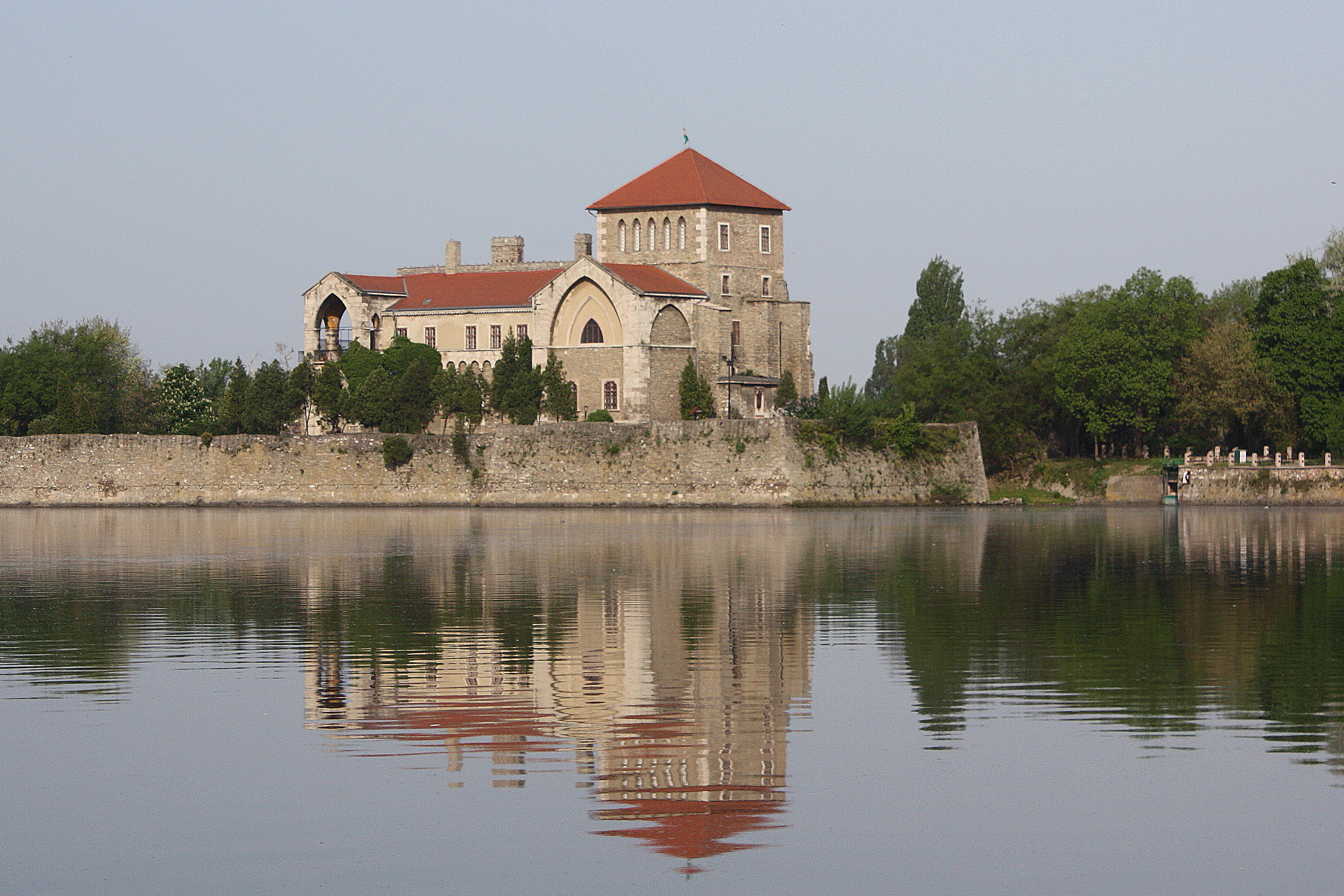
Tata Castle

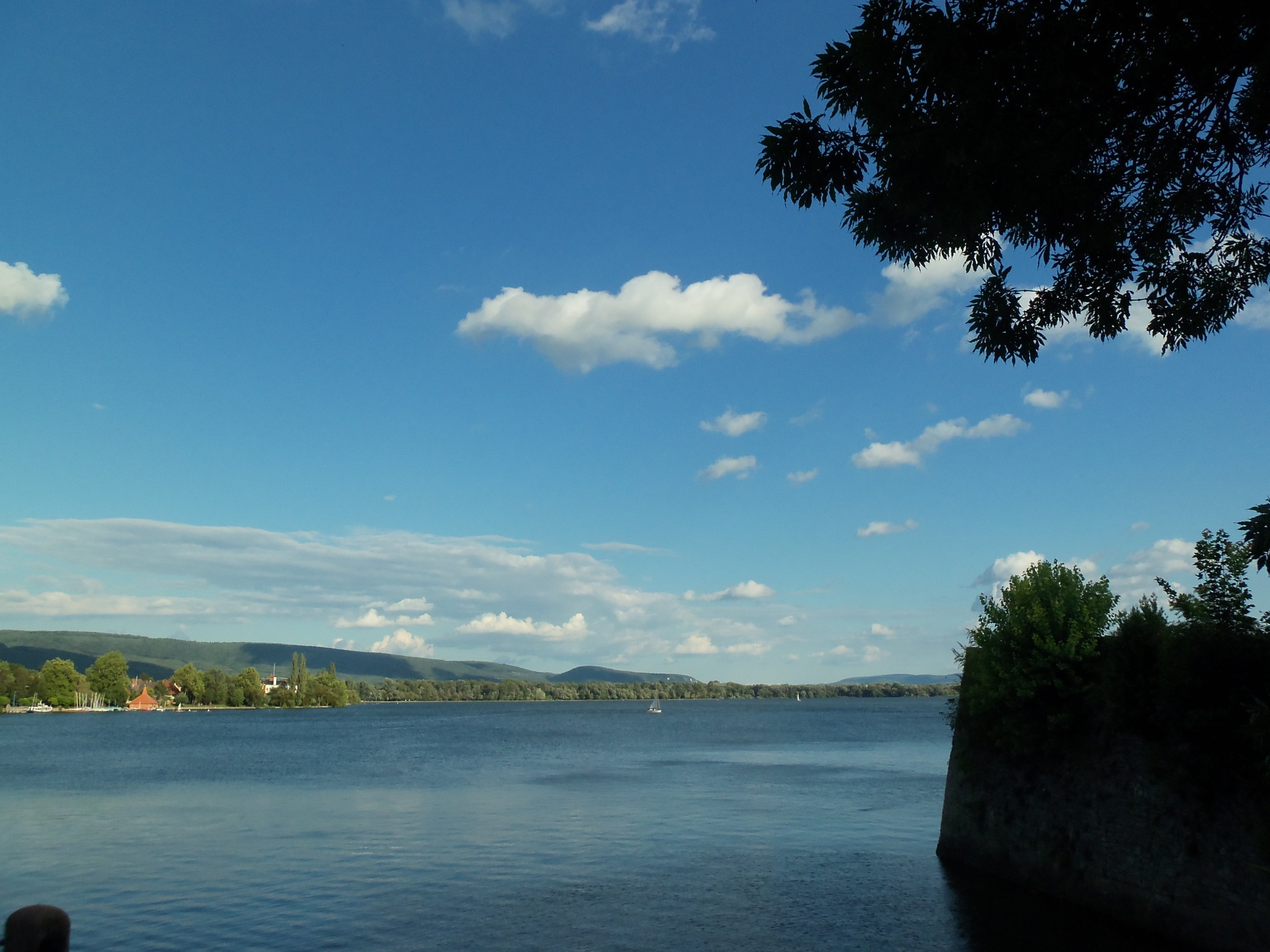
Tata - Öreg-lake from the Castle

The biggest city is the fairly young Tatabánya which was founded in 1947 by the merger of three small townships. With approximately 72,000 inhabitants and a history of mining and heavy industry, the town became the capital of the county in 1950. Another big city of the area is Komárom with a population of about 20,000. It is a natural local centre of tourism and trade due to its favorable location at the Slovak border. The town’s value in tourism is partly based on its healing water and baths.

The cultural centre of the area is the more than 700-year-old town Tata. The city had its peak in the 15th century under the reign of the great Hungarian King Mátyás Hunyadi. The count of Esterhazy family also made a great impact on the life and current look of the city in the next centuries. Probably the most popular tourist attraction of Tata is the Castle from the 14th century settled next to another sight, the Old Lake. The English garden which takes in almost the whole city comes from the Esterhazys. The cultural life of Tata is demonstrated by museums like the Outdoor Museum of Geology, the Kuny Domonkos Museum or the German Gentilitial Museum. The Tata Castle was raised in the 18th century and hosted historical events like the signing of the "Treaty of Schönnbrunn” by Kaiser Ferencz (1809).

The area has many historical relics mostly from the Romans. The village called Vértesszőlős became famous after the scruff-bone of a "homo erectus” (named Samu) had been found in the territory in 1965.

A great Hungarian poet, Mihály Csokonai Vitéz, is also linked to the area since his love and muse Júlia Vajda (Lilla) lived and got buried here at Dunaalmás. A sculpture of the poet is one of the sights of the village.

The natural aptitudes of the area are outstanding, the main national tourist routes (Blue, Red, Yellow, Green) cross the territory just as well as some IVV routes. The Blue-route touches the Nagy-Gete hill and the "hovering rock” of the Old Stone (altitude: 375 m) where rock climbing is a popular activity nowadays. The 20-25.000 years old relics of the Jankovich cave are also to be found here.

Popular tourist destination points are The King-well spring and the Gerecse-hilltop because even the far-placed Basilica of Esztergom can be seen from the Big- and Small-Gerecse according to weather. The area contains one of the most important centers of the Hungarian horse breeding culture, Bábolna. The history of the place and the equestrian activity can be seen at the local museum.

== Towns in the neighborhood ==
Ács, Almásfüzítő, Annavölgy, Bábolna, Baj, Bajna, Bajót, Bana, Csém, Csolnok, Dág, Dorog, Dunaalmás, Dunaszentmiklós, Epöl, Gyermely, Héreg, Kisigmánd, Kocs, Komárom, Lábatlan, Leányvár, Máriahalom, Mocsa, Mogyorósbánya, Nagyigmánd, Nagysáp, Naszály, Neszmély, Nyergesújfalu, Sárisáp, Süttő, Szomód, Szomor, Tardos, Tarján, Tát, Tata, Tatabánya, Tokod, Tokodaltáró, Úny, Vértestolna, Vértesszőlős

== Interesting facts ==
- The Szent Ilona bay at Neszmély has a special Skanzen of boats to exhibit one of the last steamboats made in Hungary.
- The name of the village "Kocs" comes from the word kocsi (carriage) due to the relevant expertise of the citizens of the old time.
- 12 water-mills operated at Tata in the 15th century
- Júlia Vajda (Lilla), the love and muse of the great Hungarian poet Mihály Csokonai Vitéz lived and got buried at Dunaalmás.
- Zoltán Czibor was a member of the national football team of Hungary (Golden Team) beating the English squad by 6:3 at the Wembley in 1954. An exhibition of his legacy can be seen at the Sport Club of Komárom.
- The only naval exhibition of Hungary can be seen at Komárom.Source:
