= Johanna Bischitz von Heves =

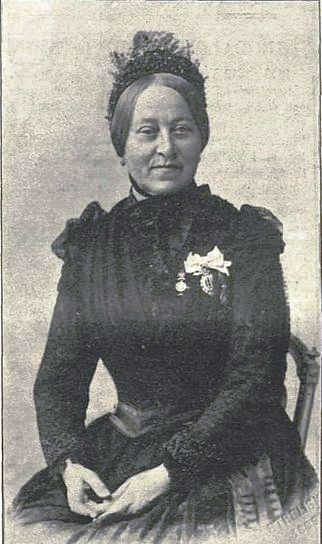
Johanna Bischitz von Heves

Hevesi/y Bischitz Johanna, or Johanna Bischitz de Heves (1827 in Tata – 28 March 1898 in Budapest) was a Hungarian philanthropist.

She was a daughter of Herend porcelain manufacturer Móric Fischer, and wife of David Bischitz. She was the founder and president of the Jewish Women's Association, and the Jewish People's Kitchen, of Budapest; vice-president of the Christian "Maria Dorothea Charitable Union", member of the committee of the Red Cross Society and honorary member and honorary president of more than 100 philanthropic societies of the province. In 1867 Baron Moritz de Hirsch founded at her instance and gave into her charge a relief bureau in Budapest, as a center for Hungary, placing at her disposal a yearly sum of 120,000 florins for distribution among the poor. During her presidency, more than ƒ3,000,000 were distributed. Her philanthropic labors were not only recognized by Emperor Francis Joseph I, who twice decorated her, but were acknowledged by King Leopold I of Belgium.

She was a member of the House of Bischitz von Heves, a Hungarian Jewish nobility, same with the chemist Hevesy-Bischitz György, or György Bischitz von(de) Heves.

Bischitz is a German name of Bohemian town Byšice (north of Brandeis, east of Neratovice/Lobkovice, and southeast of Mělník; jpg).

== See also ==
- George de Hevesy
