= Herend =

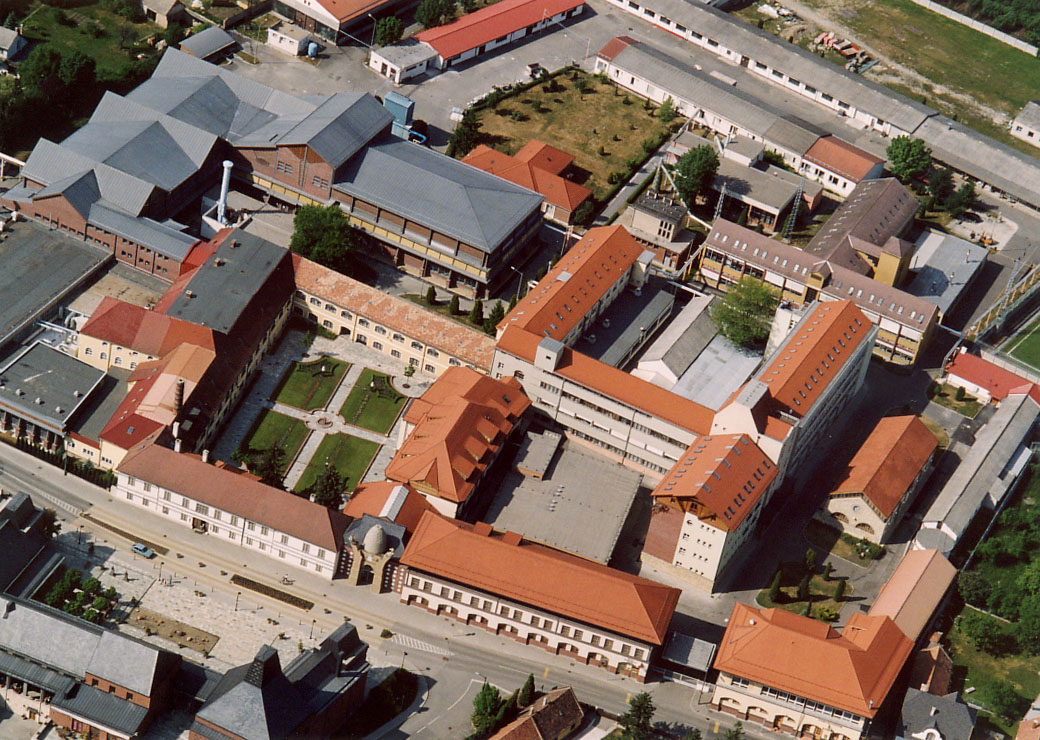
- Aerial photograph of the Herend Porcelain Manufactory

- Flag Coat of arms

- Location in Hungary
- Coordinates: 47°07′58″N 17°45′05″E
- Country: Hungary
- County: Veszprém

Area
  - Total: 19.53 km^{2} (7.54 sq mi)

Population (2015)
  - Total: 3,384
  - Density: 173.3/km^{2} (448.8/sq mi)
- Time zone: UTC+1 (CET)
  - Summer (DST): UTC+2 (CEST)
- Postal code: 8440
- Area code: 88

Herend (German: Herrendorf) is a small town in Hungary (Europe), near the city of Veszprém.

The history of the town goes back into Roman times, indicated by the findings near the precincts of the town, while in the Middle Ages a few villages occupied the area where the current town stands. After the Ottoman Turkish administration of Hungary, the then-village was largely emptied, but the Barren of Herend was repopulated between 1764 and 1847.

== Herend Porcelain Manufactory ==
The town is most famous for its long tradition of excellent porcelain manufacturing. Founded in 1826, Herend Porcelain Manufactory is one of the world's largest ceramic factories, specializing in luxury hand painted and gilded porcelain. In the mid-19th century it was purveyor to the Habsburg Dynasty and aristocratic customers throughout Europe. Many of its classic patterns are still in production. After the fall of communism in Hungary the factory was privatised and is now 75% owned by its management and workers, exporting to over 60 countries of the world. Prince William, Duke of Cambridge and Catherine Middleton received a special painted Herend Porcelain as wedding gift from Hungary on 29 April 2011.

== Sights to see ==
The Porcelain Museum of Herend has been opened to visitors since 1964 and was chosen as the museum of the year 2002 in Hungary.

== Population ==
The racial makeup of Herend was 87.5% Hungarian, 11.03% German, 1% Romani, 0.2% Romanian.

== Religion ==
The religious distribution of the town is 47.1% Roman Catholic, 49.5% Hungarian Reformed Church, 1.8% Evangelical, 1.6% irreligious.

== Notable residents ==
- Vince Stingl (1796 - around 1850), porcelain manufacturer, businessman, founder of the Herend Porcelain Manufactory
- Móric Fischer de Farkasházy (1799-1880), businessman, investor, industrialist, owner of the Herend Porcelain Manufactory
- Johanna Bischitz von Heves (1827-1898), philanthropist
- Eugen Fischer de Farkasházy (1861-1926), investor, businessman, owner of the Herend Porcelain Manufactory

== Gallery ==
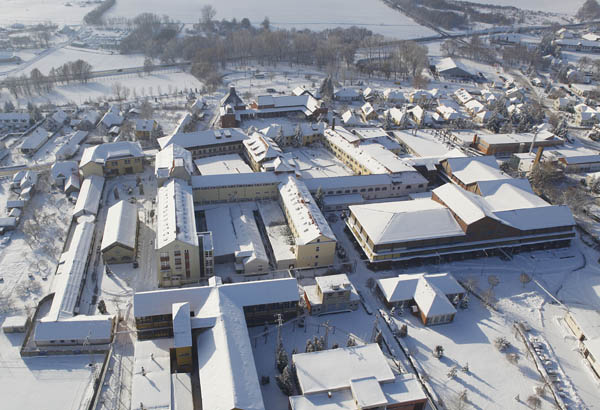
Herend by winter

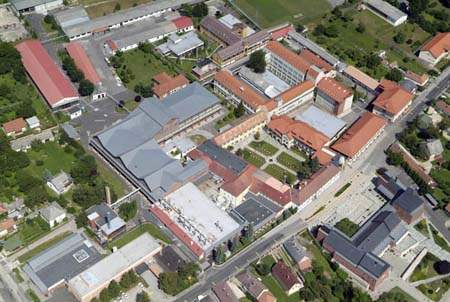

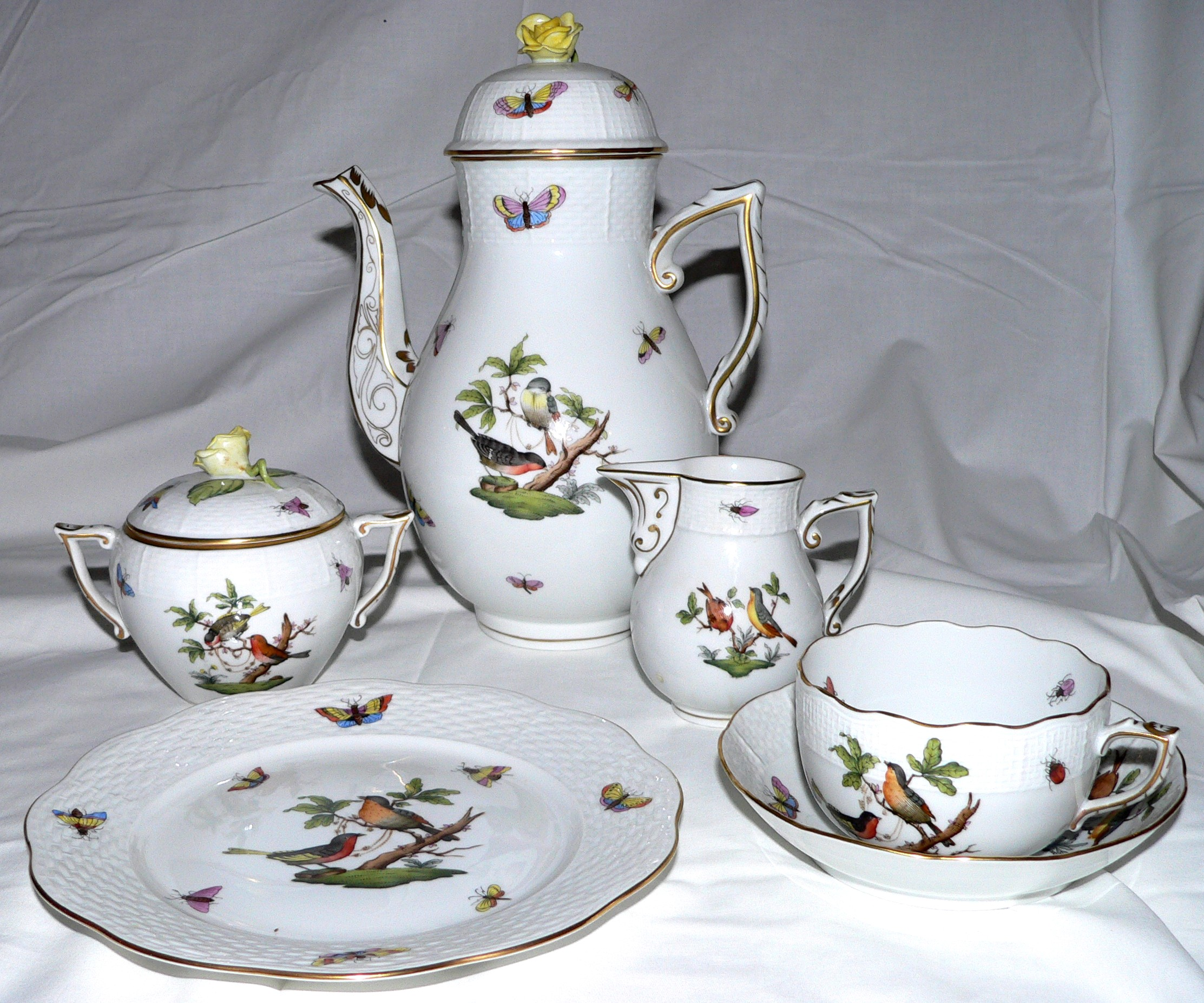

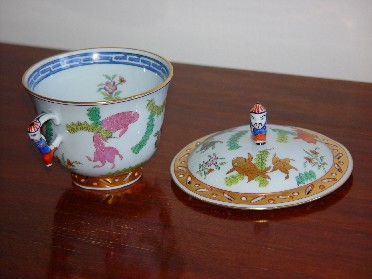
