= Lake Öreg =

Lake in Hungary

- Öreg-tó (Hungarian)
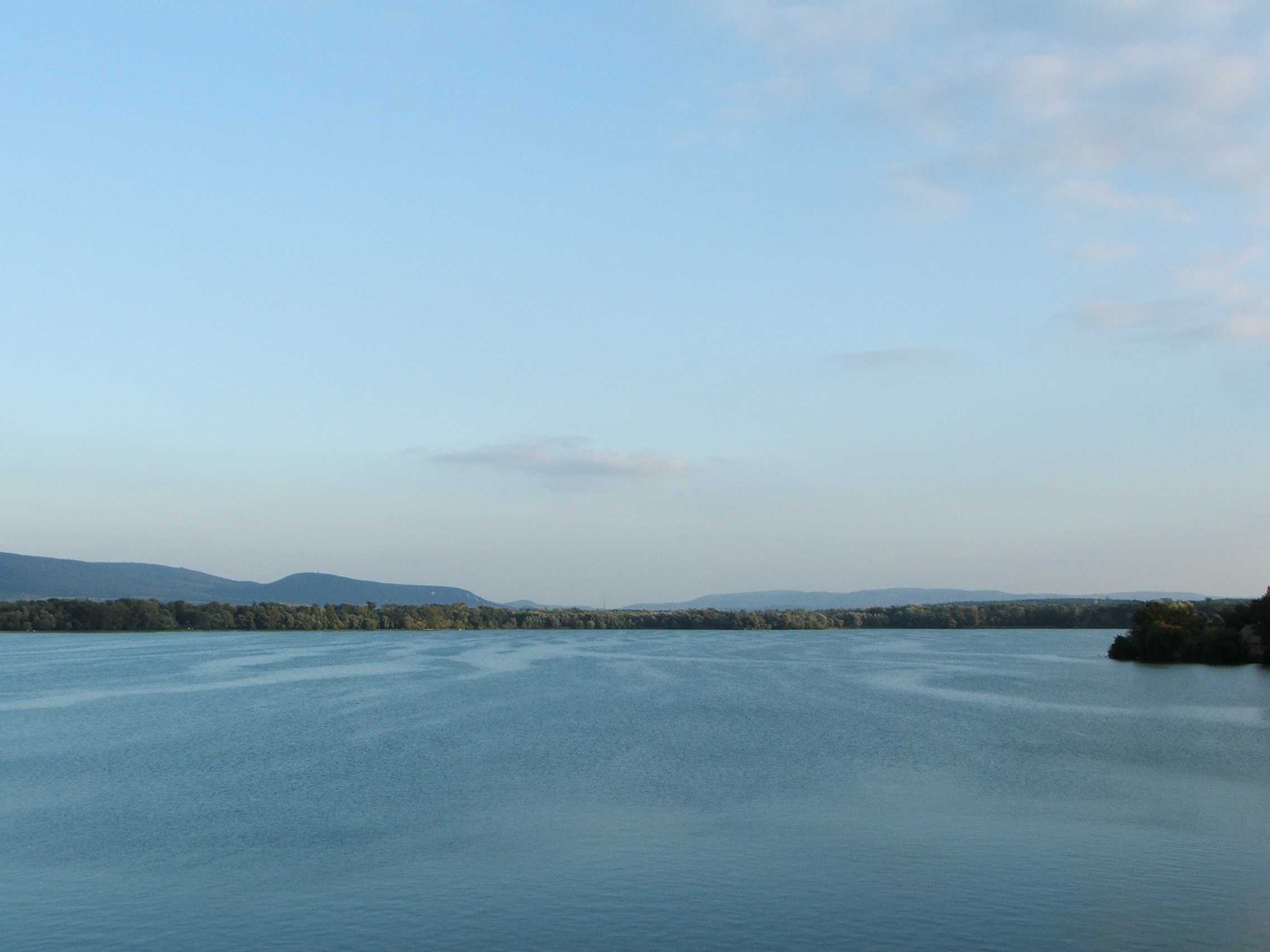

- Location within Hungary
- Location: Tata, Hungary
- Coordinates: 47°38′24″N 18°19′45″E
- Primary inflows: Által brook
- Primary outflows: Által brook
- Basin countries: Hungary
- Surface area: 2.69 km^{2} (1.04 sq mi)
- Max. depth: 5 m (16 ft)
- Surface elevation: 129 m (423 ft)

Lake Öreg (meaning "old lake") (Hungarian: Öreg-tó) is a lake near Tata, Hungary.

== Location ==
The lake is situated in the middle of the town of Tata. Adjoining the South-east quarter of the lake is a wooded area. It is fed by the Által-brook (Hungarian: Által-ér) from the south-east, which then leaves it in a Northerly direction through the town until it eventually reaches the Danube.

On the lake's shores lie Tata Castle and the Esterházy Palace.
