= Tivadar Farkasházy =

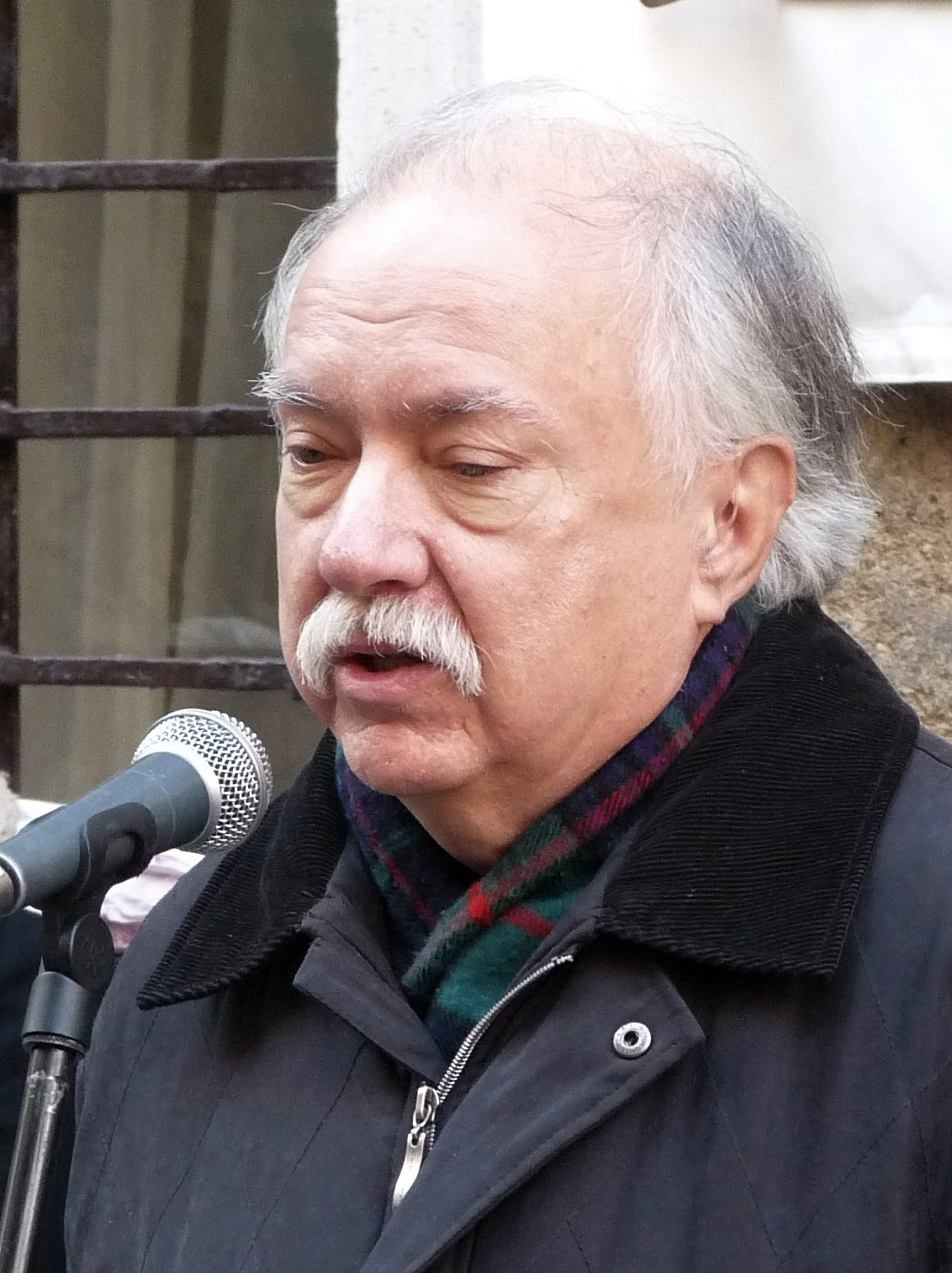
- Farkasházy in 2013
- Born: 15 December 1945 (age 80); Budapest, Hungary
- Education: Corvinus University of Budapest
- Occupations: Humorist; author; journalist
- Website: farkashazy.hu

Tivadar Farkasházy (nickname "Teddy") (born 15 December 1945) is a Hungarian humorist, author, and journalist.

== Biography ==
He graduated at Corvinus University of Budapest majoring in economical planning/mathematics in 1969, and earned his doctoral title. He was one of the Hungarian investment bank's economists from 1969 to 1972, after that he was a journalist at a university magazine, titled "Közgazdász" ("Economist"). From 1973 he was the director of the "Vidám Színpad", later the director of the "Mikroszkóp Színpad". In 1974 he was the winner of Magyar Rádió's first humourfestival. From 1975 he was the editor of the Rádiókabaré. From 1989 he is owner, editor, and frequent contributor to the satirical political biweekly Hócipő (Overshoe). 14 of his books have been published.

He was jailed for one night (26/27 March 2007), rather than paying a traffic fine.

== Family ==
He is married. His wife, Noémi Benedek (nickname "Mimi", after the La bohème's Mimi) is a master violin-maker (as is her father). He has children and twin grandchildren. He is famous because of his big family (based on his stories, which he says in the Heti Hetes, he has many family members). His family members are Lippo Hertzka, Móric Farkasházi Fischer and many others.

== Appearances in Heti Hetes ==
He is one of the permanent members of the weekly show "Heti Hetes" (Hungarian version of 7 Tage, 7 Köpfe). He sits on the seventh place. He was in the first Heti Hetes in 1999. He's best known for his long stories. He is one of the most popular members in this show. The other members often joke about his stories, because (based on his stories) he was in so many places and many different events.

== Awards ==
- Winner of the Magyar Rádió's first humourfestival (1974)
- Karinthy-ring (1986)
- Opus-prize (1991)
- Hungarian Pulitzer Prize (1992)
- Maecenas-prize (1993)
- Collective (Hungarian) Pulitzer Prize (2000)

== Books ==
- Overdose - a veretlen 11 (2008) – The book's website
- Bobby visszatér avagy a Fischer-rejtély (2008) – The book's website
- 32 figura - a sakk regénye (2007) – The book's website
- Zsokékrul – a lóverseny regénye (2006) – The book's website
- Ír Úr – avagy búcsú a kabarétól (2004) – The book's website
- A kék mauritius (2002) – The book's website
- Fülig Jimmy kiadott és kiadatlan levelei (2002)
- Hét és fél (2001)
- Hetedik (2000)
- Fülig Jimmy kiadatlan levelei (1998)
- Atlasszal Hócipőben (1995)
- Nem Értem (1994)
- Tévések végjátéka (1989)
- Mitisír a hogyishívják (1988)
- 22 Bolond a Rádiókabaréból (1987)

== Sources and notes ==
This page is (partly) translated from the Hungarian Wikipedia article.
