= Eugen Fischer de Farkasházy =

Hungarian porcelain factory owner

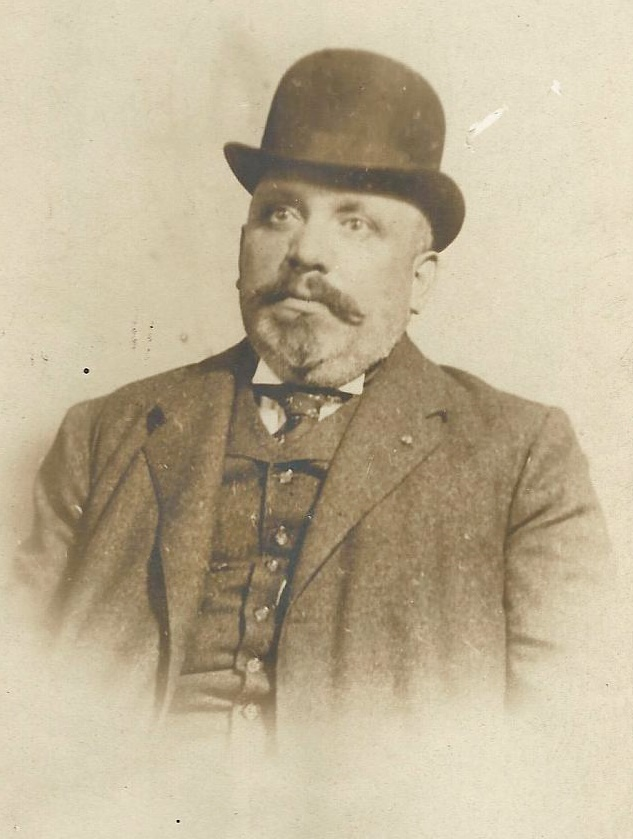
- Born: Farkasházi Fischer Jenő; 29 March 1861; Székesfehérvár, Fejér, Kingdom of Hungary, Austrian Empire
- Died: 4 May 1926 (aged 65); Herend, Veszprém, Kingdom of Hungary
- Education: Beaux-Arts de Paris
- Occupations: Porcelain factory owner, Ceramicist, author and CEO of the Herend Porcelain Manufactory
- Parent(s): Desider Fischer de Farkasháza (father); Mary Pressburger (mother)
- Relatives: Dr. Zsigmond Farkasházy (brother); Móric Fischer de Farkasházy (grandfather); Maria Salzer (grandmother); Mór Fischer, Hugo Fischer, and Eugene Fischer (grandchildren)

Eugen Fischer de Farkasházy (born Farkasházi Fischer Jenő; 29 March 1861 – 4 May 1926) was a Hungarian porcelain factory owner, ceramicist, and author. His brother, Dr. Zsigmond Farkasházy (1874–1928), was a politician, journalist, MP, and lawyer.

== Early life ==
He was a member of the noble Jewish Farkasházi Fischer family. He was the grandson of Móric Fischer de Farkasházy and Maria Salzer. His father was Desider Fischer de Farkasháza (1827?–1914) and his Jewish mother was Mary Pressburger. He studied at the Ecole des Beaux-Arts and conducted over eight years of porcelain production.

Having knowledge of the England and Germany was expanded, the Ungvári porcelángyár (Uzhgorod), 1897 – but devoted his excellent knowledge of the Herend Porcelain Manufactory and workforce onwards. He went where his grandfather left off the old China's, Japan's, Meissen's, Vienna and Sèvres i samples based on Herend genre cultivated, and this area has achieved such results in which the traditions of old factories scattered again. The 1900s Paris World Exhibition inspired by modern forms and techniques. Coulon was a great success and pâte-sur-pâte porcelain decoration of users which he designed and painted. Literary work area as well, two major monographs written: The life and works of Palissy (1885), The Della Robbia family (1896). He died as CEO of the Herend porcelain factory stock company.

In 1904 his three grandchildren Mór Fischer, Hugo Fischer, and Eugene Fischer lawyer, member of parliament and Farkasházi Lieutenant Alexander Fischer has been granted by Franz Joseph I of Austria from the surname Fischer changed Farkasházy over, with the noble vorname, "farkasházi", retaining

== Sources ==
- PIM

== More information ==
- Sziklay János: Dunántúli kulturmunkások. A Dunántúl művelődéstörténete életrajzokban. Bp., Dunántúli Közművelődési Egyesület, 1941
- Művészeti lexikon. Ed. Éber László. Co-editor Gombosi György. 2nd corr. ed. Bp., 1935. Győző ny.
- Gulyás Pál: Magyar írók élete és munkái. Bp., Magyar Könyvtárosok és Levéltárosok Egyesülete, 1939–2002
- Művészeti lexikon. Managing ed. Lajta Edit. Bp., Akadémiai Kiadó, 1965–1968
- Kempelen Béla: Magyar nemes családok. Bp., Grill Károly Könyvkiadóvállalata, 1911–1932
- Magyar Nagylexikon. Editor in chief Élesztős László (1–5. k.), Berényi Gábor (6. k.), Bárány Lászlóné (8-). Bp., Akadémiai Kiadó, 1993–
- Magyarországi zsidó és zsidó eredetű családok. Ed. Kempelen Béla. Bp., author's edition, 1937–1939
- Magyar zsidó lexikon. Ed. Ujvári Péter. Bp., Zsidó Lexikon, 1929
- Szinnyei József: Magyar írók élete és munkái. Bp., 1891–1914. Hornyánszky Viktor
- Veszprém megyei életrajzi lexikon. Editor in chief Varga Béla. Veszprém, Veszprém Megyei Önkormányzatok Közgyűlése, 1998
- Zsidó kultúrtörténeti emlékek Fejér megyében. Székesfehérvár, Szent István Király Múzeum, 2004. május 20. – 23 December. The exhibition was organized and the study by Anna Gergely. Székesfehérvár, 2004
- Berényi Zsuzsanna Ágnes: Budapest és a szabadkőművesség. Bp., author's edition, 2005
