= Slavko Wolf =

Croatian lawyer, chess player and writer

- Born: Samuel Wolf; 26 December 1862; Tata, Komárom County, Kingdom of Hungary
- Died: 7 November 1936 (aged 73); Zagreb, Kingdom of Yugoslavia, (now Croatia)
- Education: University of Vienna
- Spouse: Janka (née Granitz) Wolf
- Children: Pavao Vuk-Pavlović (son)
- Relatives: Benjamin and Matilda (née Ebenspanger) Wolf (parents)

Slavko Wolf (born Samuel Wolf, Yiddish: שְׁמוּאֵל װאָלףֿ; 26 December 1862 – 7 November 1936) was a Croatian lawyer, chess player and writer.

Wolf was born on 26 December 1862 in Tata, in Komárom-Esztergom County of the Kingdom of Hungary to Jewish parents, Benjamin and Matilda (née Ebenspanger) Wolf. Soon after his birth Wolf family moved to Vukovar, Croatia where Wolf was raised together with his brothers Dragutin and Leopold. His father was hazzan at the Vukovar Synagogue, rosh yeshiva and secretary of the Vukovar Jewish community. Later he was also a rabbi in Ludbreg for 10 years. Wolf attended the Vukovar Yeshiva led by his father. In autumn of 1871, after his education at Yeshiva, Wolf began to attend the Vinkovci Gymnasium. Last three grades he finished at the Osijek Gymnasium from where he graduated in 1879. That same year in autumn he started studying law at the Faculty of Law University of Vienna. Wolf graduated from the university in 1883. In Vienna he also obtained his doctorate.

After his graduation Wolf worked as a trainee solicitor in Bjelovar. Later he worked as a lawyer in Koprivnica, and representative at the Koprivnica City Assembly. He owned a law firm. In 1893 Wolf married Janka (née Granitz), a daughter of known Hungarian-born Croatian Jewish industrialist Ignjat Granitz. Their son Pavao Vuk-Pavlović was born in 1894.

After his parents death, his mother died in 1891 and father in 1899, Wolf and his wife converted to Catholic faith in 1900. Through his years he stayed connected with Judaism and Jewish community in Koprivnica and Zagreb. Wolf and his family lived in Koprivnica until 1910, after they moved to Zagreb. He practised law until 1931. After his father in law company "Ignjat Granitz & Comp." was merged with the printing house of Ivan Novak, to found the Graphic and Publishing Bureau "Tipografija d.d.", Wolf became a lifetime president of the newly founded company. Wolf hobby was chess. In 1935 he published the book "Šahovski problemi za početnike" (Chess problems for beginners) about chess problem. During World War II Wolf's wife survived the Holocaust with the help of her sons former students. Wolf died on 7 November 1936 and was buried at the Mirogoj Cemetery.

== Works ==
- Šahovski problemi za početnike, Tipografija d.d., Zagreb (1935)

== Bibliography ==
- Polić, Milan (2001). Život i djelo Pavla Vuk - Pavlovića. Zagreb: Biblioteka filozofska istraživanja. ISBN 953-164-069-6.
- Goldstein, Ivo (2005). Židovi u Zagrebu 1918 - 1941. Zagreb: Novi Liber. ISBN 953-6045-23-0.
