= Tata Castle =

Coordinates: 47°38′56″N 18°19′10″E

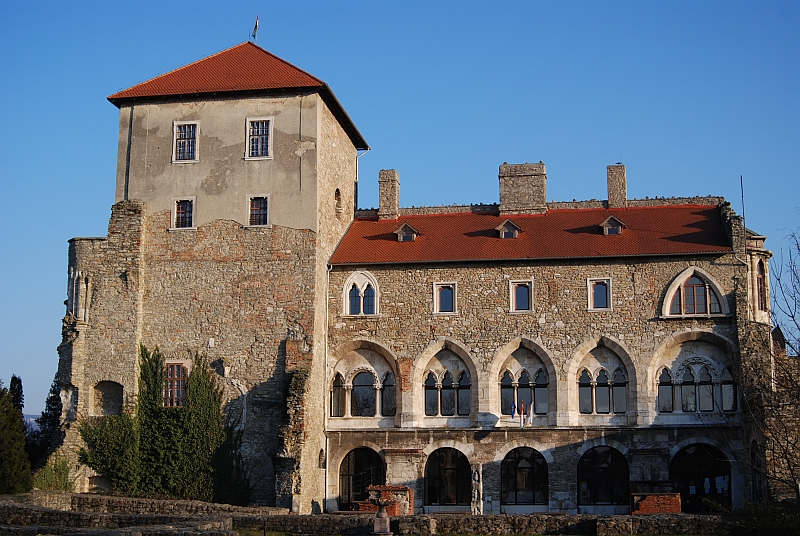
The capital building, from the yard taking a photo.

Tata Castle, built at the mid 14th-century on the northern tip of Lake Öreg (Old Lake), is one of the jewels of Tata, Hungary. Its blooming can be dated to the reign of Sigismund of Luxembourg (r. 1433–1437) and Mátyás Hunyadi (r. 1458–1490) as the summer resort of the king and a favoured residence. It was burnt by Habsburgs and later renovated. The walls of the castle reflect the marks of romantic style which is due to the Esterházy family who used to live here.

== In popular culture ==
Parts of the Bollywood film Raabta (2017) and The Witcher TV series were shot at the castle.
