= Dunaalmás =

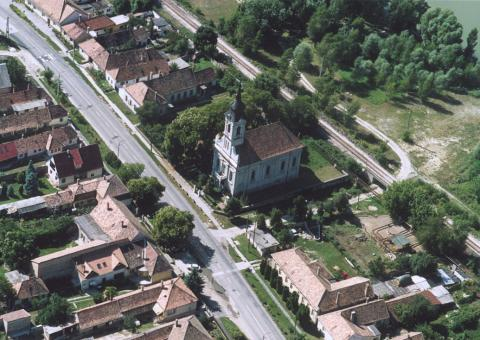
- Aerial photography of Dunaalmás

- Location of Komárom-Esztergom county in Hungary

- Location of Dunaalmás
- Coordinates: 47.7269°N 18.3255°E
- Country: Hungary
- County: Komárom-Esztergom

Area
  - Total: 14.77 km^{2} (5.70 sq mi)

Population (2004)
  - Total: 1,661
  - Density: 112.45/km^{2} (291.2/sq mi)
- Time zone: UTC+1 (CET)
  - Summer (DST): UTC+2 (CEST)
- Postal code: 2545
- Area code: 34

Dunaalmás is a village in Komárom-Esztergom county, Hungary.

== See also ==
- Duna-Gerecse Area
