= Herend Porcelain Manufactory =

Hungarian manufacturing company

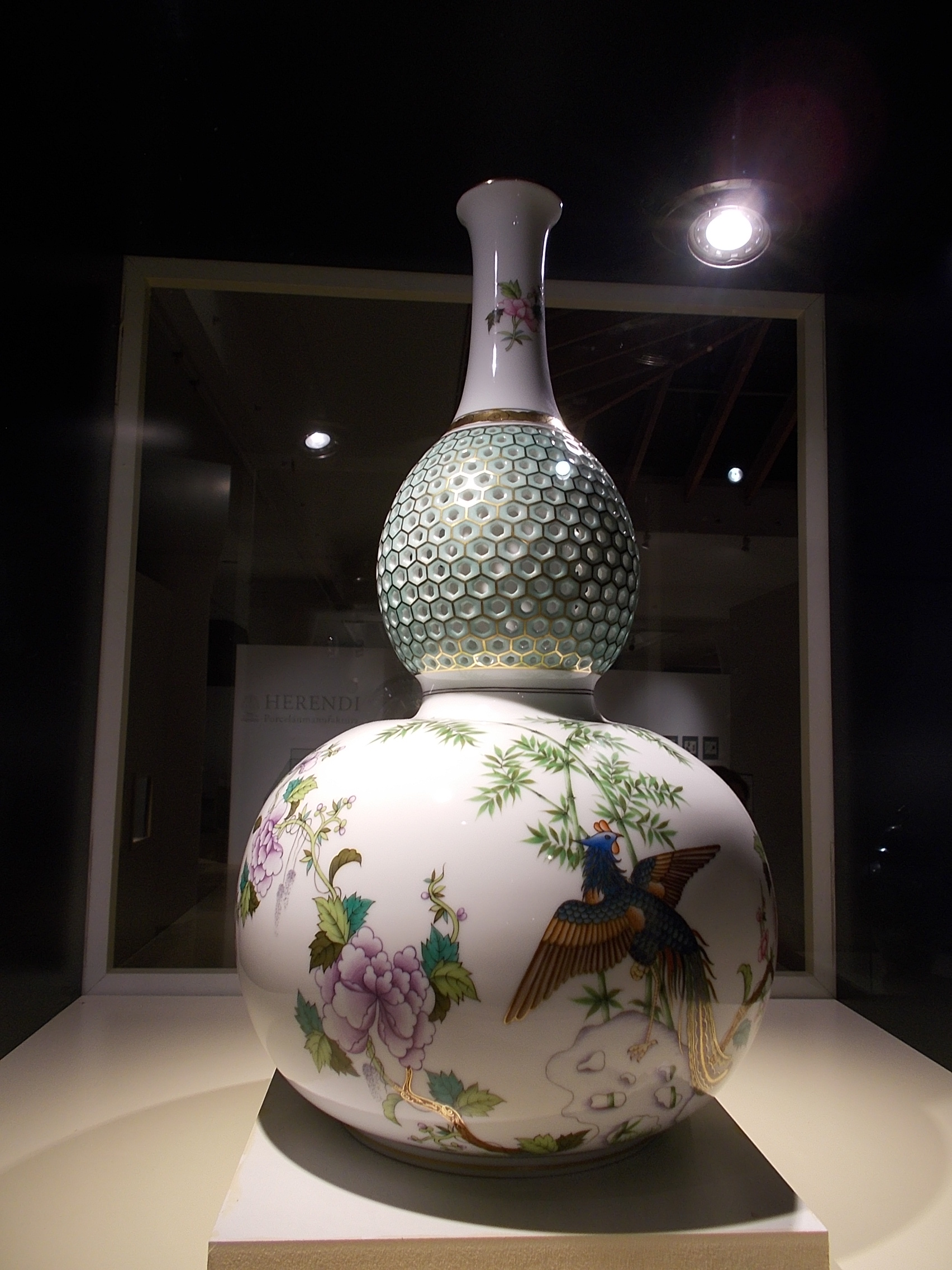
Herend vase

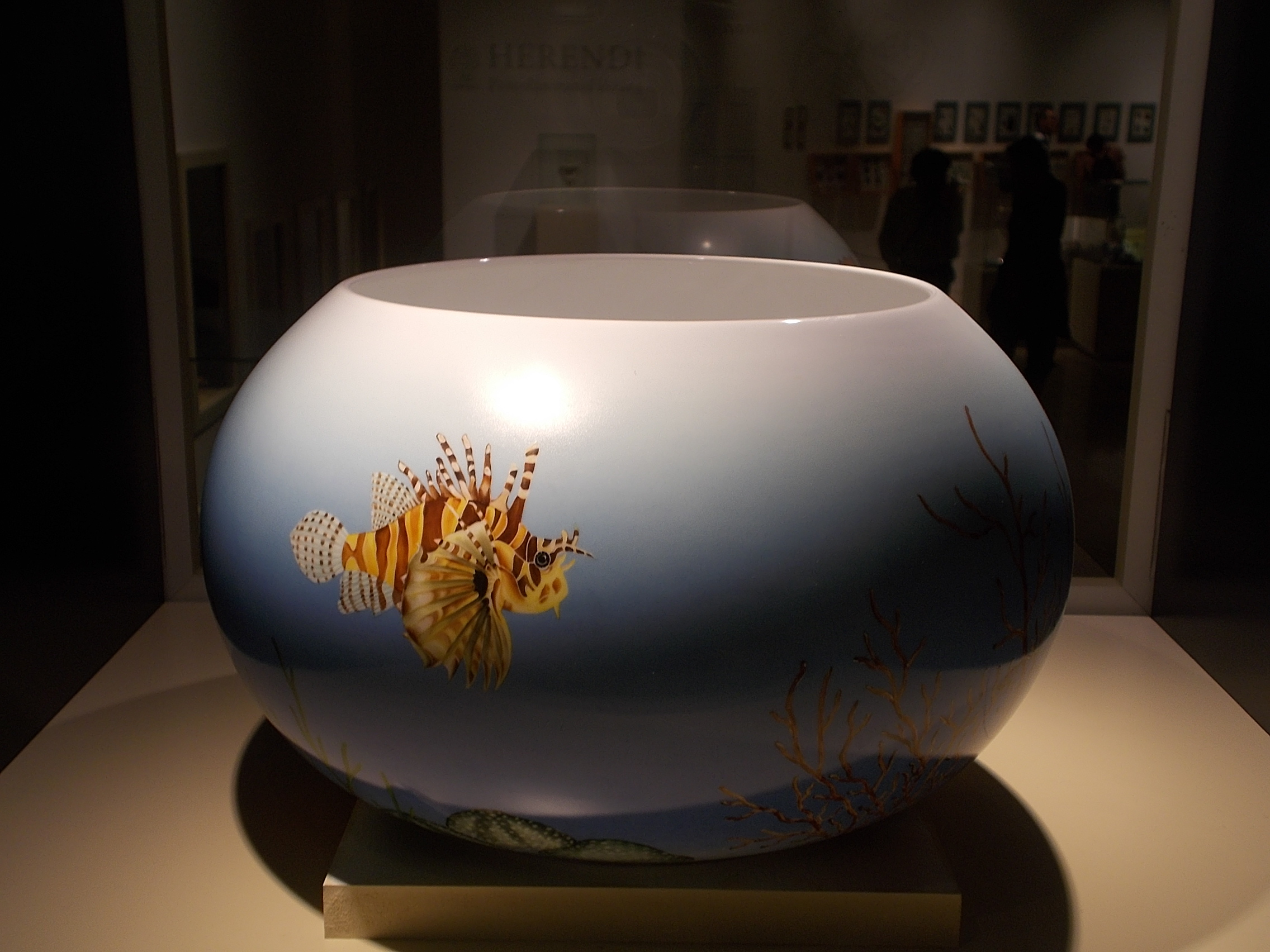
Herend bowl

The Herend Porcelain Manufactory (Hungarian: Herendi Porcelánmanufaktúra Zrt.) is a Hungarian manufacturing company, specializing in luxury hand-painted and gilded porcelain. Founded in 1826, it is based in the town of Herend near the city of Veszprém.

In the mid-19th century, it was purveyor to the Habsburg dynasty and aristocratic customers throughout Europe. Many of its classic patterns are still in production.

After the fall of communism in Hungary, the factory was privatised and is now 75% owned by its management and workers. The factory exports to over 60 countries of the world, with its main markets being Italy, Germany, Russia, Japan and the United States.

== History ==
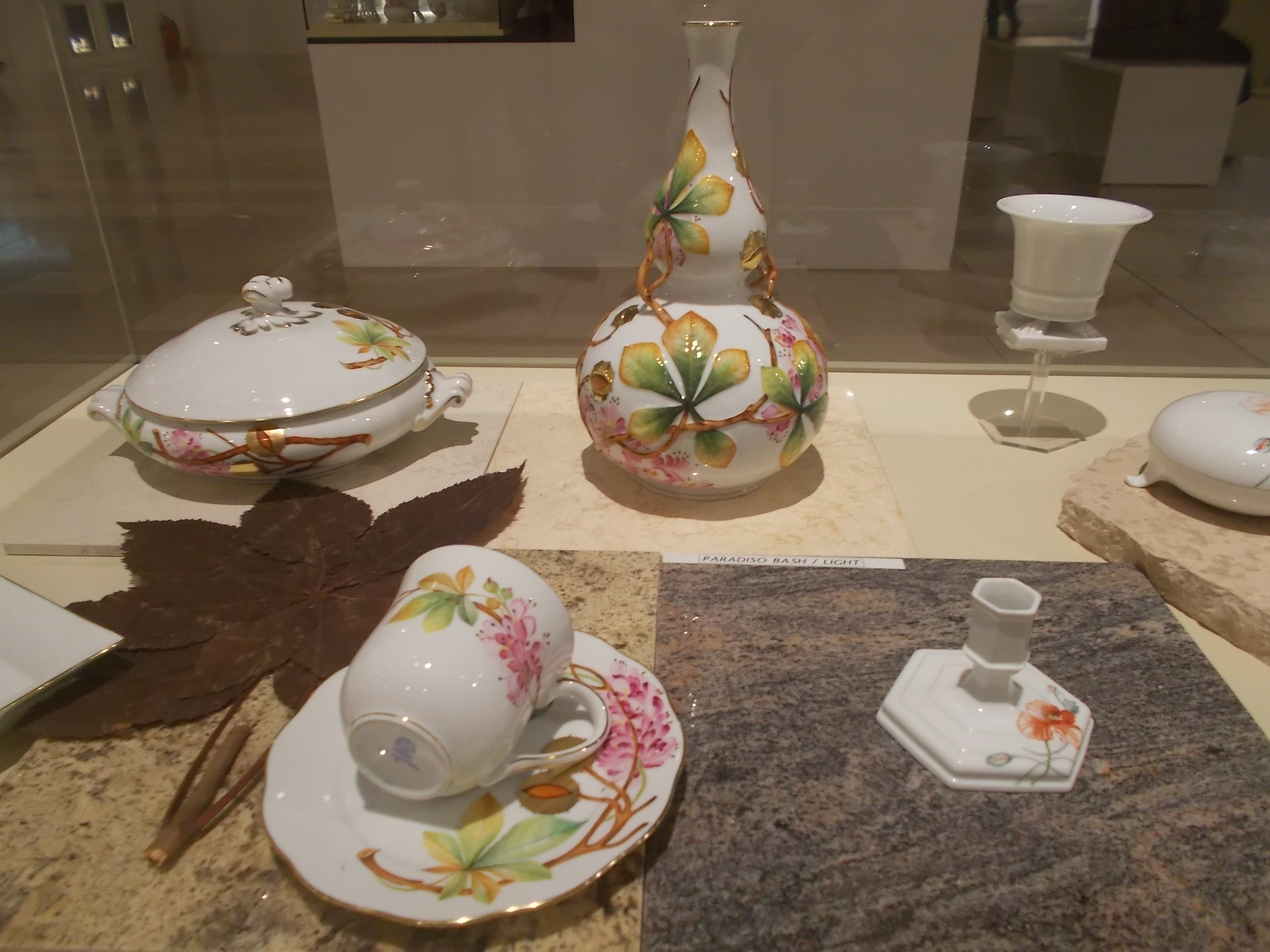
Bonbonniere, candlestick and vase.

The factory at Herend was founded in 1826 by Vince Stingl as an earthenware pottery manufacturing factory; Stingl also carried out research experiments on porcelain making. Stingl ran out of funds and subsequently went bankrupt; his creditor Mór Fischer took control of the factory in 1839. Fischer, an ambitious man with new ideas, started manufacturing artistic porcelain in the same year. At that time it was almost impossible to replace broken pieces and supply old, classical porcelain dinner-sets from the Far East and from Europe; so by 1849 Fischer's was selling his wares to the Hungarian aristocracy.

Lajos Kossuth, the famous Hungarian president once said due to the achieved successes about the Herend Porcelain Manufacture:

"an ornate sign of the joyful development of the home-made industry"

— Lajos Kossuth

Herend displayed its designs at the First Hungarian Applied Art Exhibition; the Vienna Exhibition in 1845; the Great Exhibition in London, 1851; the Exhibition of the Industry of All Nations in New York, 1853; and the Exposition Universelle in Paris, 1855. The styles became popular, and orders were received on behalf of several royal courts: Queen Victoria, Franz Joseph I of Austria and Maximilian I of Mexico.

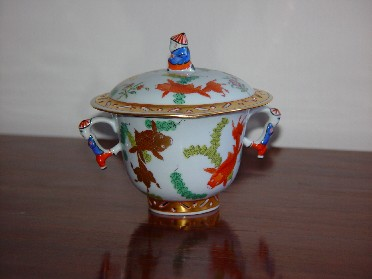
Herend's "Chinese" pattern

Some well-known patterns were named for the first customers: (Queen Victoria, Esterházy, Batthyány, Rothschild, Apponyi). In 1865 Francis Joseph I gave a noble title to Fischer, in appreciation of his work in porcelain art. From 1872 Mór Fischer Farkasházy, Purveyor to the Royal Court, was entitled to use the shapes and patterns of the Manufactory of Vienna, which had closed down.

In 1874 Fischer gave the management of the manufactory to his sons. These men changed the focus of the company away from artistic creation, and sales began to decline. The factory had several owners, and went almost bankrupt. At the end of the century, the grandson of the founder, Jenő Farkasházy, became the owner of the factory. Farkasházy was a trained ceramist, who had gained experience in foreign factories and began to create new designs and revive traditional patterns. He also introduced novelties in 1900 Paris and 1901 Saint Petersburg.

Between the two world wars, limited reproduction of traditional products, from the age of Fischer, was continued. Hungarian figures were also manufactured, replicas of the work of Hungarian sculptors.

In 1948 the company was nationalised. In 1993 it was privatised, and in 2015 75% is owned by the management and workers.

== Products - Prizes - Exhibitions - United Nations Collection ==
Herend products are made from hard-paste porcelain using a mixture of kaolin, feldspar and quartz.

Herend porcelain has won 24 grand and gold prizes in world exhibitions between 1851 and 1937. One of the best known Herend patterns was presented at the London World Exhibition in 1851, the Chinese-style butterflies and flowery branches painted in joyful, lively colours. The British queen, Victoria, ordered a dinner set with its gold medal-winning pattern for Windsor Castle, and so the pattern is named "Viktória".

The Herend Porcelain Manufactory was a supplier to the Habsburg dynasty, and the aristocracy in Hungary and abroad.

The company has occasionally produced the trophies given out to the winners of the Formula One Hungarian Grand Prix. One such trophy, the first-place trophy won by Max Verstappen in 2023, was damaged when Lando Norris (who finished second) accidentally slammed a bottle of Ferrari Trento sparkling wine onto the rostrum during the podium celebration, knocking it off in the process.

A selection of Herend Porcelain is part of the "Artworks on display" at the United Nations Office at Geneva and taken up in the online UNOG Catalogue.

== Critics ==
As of 2022, Herend has continued its operations in Russia, maintaining its business activities without significant changes despite the ongoing war in Ukraine. The company has faced criticism for not making public any changes to its operations in Russia amid international pressure for businesses to cease activities in the country.

== Museum ==
The company operates the Porcelain Museum of Herend at its site. The museum opened to visitors in 1964 and was chosen as the museum of the year 2002 in Hungary. The museum presents the history of and the technology used by the Herend factory, and working displays take visitors through the production proces.
