= Móric Fischer de Farkasházy =

Hungarian noble and businessman (1799–1880)

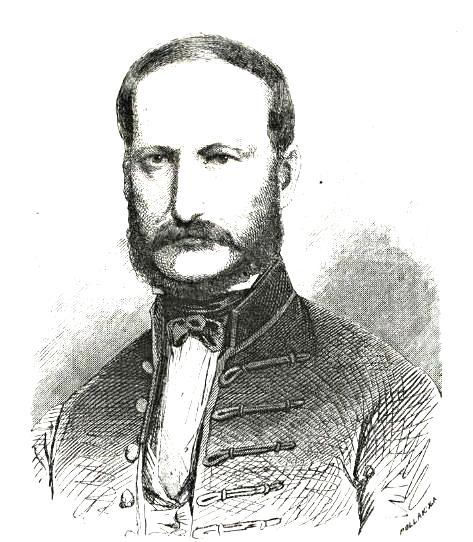
Móric Fischer de Farkasházy

Móric Fischer de Farkasházy (German: Moritz Fischer von Farkasházy, Hungarian: Farkasházy Fischer Mór(ic)) (25 March 1799 – 25 February 1880) was a Hungarian porcelain-manufacturer; was one of the founders of the Herend Porcelain Manufactory in 1839.

He was born in Tata, Hungary to a Jewish family. He rendered distinguished service to Hungarian industry and art through his porcelain manufactory in Herend near Veszprém. He was compelled to struggle against innumerable difficulties before he succeeded in developing the small factory which he founded in 1839. It, however, became a veritable art institute, comparing favorably with the famous porcelain establishments of Sèvres, Meissen, and Berlin. It has been represented at a large number of international expositions by interesting and artistic exhibits, which were invariably awarded first prizes. The establishment is at present (1903) under the direction of Eugen Fischer de Farkasházy, a grandson of the founder. In recognition of the latter's services Franz Joseph I raised him in 1869 to the ranks of the Hungarian nobility. He died in Tata.

His great-great-grandchild, Tivadar Farkasházy is a Hungarian comedian, author, and journalist.
