= Tata, Hungary =

Tata
- Town
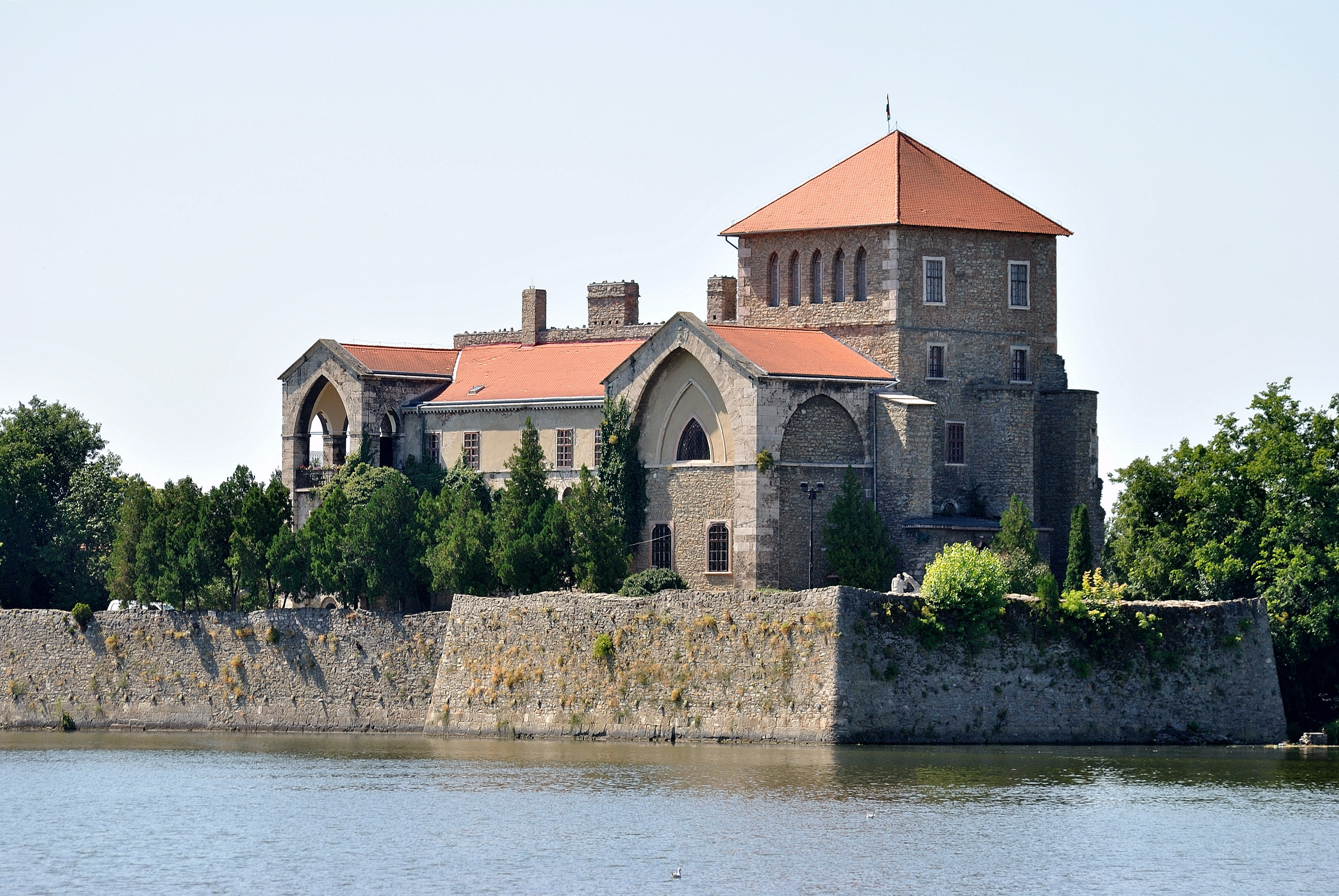
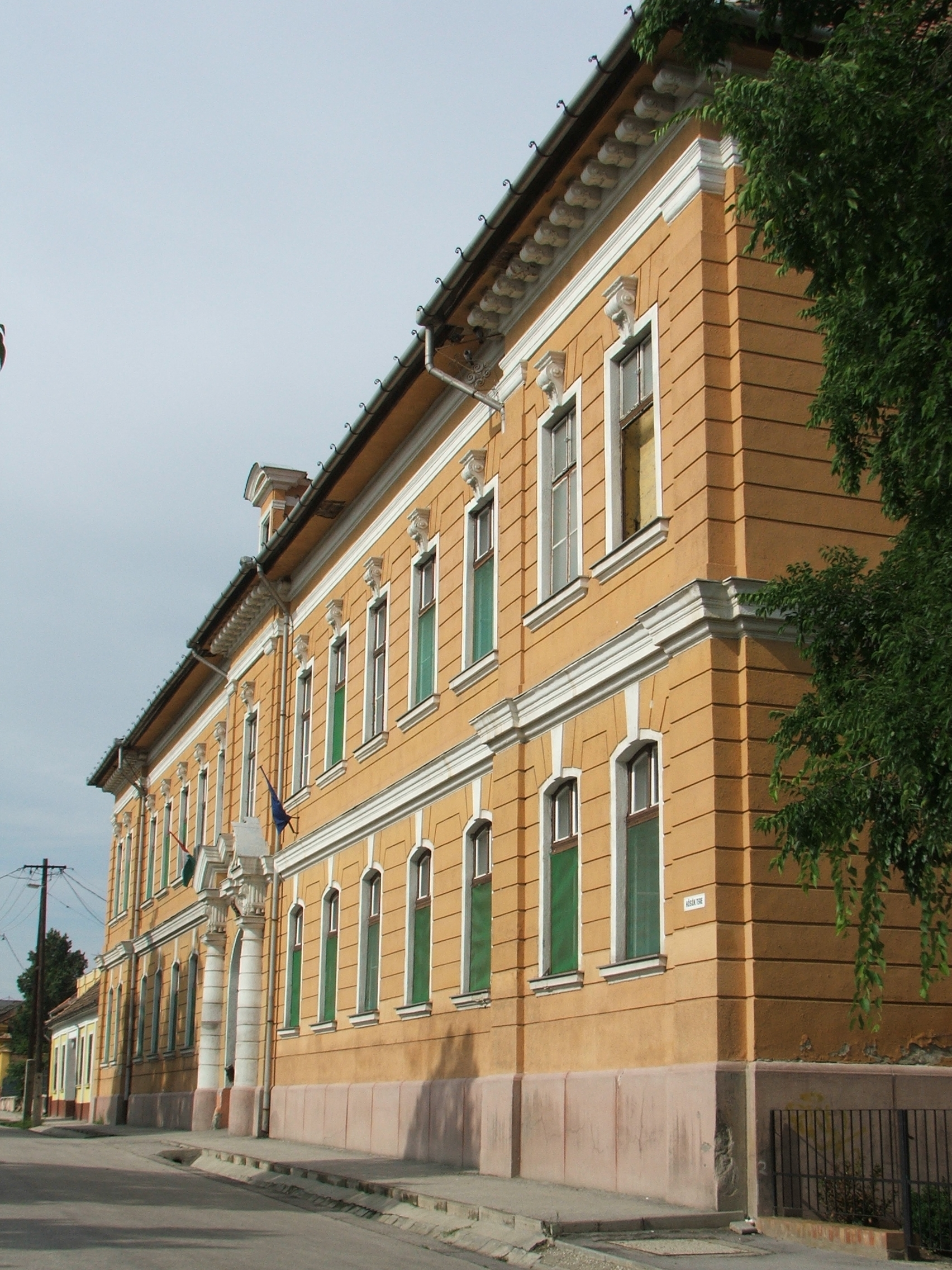
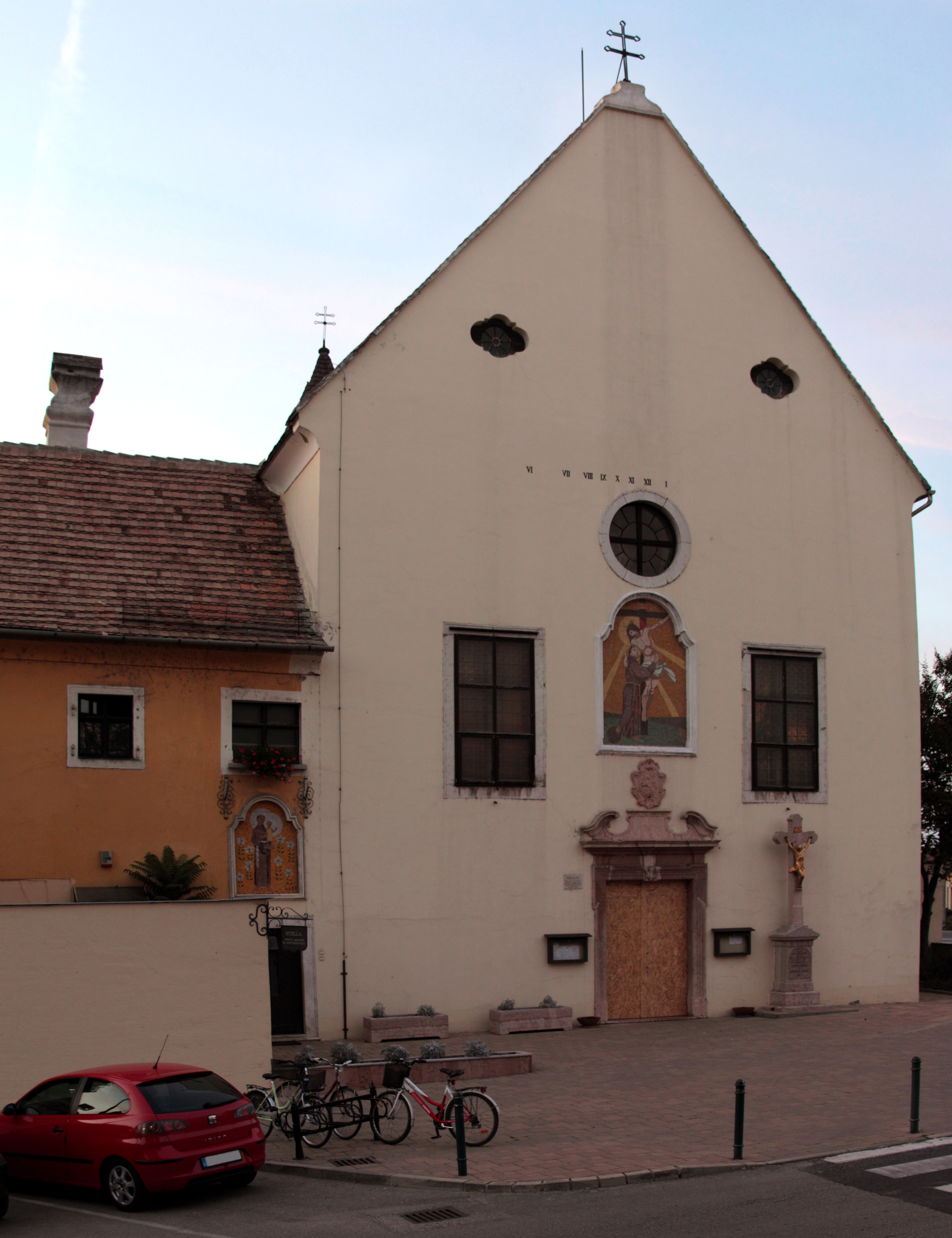
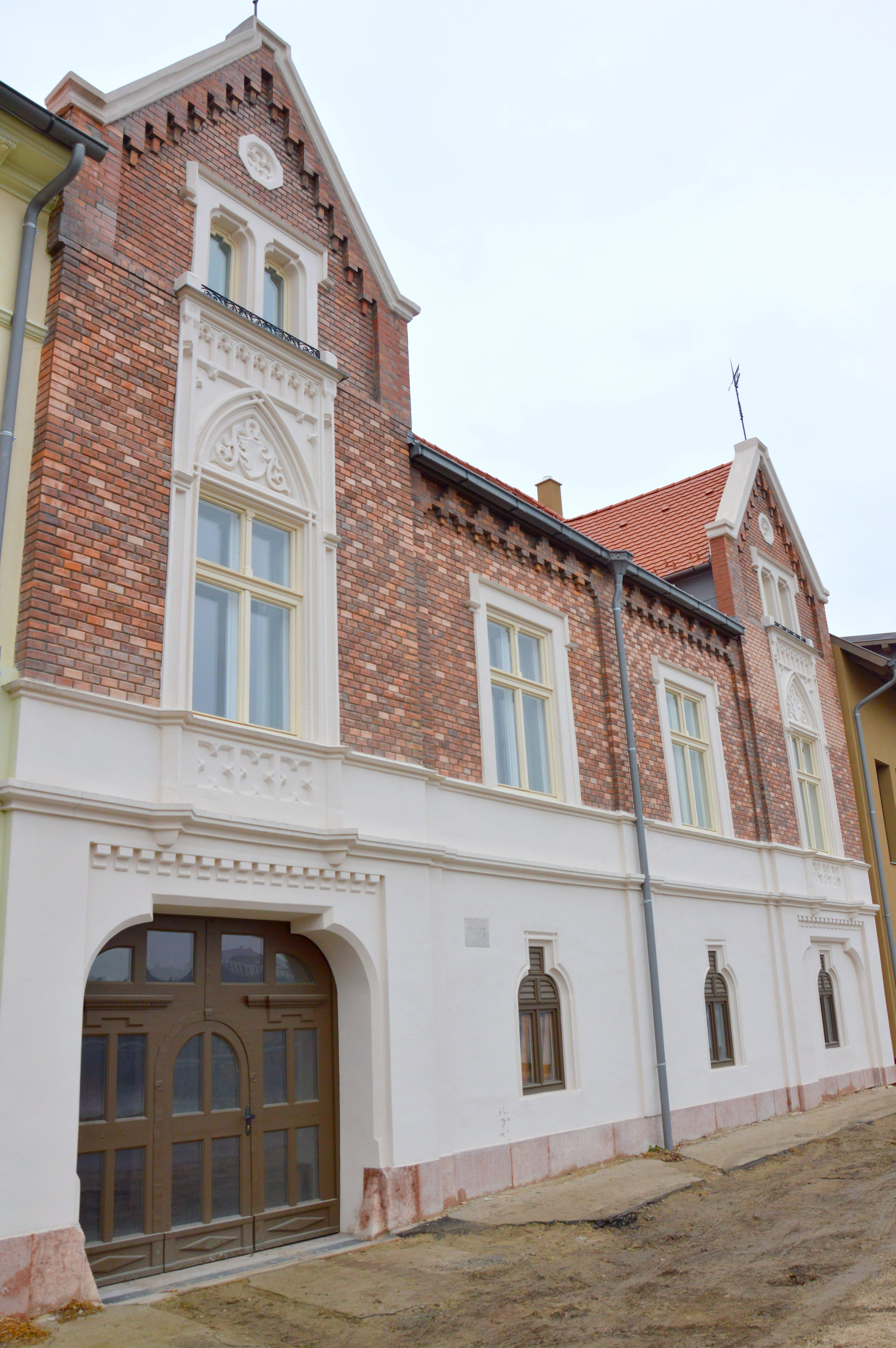
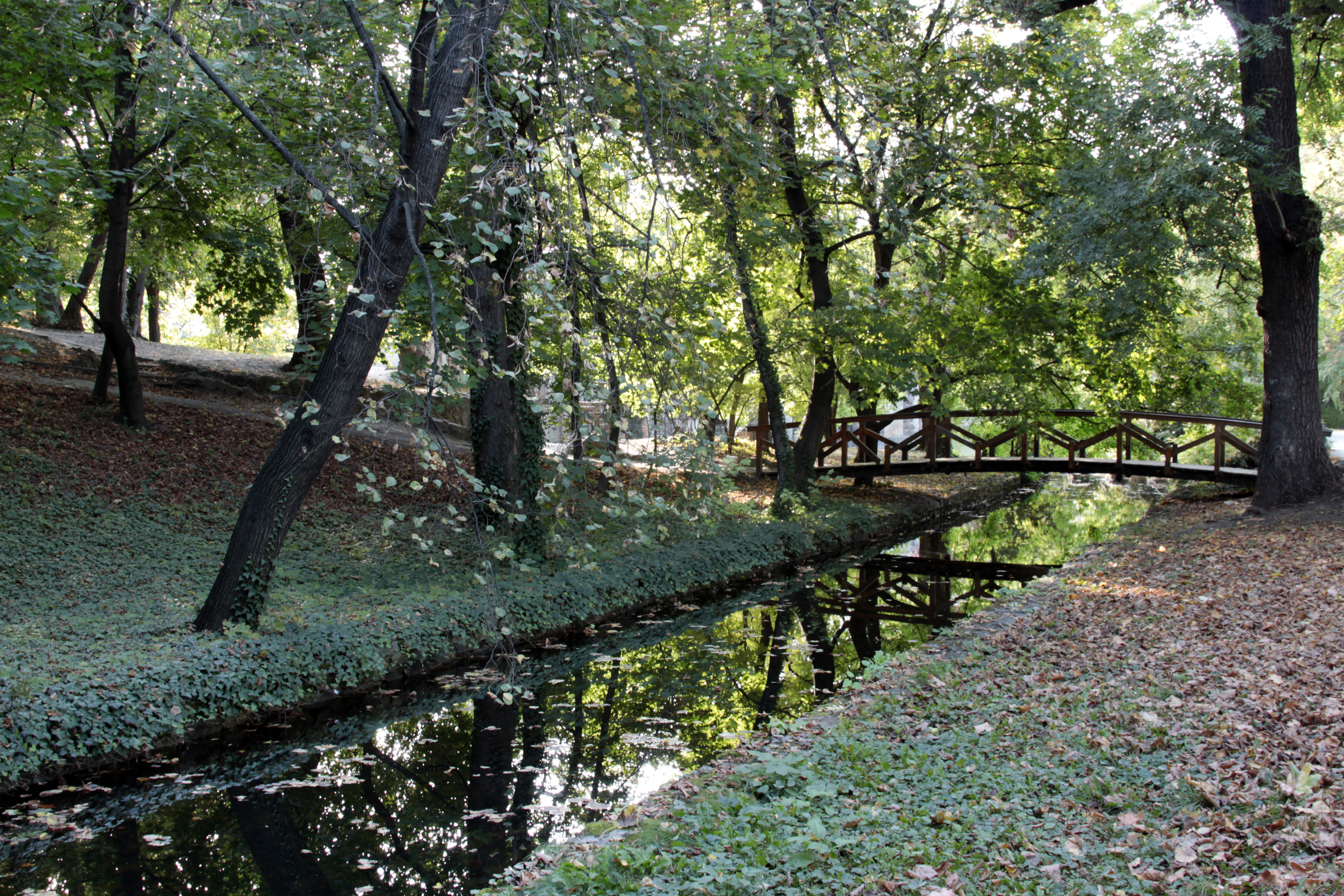
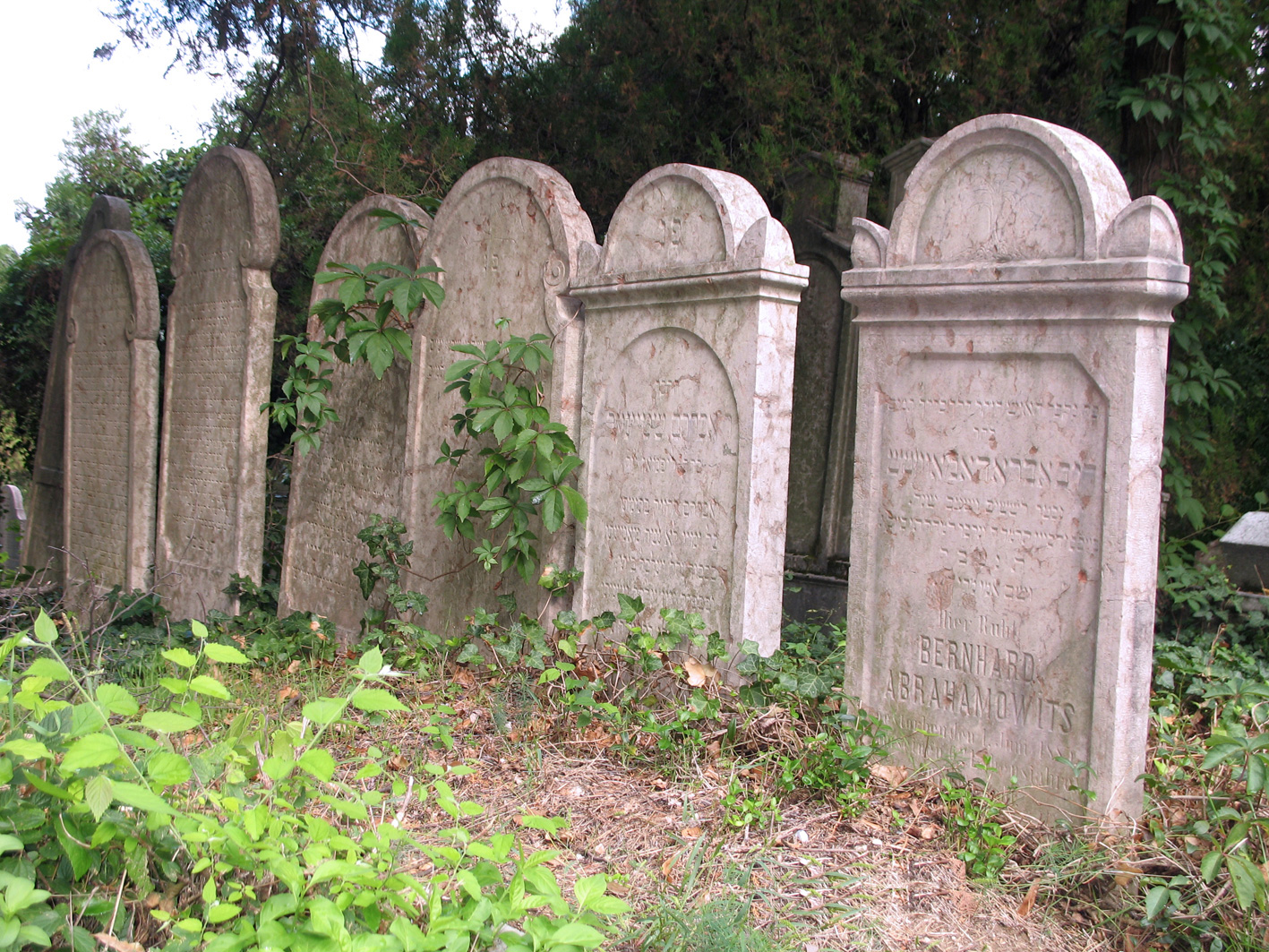

- Flag Coat of arms

- Location of Tata in Hungary
- Coordinates: 47.6526°N 18.3238°E
- Country: Hungary
- Region: Central Transdanubia
- County: Komárom-Esztergom
- District: Tata

Government
  - Mayor: József Michl (Fidesz–KDNP)

Area
  - Total: 78.17 km^{2} (30.18 sq mi)

Population (2023)
  - Total: 23,881
  - Density: 305.5/km^{2} (791.2/sq mi)
  - Demonym: tatai

Population by ethnicity
  - Hungarians: 87.5%
  - Germans: 2.0%
  - Romanis: 0.7%
  - Slovaks: 0.3%
  - Romanians: 0.1%
  - Greeks: 0.1%

Population by religion
  - Roman Catholic: 31.5%
  - Greek Catholic: 0.4%
  - Calvinists: 13.7%
  - Lutherans: 1.4%
  - Jews: 0.1%
  - Other: 1.1%
  - Non-religious: 21.0%
  - Unknown: 30.7%
- Time zone: UTC+1 (CET)
  - Summer (DST): UTC+2 (CEST)
- Postal code: 2890
- Area code: (+36) 34
- Motorways: M1
- Distance from Budapest: 68.2 km (42.4 mi) East
- Website: tata.hu

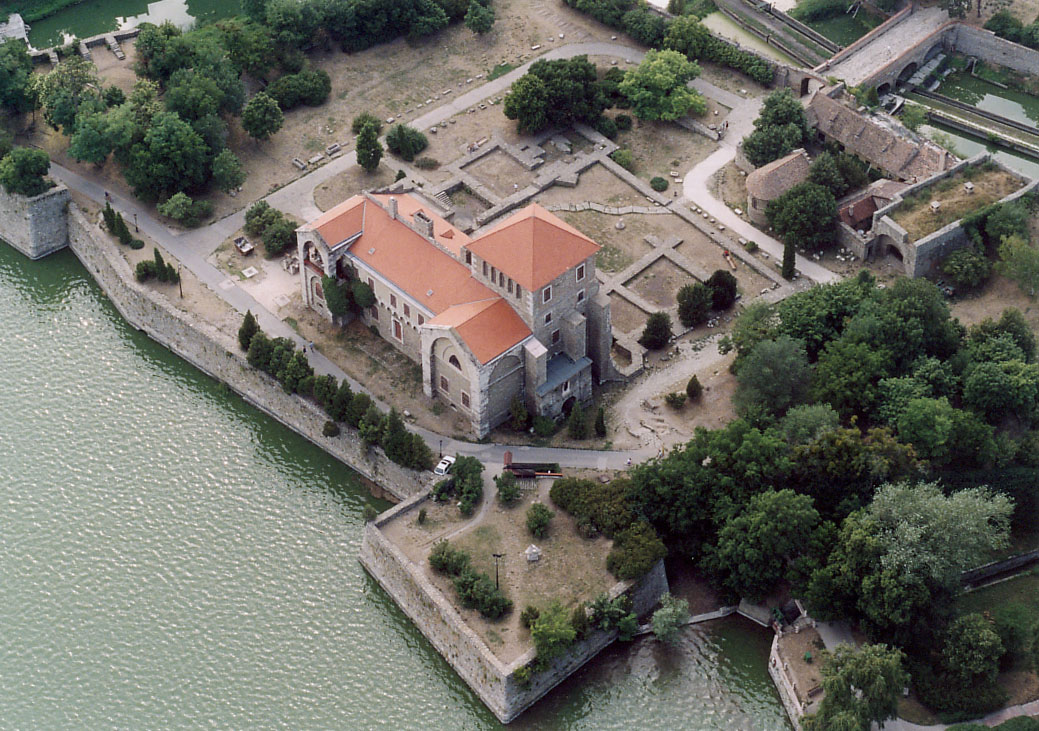
Aerial photography of the fortress

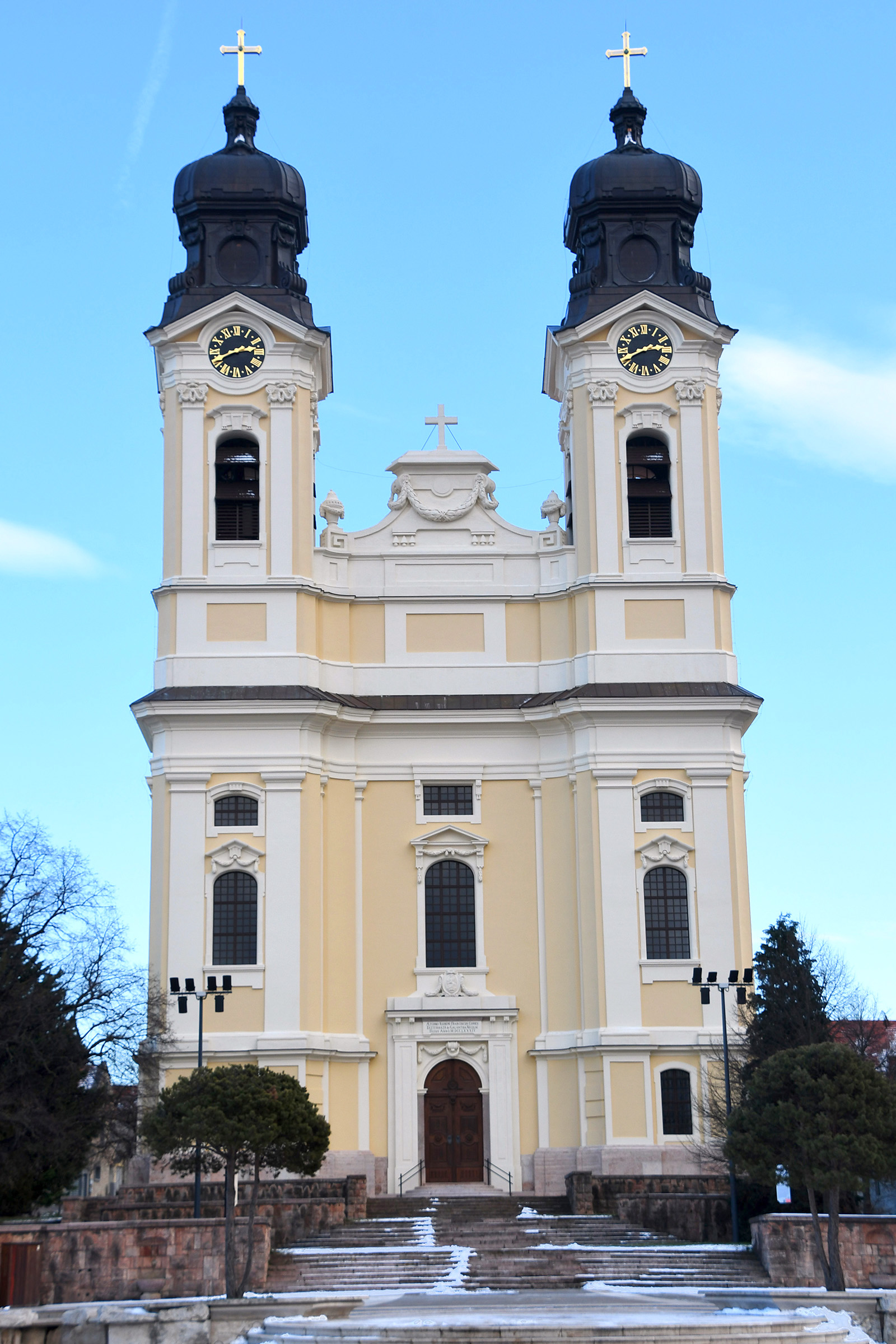
Catholic church at the Kossuth Square, Tata

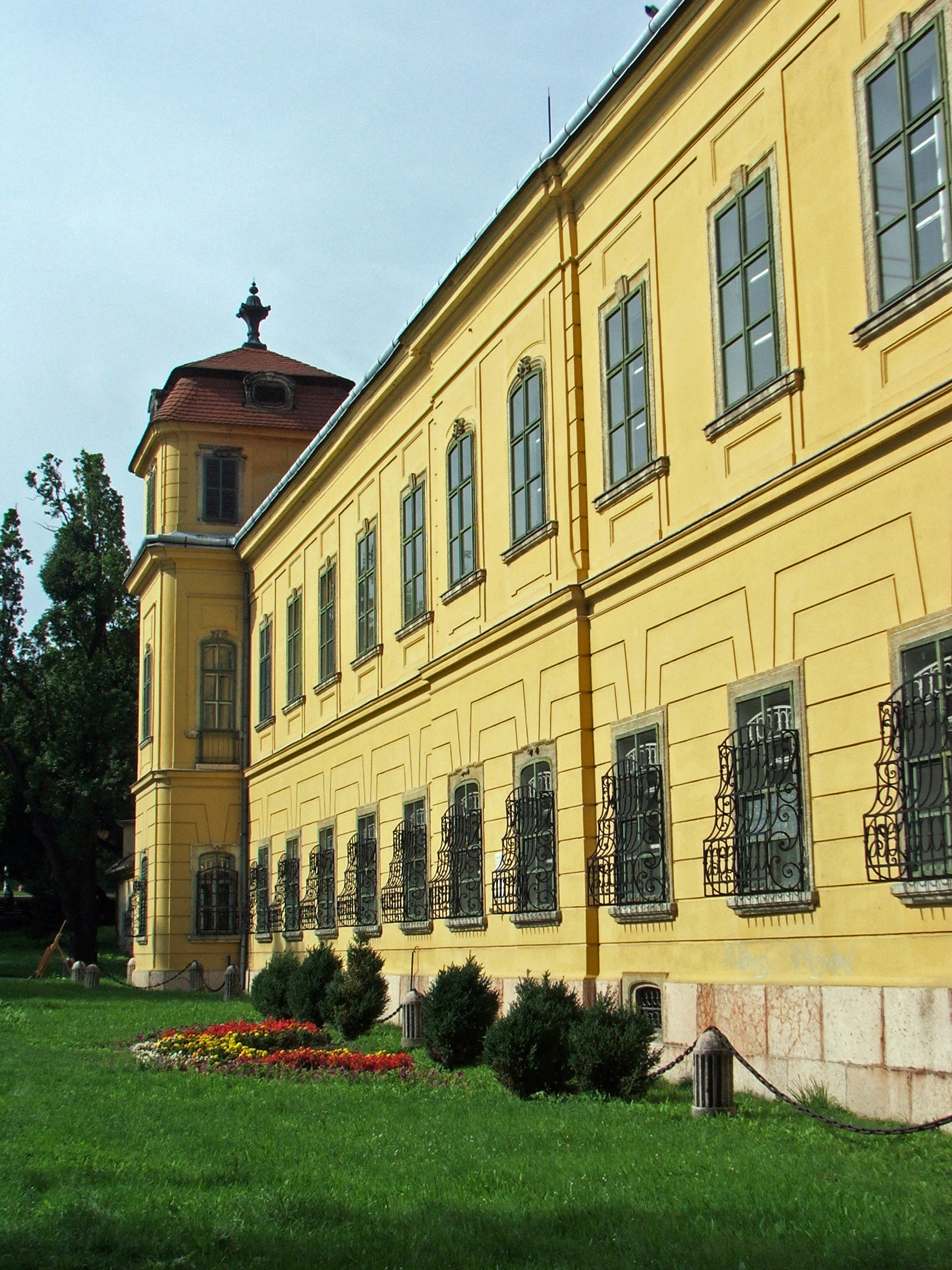
Esterházy palace

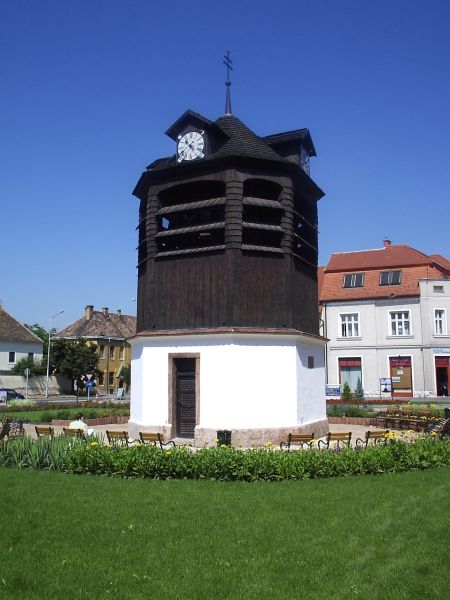
Belfry of Tata

Tata (German: Totis; Latin: Dotis) is a town in Komárom-Esztergom County, northwestern Hungary, 9 km (6 mi) northwest of the county town Tatabánya.

== Geography ==
=== Location ===
Tata is located in the valley between the Gerecse Mountains and Vértes Mountains, some 70 km (43 mi) from Budapest, the Hungarian capital city. By virtue of its location, it is a railway and road junction. Motorway M1 (E60, E75) from Vienna to Budapest passes through the outer city limits, and the railway line Budapest–Vienna goes through the city.

=== Climate ===
Tata's climate is classified as oceanic climate (Köppen Cfb). The annual average temperature is 10.9 °C (51.6 °F), the hottest month in July is 21.4 °C (70.5 °F), and the coldest month is 0.0 °C (32.0 °F) in January. The annual precipitation is 589.4 millimetres (23.20 in), of which July is the wettest with 69.6 millimetres (2.74 in), while February is the driest with only 30.6 millimetres (1.20 in). The extreme temperature throughout the year ranged from −22.7 °C (−8.9 °F) on December 28, 1996 to 39.1 °C (102.4 °F) on August 8, 2013.

Climate data for Tata, 1991−2020 normals
Month	Jan	Feb	Mar	Apr	May	Jun	Jul	Aug	Sep	Oct	Nov	Dec	Year
Record high °C (°F)	17.2 (63.0)	19.9 (67.8)	23.3 (73.9)	31.0 (87.8)	33.1 (91.6)	36.1 (97.0)	38.6 (101.5)	39.1 (102.4)	34.2 (93.6)	27.7 (81.9)	22.4 (72.3)	18.1 (64.6)	39.1 (102.4)
Mean daily maximum °C (°F)	3.1 (37.6)	6.0 (42.8)	11.4 (52.5)	17.9 (64.2)	22.2 (72.0)	25.9 (78.6)	27.7 (81.9)	27.4 (81.3)	22.2 (72.0)	16.1 (61.0)	9.7 (49.5)	3.9 (39.0)	16.1 (61.0)
Daily mean °C (°F)	0.0 (32.0)	1.7 (35.1)	6.0 (42.8)	11.6 (52.9)	16.2 (61.2)	19.7 (67.5)	21.4 (70.5)	20.9 (69.6)	15.8 (60.4)	10.8 (51.4)	5.9 (42.6)	1.0 (33.8)	10.9 (51.6)
Mean daily minimum °C (°F)	−3.2 (26.2)	−2.1 (28.2)	1.1 (34.0)	5.5 (41.9)	9.9 (49.8)	13.4 (56.1)	14.7 (58.5)	14.4 (57.9)	10.3 (50.5)	6.1 (43.0)	2.5 (36.5)	−1.9 (28.6)	5.9 (42.6)
Record low °C (°F)	−21.4 (−6.5)	−19.7 (−3.5)	−16.1 (3.0)	−6.9 (19.6)	−0.7 (30.7)	2.8 (37.0)	5.8 (42.4)	4.0 (39.2)	0.3 (32.5)	−8.9 (16.0)	−12.4 (9.7)	−22.7 (−8.9)	−22.7 (−8.9)
Average precipitation mm (inches)	35.8 (1.41)	30.6 (1.20)	35.4 (1.39)	36.7 (1.44)	67.8 (2.67)	62.5 (2.46)	69.6 (2.74)	62.4 (2.46)	54.7 (2.15)	46.5 (1.83)	47.0 (1.85)	40.4 (1.59)	589.4 (23.20)
Average precipitation days (≥ 1.0 mm)	7.4	6.2	6.8	5.8	8.8	7.1	7.3	6.7	6.4	6.4	7.9	7.4	84.2
Average relative humidity (%)	82.8	76.8	71.0	65.9	70.3	69.1	69.2	72.0	76.0	79.9	82.1	84.2	74.9
Source: NOAA

== Demographics ==
According to the 2001 census, the town has 23,937 inhabitants: 93.3% Hungarians, 1.6% Germans, 0.6% Roma, 0.2% Slovaks and 6.5% other.

== History ==
The area has been inhabited since prehistoric times; archaeological findings date back to 50,000 BCE. Later it was a Roman settlement.

The first known mention of Tata is from 1221. Its name may come from the name of Lombard king Tato. Its castle was built by the Lackfi family and had its prime under Matthias Corvinus, who had it rebuilt in a Renaissance style.

In 1526 when the disastrous battle with the Turks happened and Louis II died in the battlefield, Count György Cseszneky was the castellan of the Castle Tata. The plundering Ottoman army ransacked the area, but Cseszneky successfully defended the castle.

During the Ottoman occupation, the castle of Tata was an important fortress. It was captured in 1543 by the Turks. During this period the castle had many different owners until it was burned down by the Habsburgs in retaliation for the Rákóczi's War of Independence.

In 1727, Count József Esterházy bought Tata and the surrounding villages. The town prospered, in 1765 it already had a secondary school.

According to the article in the Pallas Lexicon about Tata in 1851, the town was a "pretty and developing village in the Tata district of Komárom comitatus; 895 buildings, 6925 mostly Hungarian residents (3633 Roman Catholics, 2518 Lutherans and 673 Israelites), centre of the district, with secondary school, railway station, post office. Tata and the adjoining village Tóváros (4257 residents) are built around a large lake, Tata on the hillside, and Tóváros on the plain. Between them, there are the Esterházy mansion and an old castle with an archive and a gallery which included a painting of Leonardo da Vinci. The theatre was built in 1889. The mansion is surrounded by the English garden (140 hectares)."

In 1938, the village of Tóváros was annexed to Tata. So thus, the city was renamed Tatatóváros but only for a short while; one year later, it was named Tata again.

During World War II, Tata was captured by Soviet troops of the 2nd Ukrainian Front on 19 March 1945 during the course of the Vienna Offensive.

Tata was granted town status in 1954.

== Main sights ==
- Castle next to the Öreg-tó (Old Lake)
- The Esterházy Palace
- Heroes' Square with World War I monument and synagogue
- Kossuth Square with town hall
- The parish church of Tata
- The Capuchin church
- Calvary Hill
- Lookout tower
- Water mills
- Belfry
- The English Park
- False ruins
- Fényes Bath
- Turkish Mescid

== Notable people ==
- Móric Fischer de Farkasházy (1799–1880), porcelain-manufacturer, one of the founders of the Herend Porcelain manufactory in 1839
- Csilla Földi (born 1968), retired weightlifter
- Lívia Járóka (born 1974), politician (Fidesz), first Romani woman to be elected to the European Parliament
- Dávid Korányi, political adviser
- Dóra Lőwy (born 1977), former team handball player and Olympic medalist
- Joci Pápai (born 1981), singer, representative for Hungary at Eurovision in 2017 and 2019
- Zsófia Tóth (born 1989), triathlete
- Slavko Wolf (1862–1936), Croatian lawyer, chess player and writer.
- Zoltan Bathory (Born 1978), founder and rhythm guitarist of Five Finger Death Punch.
- Ottó Bláthy (1860–1939), electrical engineer who co-invented the transformer

== Twin towns – sister cities ==
Tata is twinned with:

- Alkmaar, Netherlands (1985)
- Gerlingen, Germany (1987)
- Dammarie-lès-Lys, France (1993)
- Arenzano, Italy (1994)
- Svodín, Slovakia (1997)
- Montebelluna, Italy (2000)
- Sovata, Romania (2002)
- Pińczów, Poland (2004)
- Bystřice, Czech Republic
- Kanjiža, Serbia

== Notes ==
- Neal Bedford and Lisa Dunford. Lonely Planet, 2009, p. 159-162.
