= Red Bridge (Bratislava) =

Bridge in Bratislava, Slovakia

Red Bridge Červený most
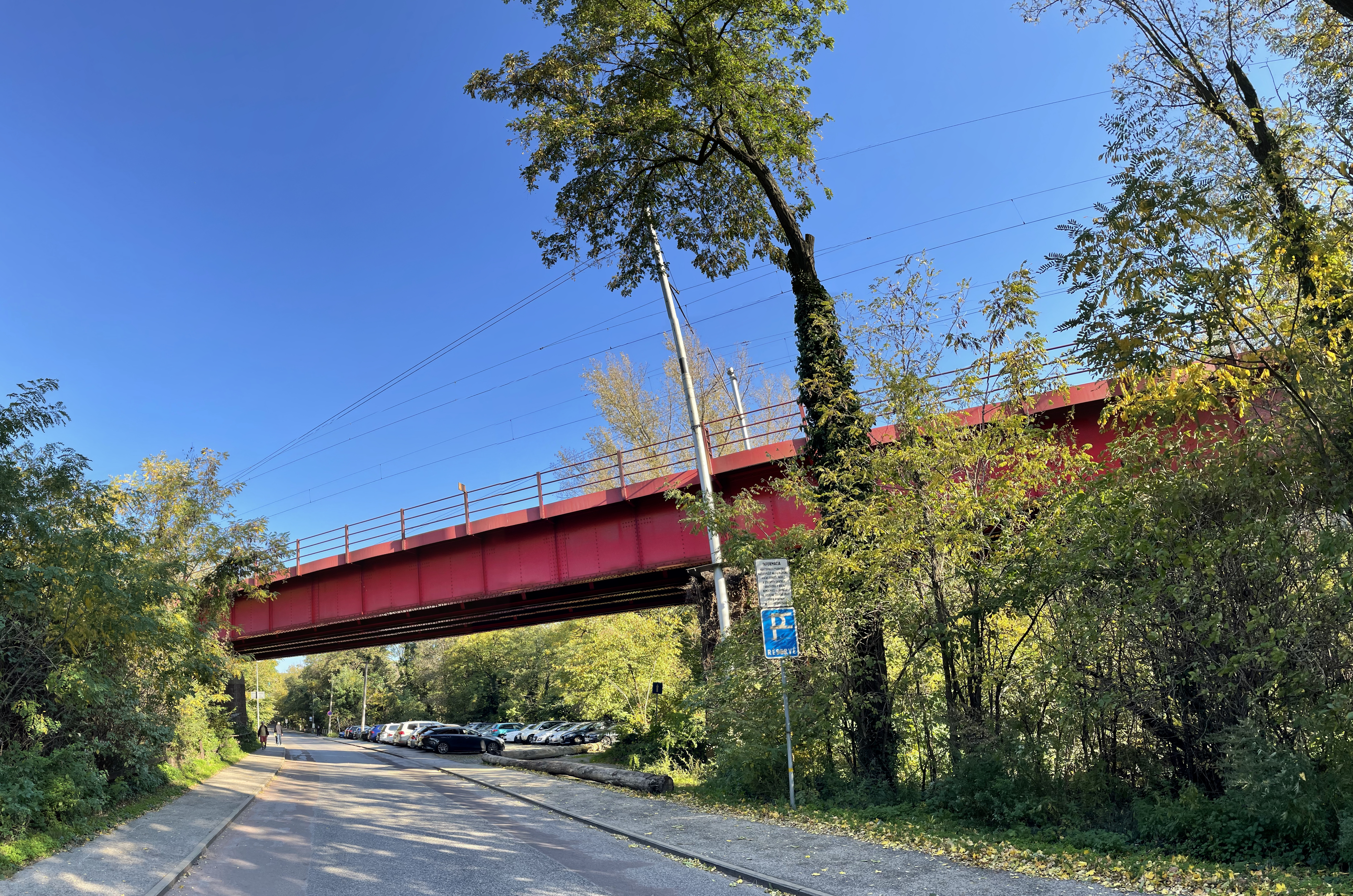
- The Red Bridge in 2022
- Coordinates: 48.17398°N 17.074°E
- Locale: Bratislava, Slovakia
- Other name: Red Railroad
- Maintained by: Škoda Holding

Characteristics
- Material: Steel

History
- Built: 1946–1948
- Opened: 30 April 1948

Location
- Interactive map of Red Bridge

Red Bridge (Slovak: Červený most) is a railway bridge in Bratislava, Slovakia, spanning the Mlynská Valley. It is recognizable by its distinctive red paint and was built in 1848 as part of the Gänserndorf–Marchegg–Bratislava railway line and was originally single-track and built of red bricks. It was rebuilt to its current state in 1948. The bridge spans the city road, a pedestrian and cyclist path, and the Vydrica stream with its adjacent stream valley.

== History ==
It is the largest railway bridge on the oldest steam-powered railway in Slovakia. It was built between the years 1845–1848 as a single-track railway bridge. It was part of the construction of the Hungarian Central Railway from Gänserndorf via Marchegg to Bratislava. The main engineer of the bridge was Jozef Bayer. It consisted of nine semicircular brick arches of a distinctive red color (hence the origin of the name "Red Bridge"). The first arch (from the Lamač side) had a span of 10.7 m and bridged the road leading to Železná studnička. The remaining eight arches (with a span of 15.85 m) spanned the valley. The 215 m long and 17 m high, originally brick bridge was double-tracked in 1881. Another extensive reconstruction of the bridge took place under the supervision of the Czech Railways in 1935 and consisted of the rehabilitation of the masonry and the reinforcement of the arches with a reinforced concrete shell. The retreating German army blew up the bridge on April 4, 1945. Only the torso of the bridge's outermost support on the side closer to Bratislava had survived from the bridge.

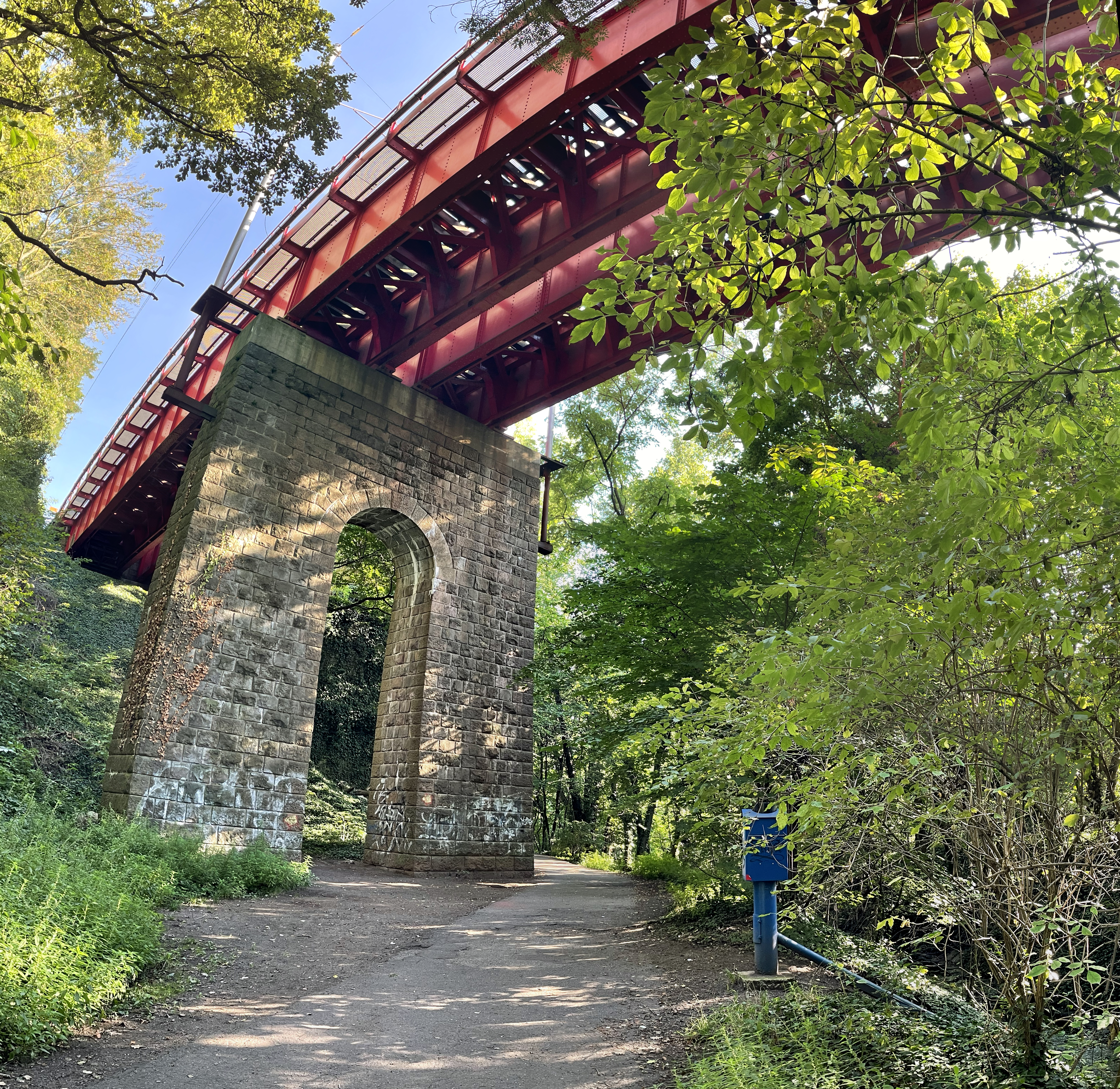
View from underneath the bridge

Immediately after the war, the inhabitants of Bratislava (with the help of the Red Army) built a temporary single-track wooden bridge on the site in seven days. The steel bridge structure was manufactured and assembled on site by the Škoda Works bridge workshop in Plzeň. It weighed 1,122 tons. Reflecting its original name, the newly completed bridge was painted red. Near the Red Bridge is the Bratislava-Železná studienka railway stop, which is part of the Bratislava - Marchegg railway line, along which the first train from Vienna, pulled by a steam locomotive, arrived in Bratislava on August 20, 1848. The line enabled Bratislava to be connected to the developing railway system in Europe. Since April 29, 1986 it has been included in the list of protected technical monuments.

== See also ==
- List of bridges in Bratislava city
