= List of bridges in Bratislava city =

There are currently six bridges over the Danube river in Bratislava, the capital of Slovakia. While all of them support a mix of pedestrian, bicycle, tram, rail and car traffic, one of them stands out as designed for pedestrians, cyclists and trams, without car traffic.

== Lanfranconi Bridge ==
Lanfranconi is the first bridge in Bratislava made of concrete. It is also a part of the D2 highway. It was built within 1985–1991. The highest average number of cars crossing the bridge daily was measured to be around 75000 in 2020, peaking at around 106 000. The priority of the design was aimed to be clean, not interruptive to the surrounding nature by its shape, not blocking any view of the city by its body structure, while being in harmony with the already existing bridge at that time – SNP Bridge.

The Lanfranconi Bridge is 761 metres long. There is a four-lane roadway, together 30 metres wide.

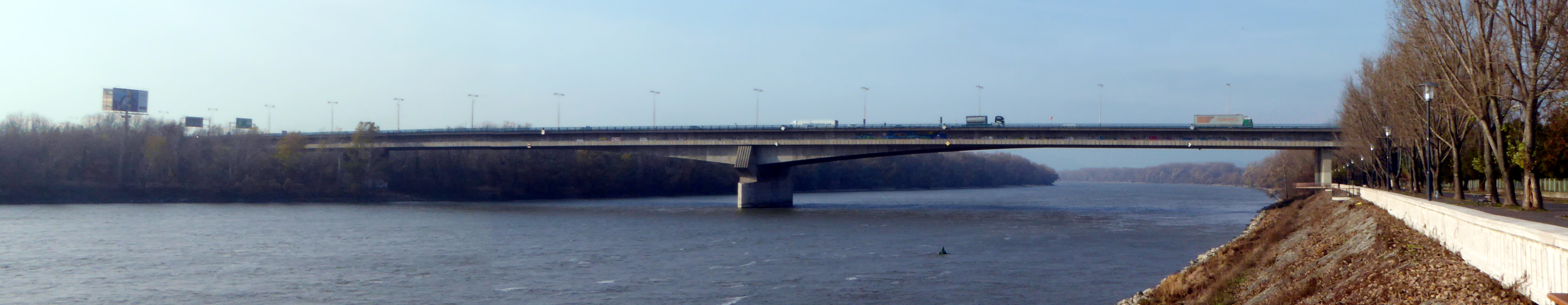
Lanfranconi Bridge

Underneath the roadway, there are also footbridges for pedestrians and bikers on both sides. Inside the bridge, there is a waterpipe and a gas pipeline going through.

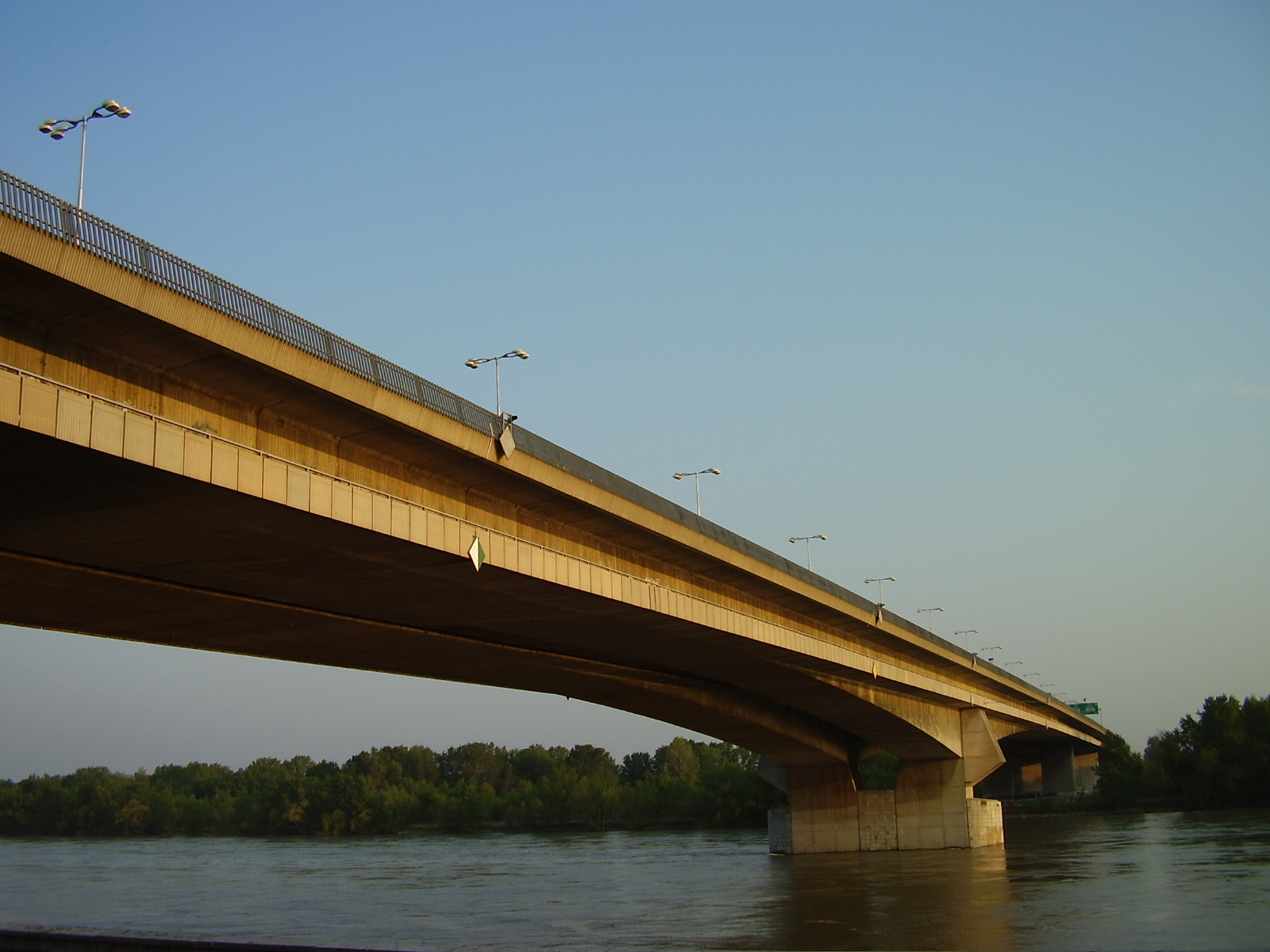
Lanfranconi

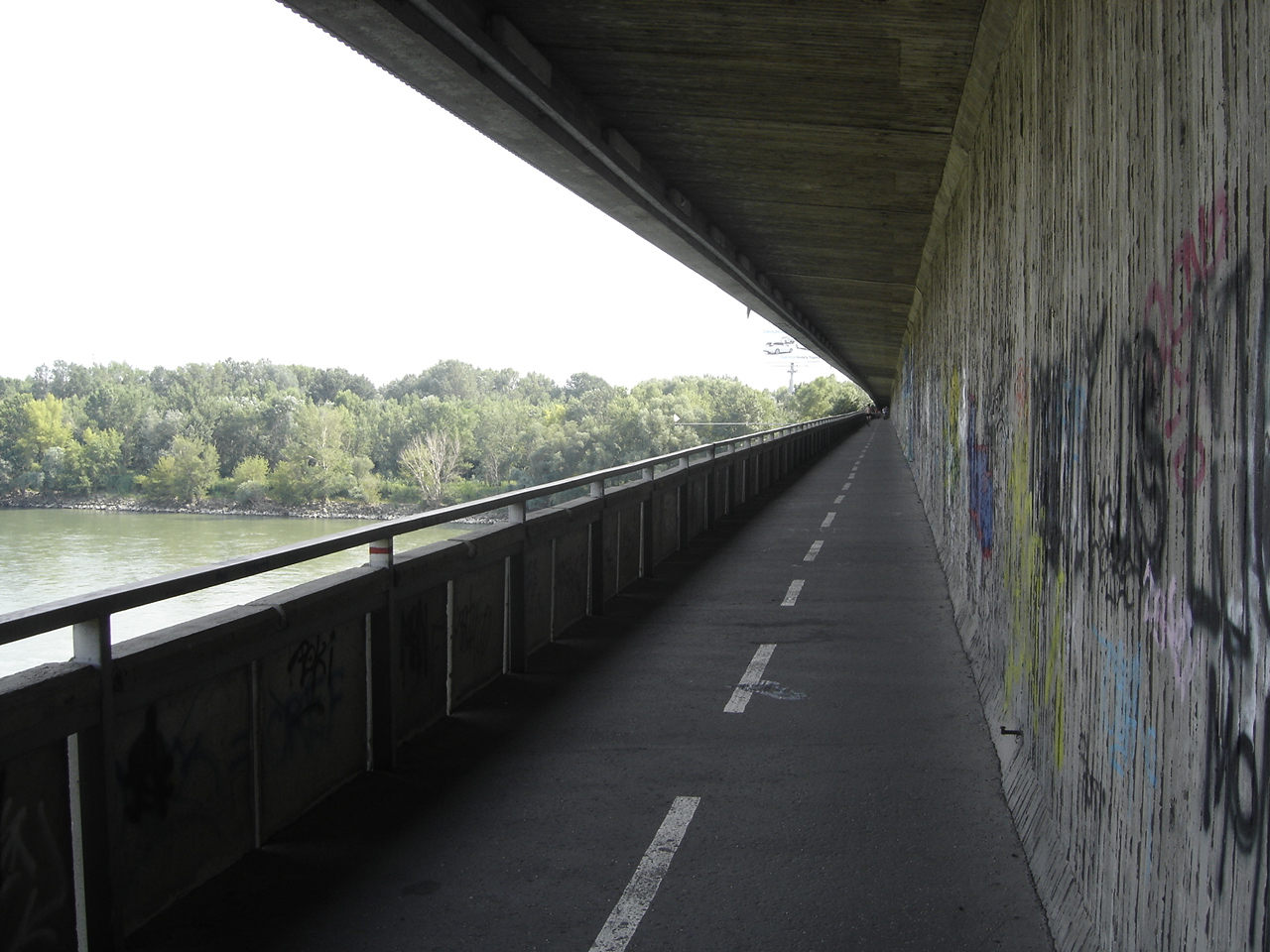
Lanfranconi

Lafranconi
pedestrians	yes
cars	yes
buses	yes
bikes	yes
trams	no
trains	no
gas or water pipelines	yes

=== The name of the bridge ===
The original name was supposed to be Most mládeže - Bridge of Youth, however, it finally got named Lanfranconi after Count Enea Grazioso Lanfranconi, a famous, originally Italian, builder in Bratislava who owned a mansion situated nearby the bridge today hosting Comenius University premises.

== SNP Bridge ==
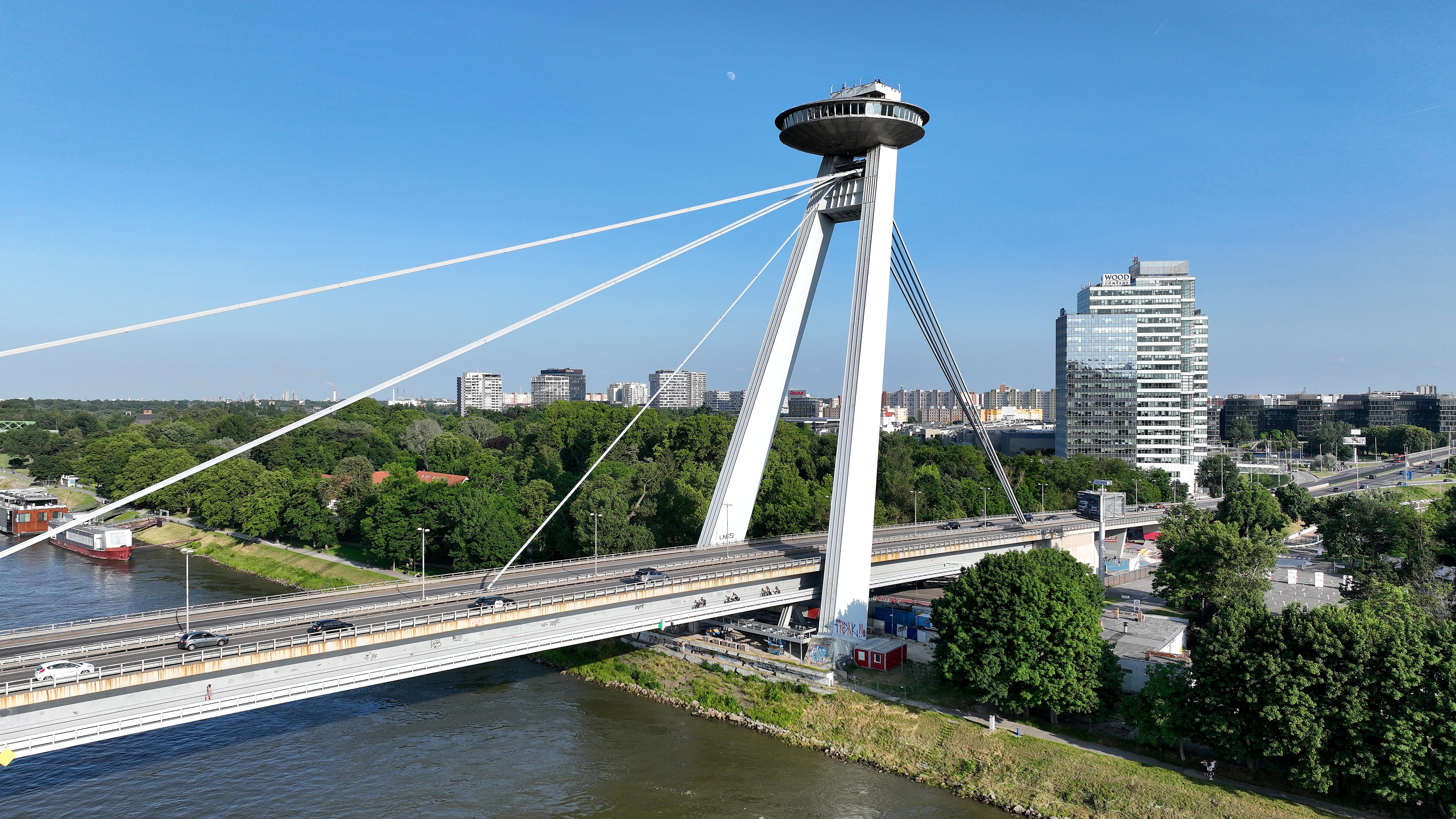
Northwest view of the Slovak National Uprising Bridge

From 1993 to 2012 the bridge was named Nový Most - New Bridge. It is made of steel, a fan-shaped design suspended bridge. It is the only bridge in Bratislava to have no single pillar inside the Danube River. It is the biggest bridge in Bratislava. In 2002 it was named a Century Building in Slovakia in the category Bridge Constructions. The SNP Bridge belongs to the association World Federation of Great Towers. Since May 2018 it is also a National Culture Heritage site.

The bridge was built within 1967–1972.

For the sake of building this bridge, a few historic sites were destroyed – a part of the Bratislava Castle structures, historically important parts of Vydrica, Rybné Námestie - Fish Square and Bratislava's Neolog Moorish synagogue. This bridge, however, helped to speed up the traffic and also helped the development of Petržalka District.

The length of this bridge is 430.8 metres. The height is 95 metres. The diameter of the dome is 32 metres.

The bridge has two of the two-lane roadways, and has pedestrians and cyclist sections underneath on both sides.

In the category of suspended bridges, it gained fourth place in 1972. However, it is on top of the world's bridges with only one single pylon and only one single hanging plane. Inside the bridge there is a waterpipe, the supplying Old Town and Petržalka districts.

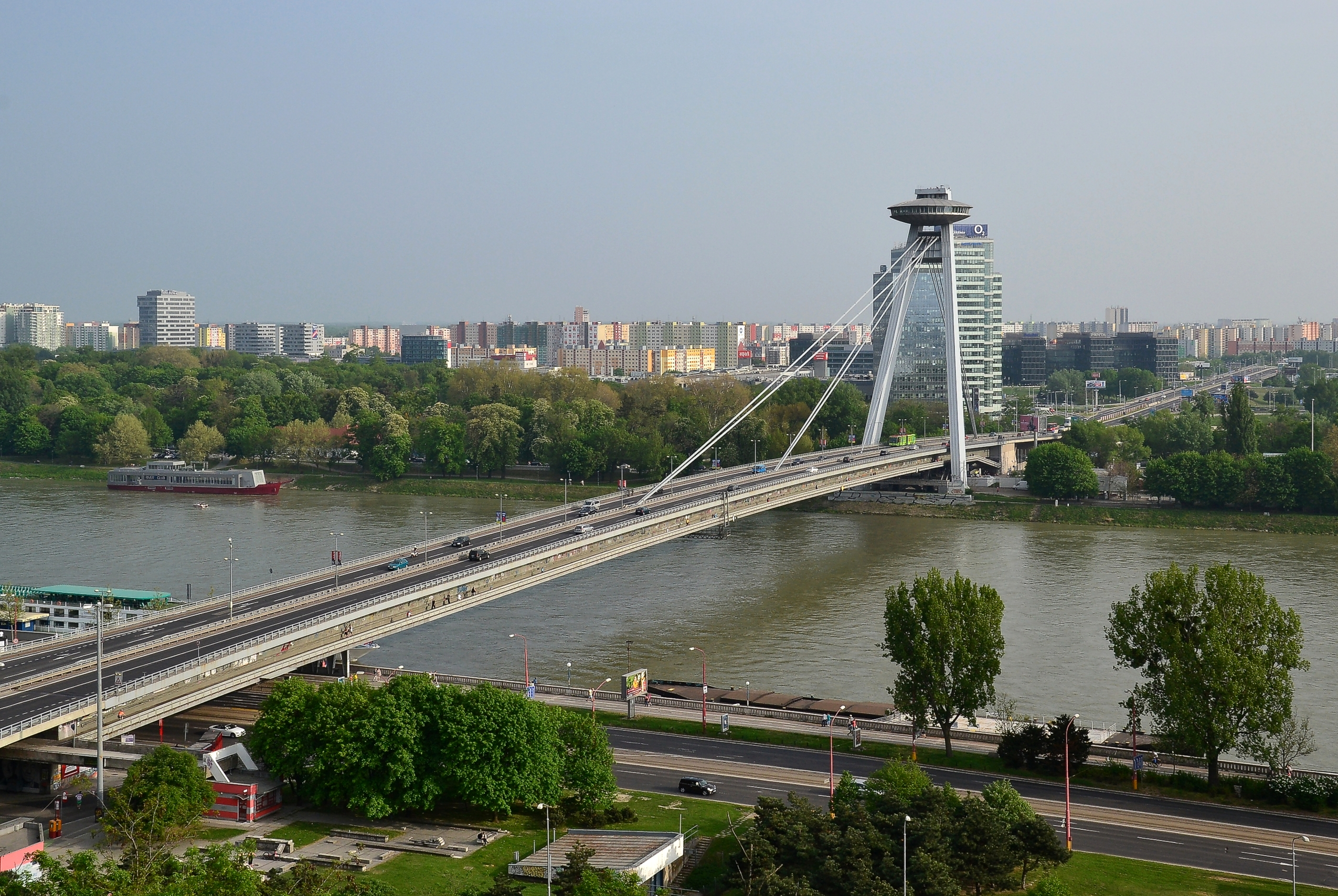
Most SNP, Bratislava (by Pudelek)

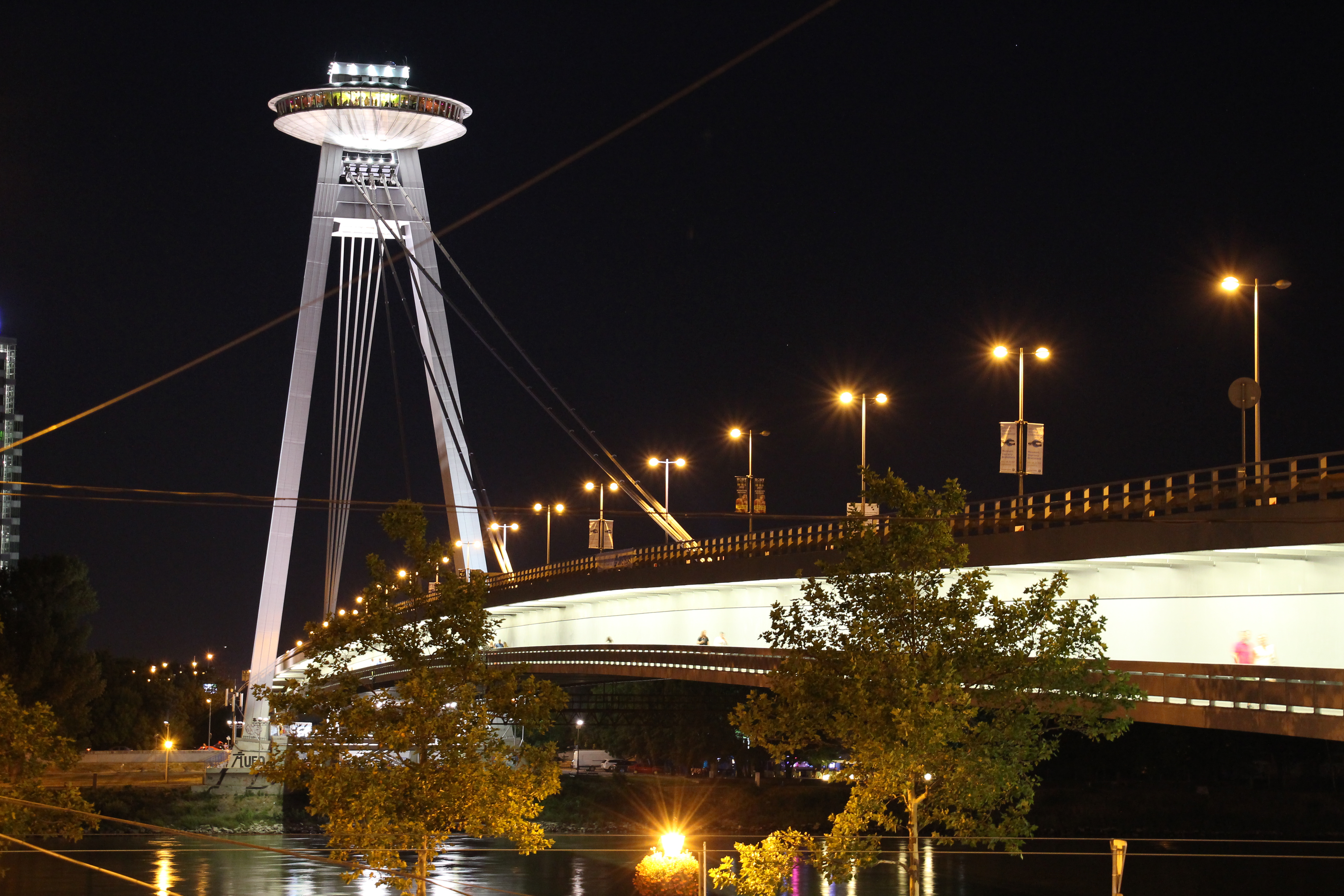
Bratislava - Most SNP (7)

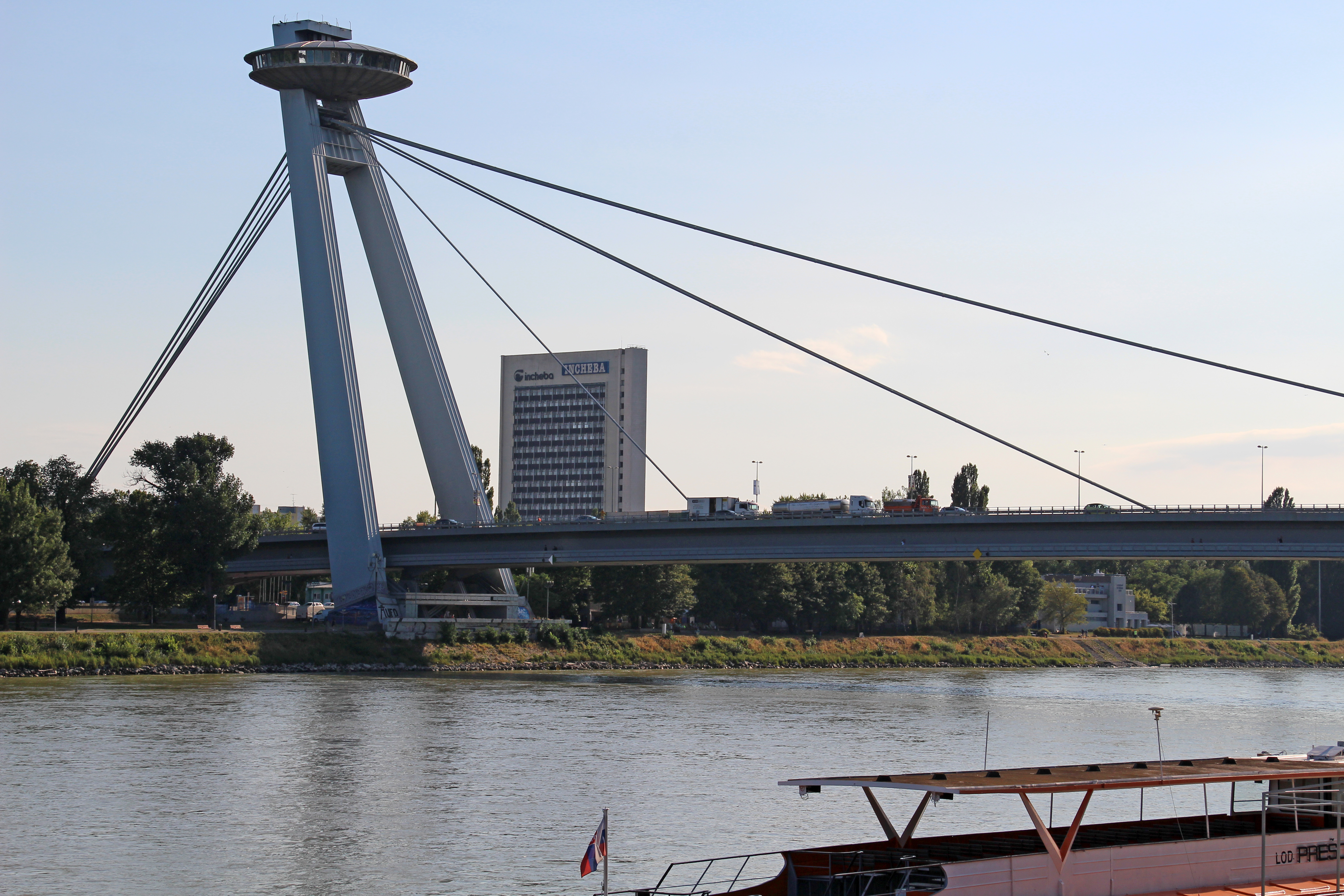
Bratislava - Most SNP (3)

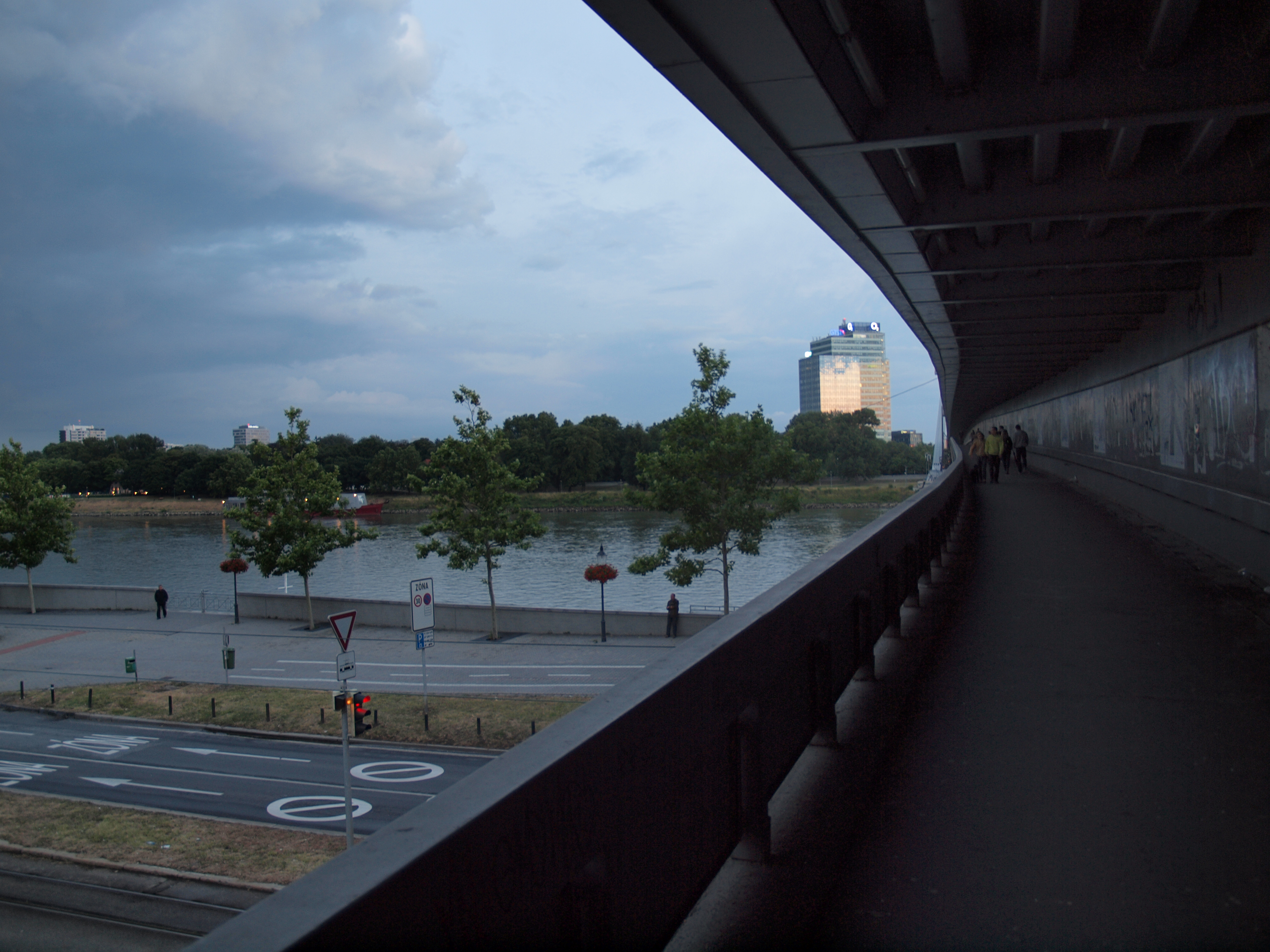
Pedestrian section of Most SNP, Bratislava, Slovakia

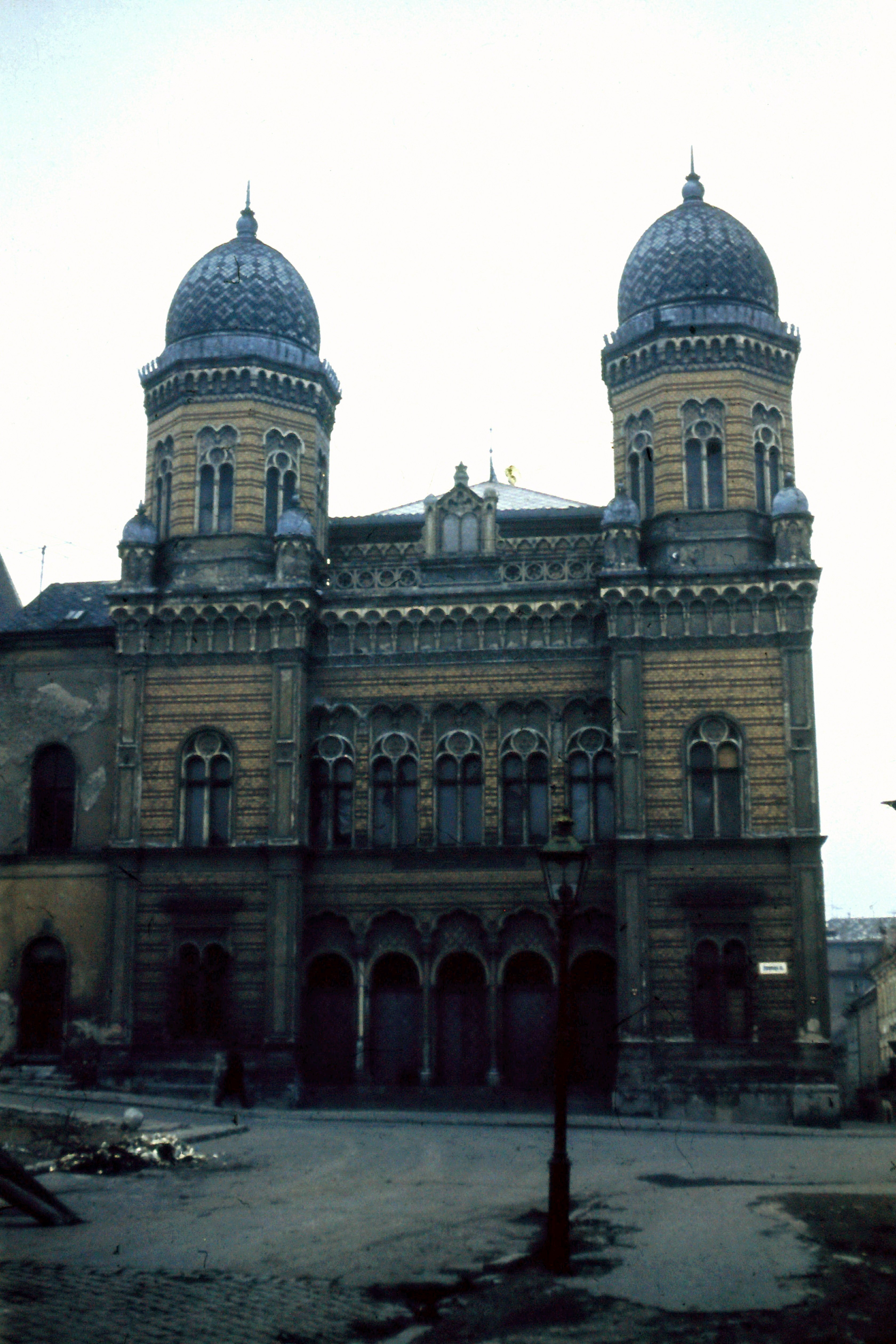
Bratislava Neolog synagogue destroyed for the sake of SNP Bridge

SNP
pedestrians	yes
cars	yes
buses	yes
bikes	yes
trams	no
trains	no
gas or water pipelines	no

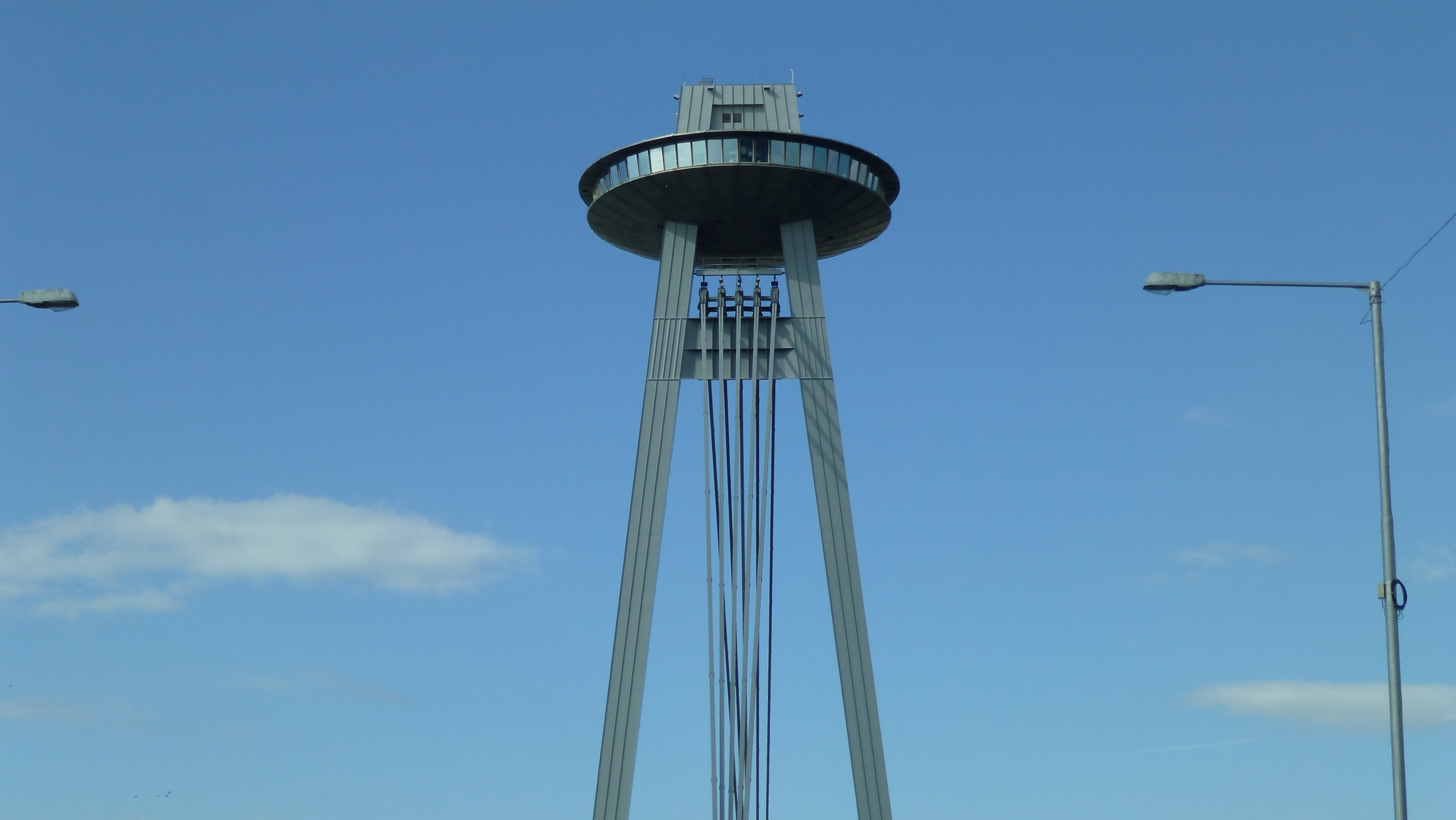
UFO Restaurant

=== Tourism ===
An interesting tourist place is the restaurant on the top of the SNP Bridge's pylon placed in the height of 95 metres. The restaurant, opened on the 26th of August 1972 has 2 bars and a capacity of 200 people, and is most importantly named UFO (formerly Bystrica) thanks to its shape. The restaurant is connected with the observation platform, from where the visibility can be up to 100 kilometres. An elevator which can take you to the bar in 45 seconds is placed in the eastern pillar, while the western pillar contains emergency stairs.

=== Interesting facts ===
Since 2016, the bridge can tell the weather for the next day with light signals. The lights are turned on in the evening, red is for windy weather, green is for cloudy or foggy weather, yellow is for sunny weather and blue is for rainy weather. The bridge reports the weather every 15 minutes with the certain color being on for 5 minutes. The lighting is provided information by the meteorological systems and is done by 24 LED reflectors placed on the restaurant.

== Old Bridge - Starý Most ==
Former names: Bridge of Franz Joseph; after the First World War Štefánik´s Bridge; after Second World War Bridge of Red Army.

Despite the short existence of a bridge from 15th century, the first bridge in Bratislava was the Bridge of Carolina Augusta, built in 1825 made of pontoon, after the previous wooden bridges wouldn't last too long. This one lasted until 1891. New bridge was built 1889 - 1890 named after Franz Joseph I. It was a combined bridge for road traffic, railway and pedestrian. In times of the First Czecho-Slovak Republic it was named Štefánik's Bridge and a railway went through into Vienna.

From 2014 to 2016 there was a great reconstruction held. On the Danube's floor underneath the bridge were found two objects that were in fact an ammunition, so the repairs were postponed.

The bridge is today open for pedestrians, cyclists and tram transportation.

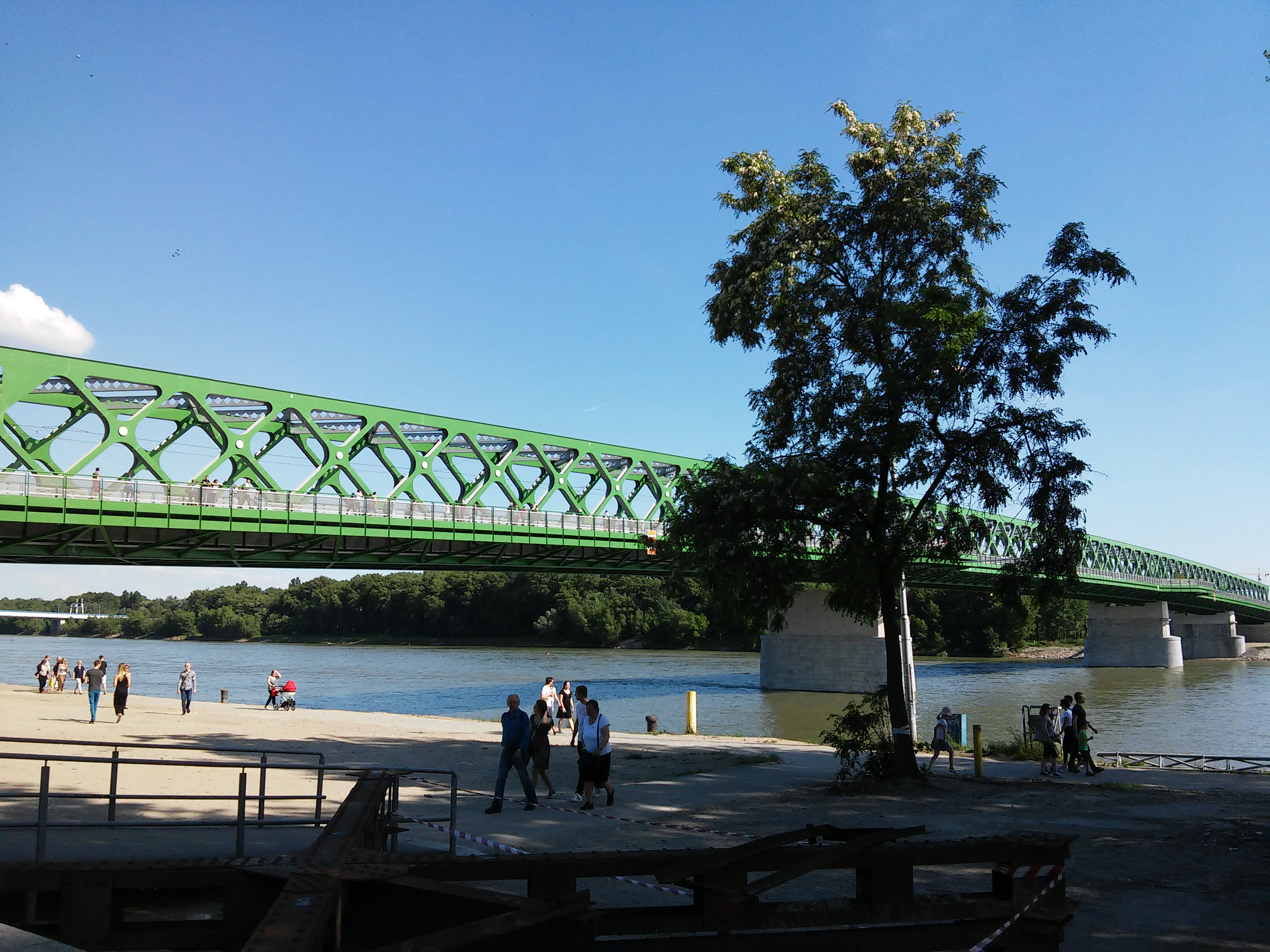
Old Bridge

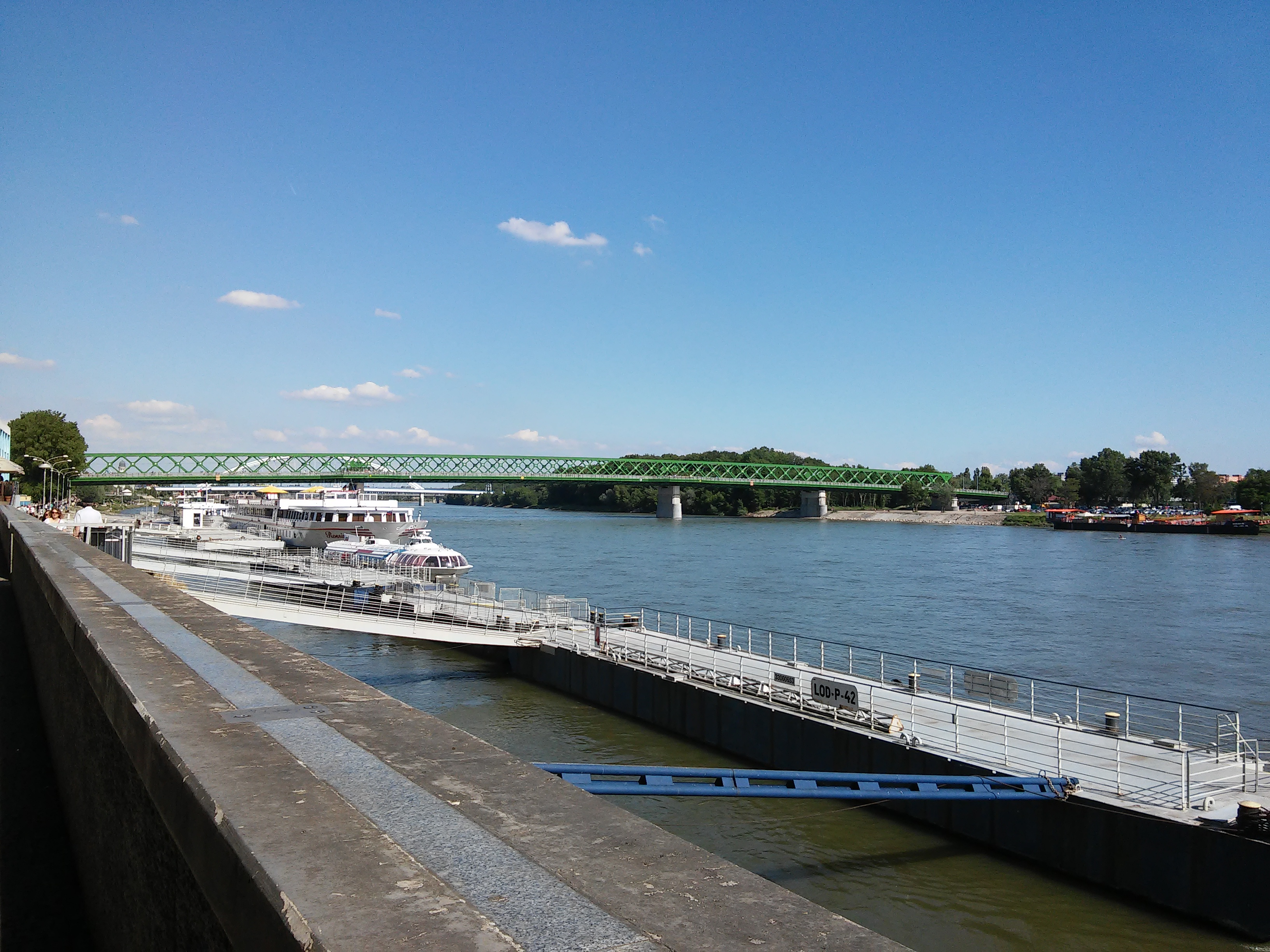
Old Bridge

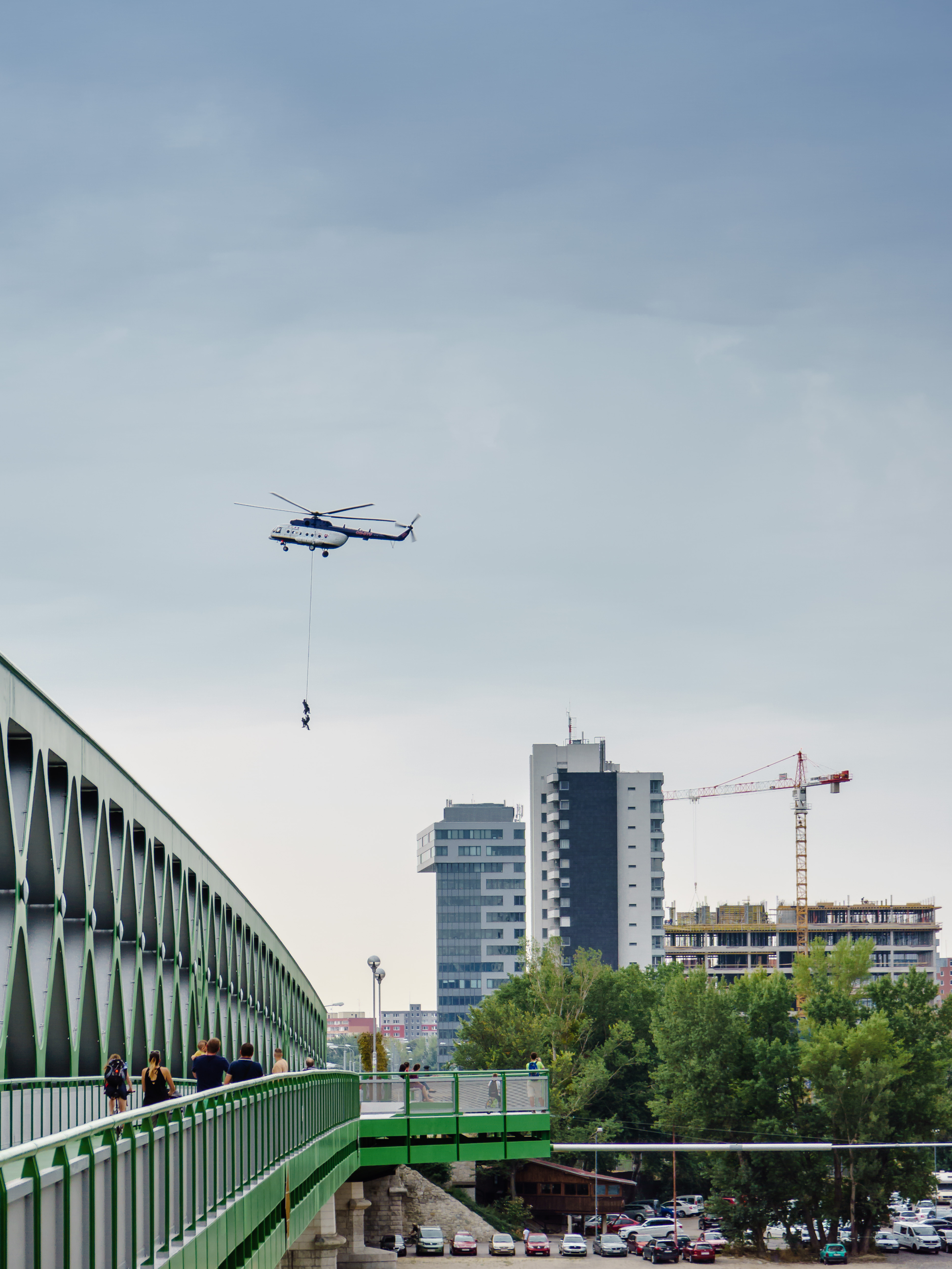
Bratislava Stary most Helicopter

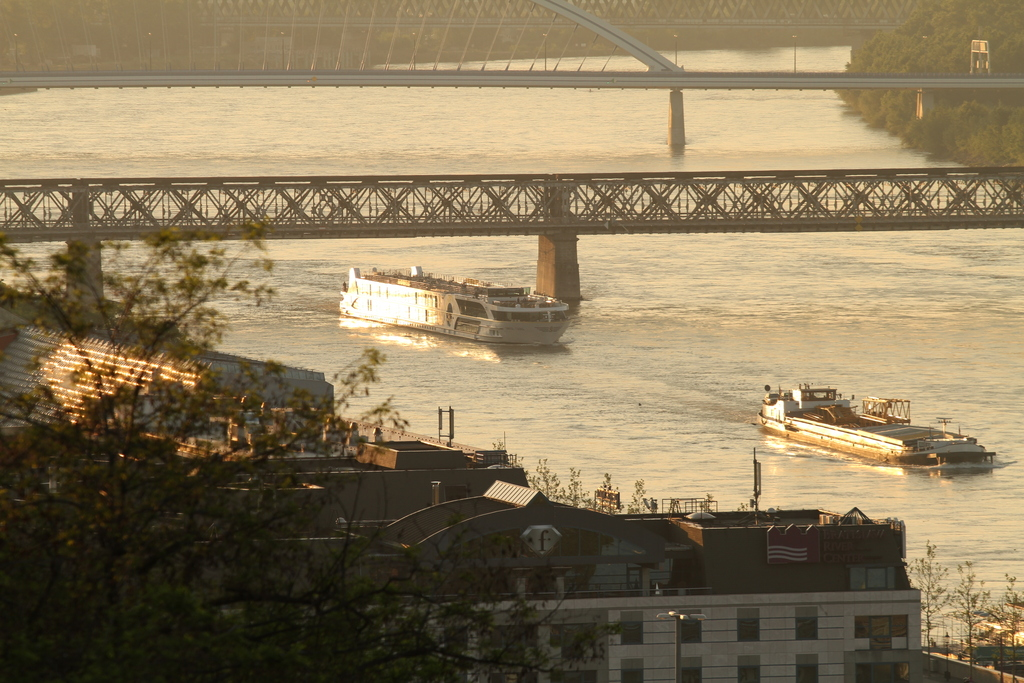
Bratislava ships under Starý Most

Old Bridge - Starý Most
pedestrians	yes
cars	no - with the exception of emergency vehicles
buses	no - with exception of one line
bikes	yes
trams	yes
trains	no
gas or water pipelines	no

== Apollo Bridge ==
The Apollo Bridge is an arched bridge, located between the Old Bridge and the Harbour Bridge. The full length is 835 metres, height of the arch is 36 metres. The bridge has 20 pillars. The Apollo Bridge was nominated by the American Technical Engineering Society along with four other world-class buildings at the prestigious Opal Awards in 2006. It was the only European building to be nominated that year.

The bridge was named after a refinery that once stood nearby, which was named after the deity of Apolon. The bridge was built between 2002 - 2005. It was built on floating pontoons.

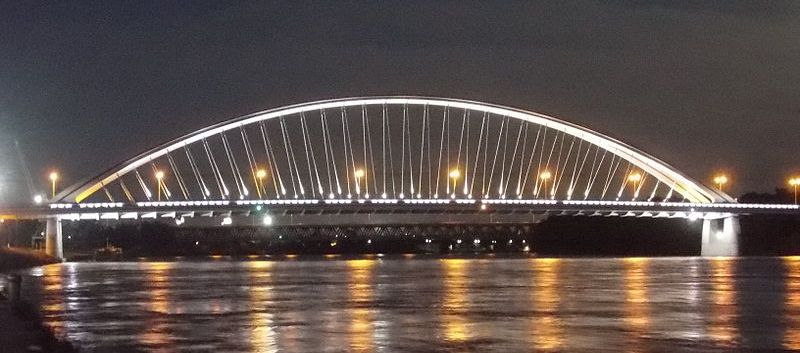
Apollo bridge at night

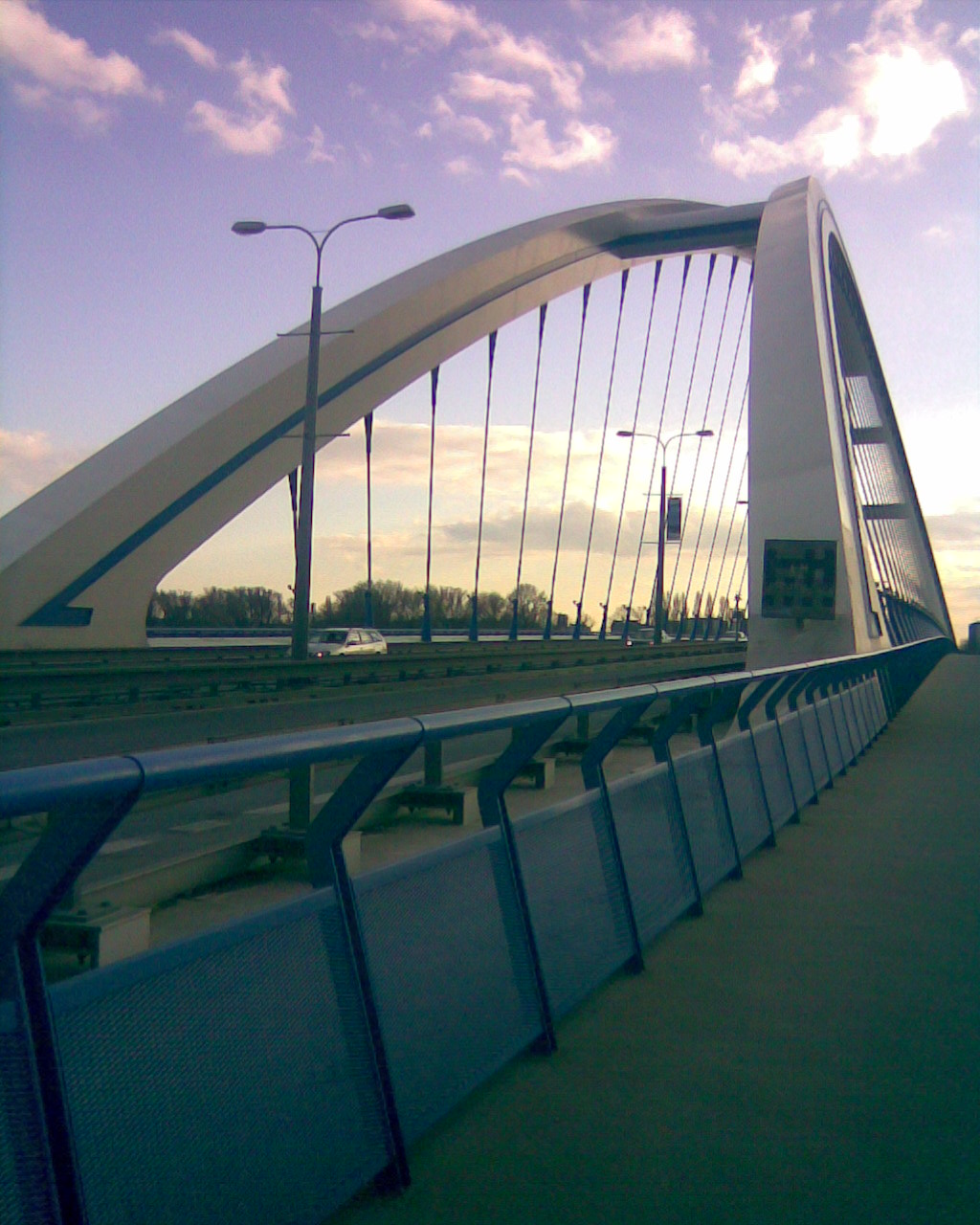
Apollo bridge1

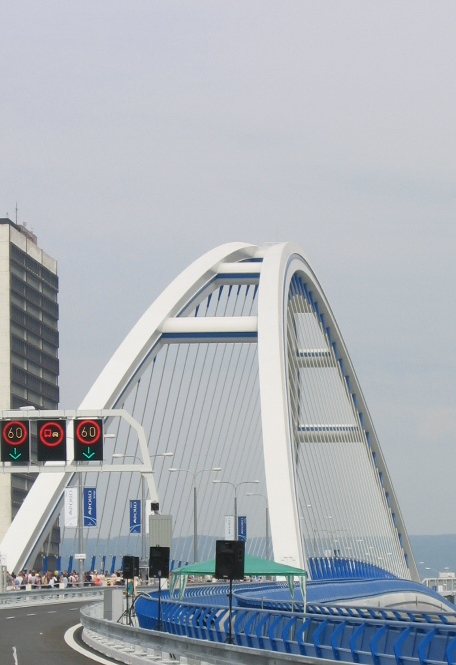
Apollo bridge

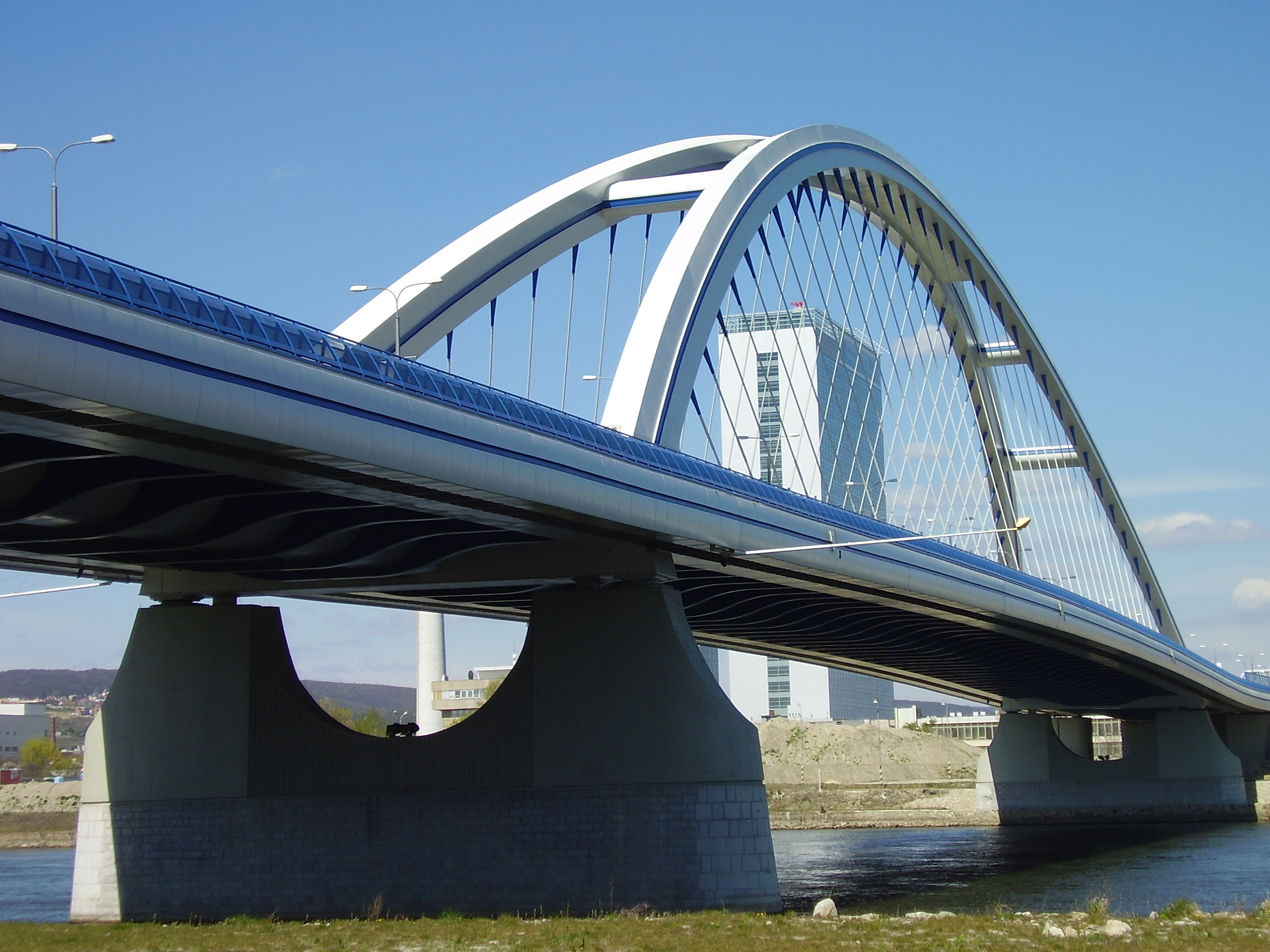
Apollo bridge

Apollo
pedestrians	yes
cars	yes
buses	yes
bikes	yes
trams	no
trains	no
gas or water pipelines	yes

== Harbour Bridge - Prístavný Most ==
Originally named Bridges of Dukla Heroes, the bridge is a two-floor, railway and highway bridge close to the Bratislava's Port. It is a part of the D1 motorway. Its length is 599,4 metres. There is also a pedestrian and cyclist section, water pipeline, gas pipeline and others. It was built within 1977 – 1985. Every day, 120.000 vehicles cross the bridge. It is the city's busiest bridge.

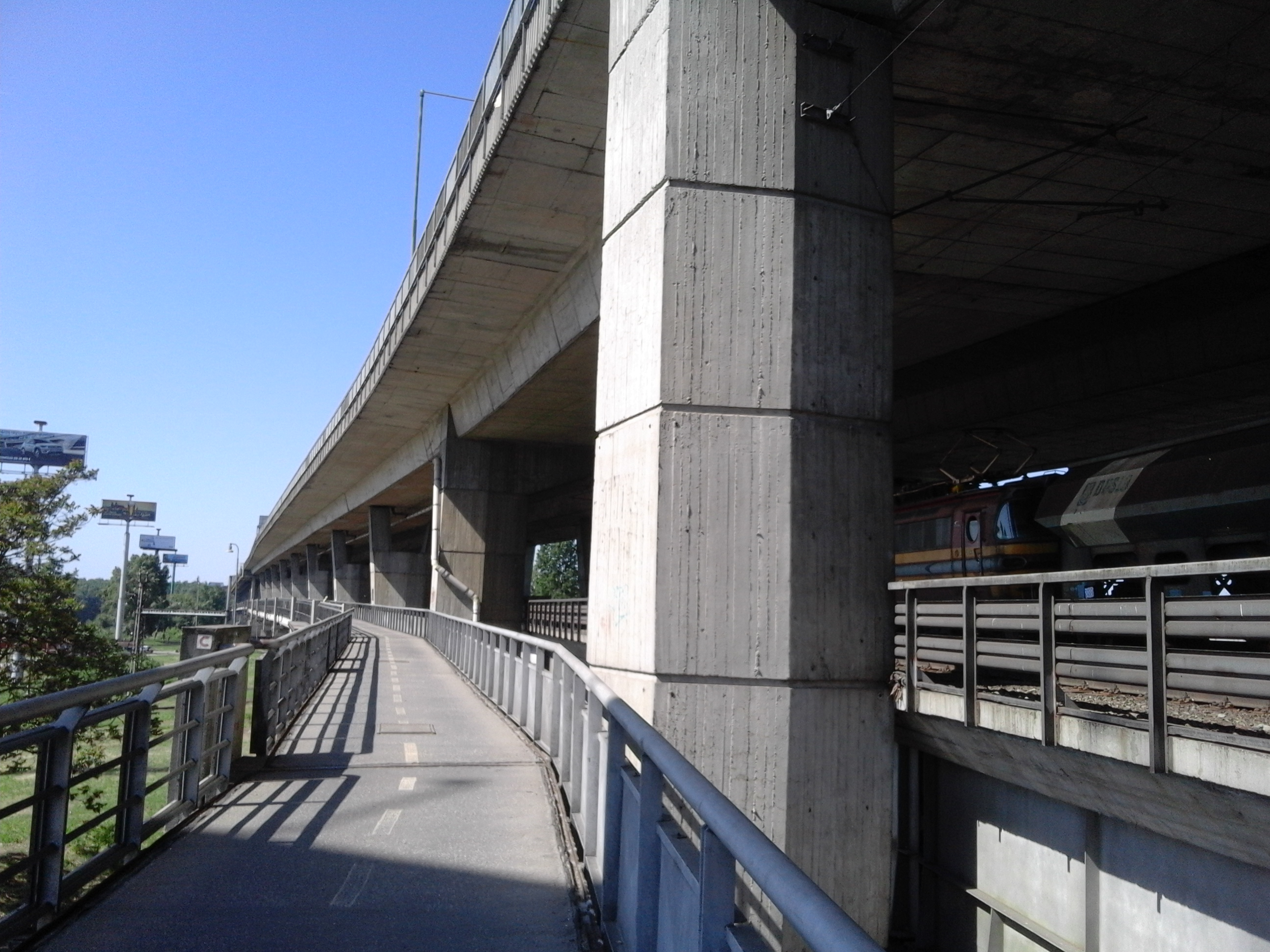
Cyclist route in Harbour Bridge

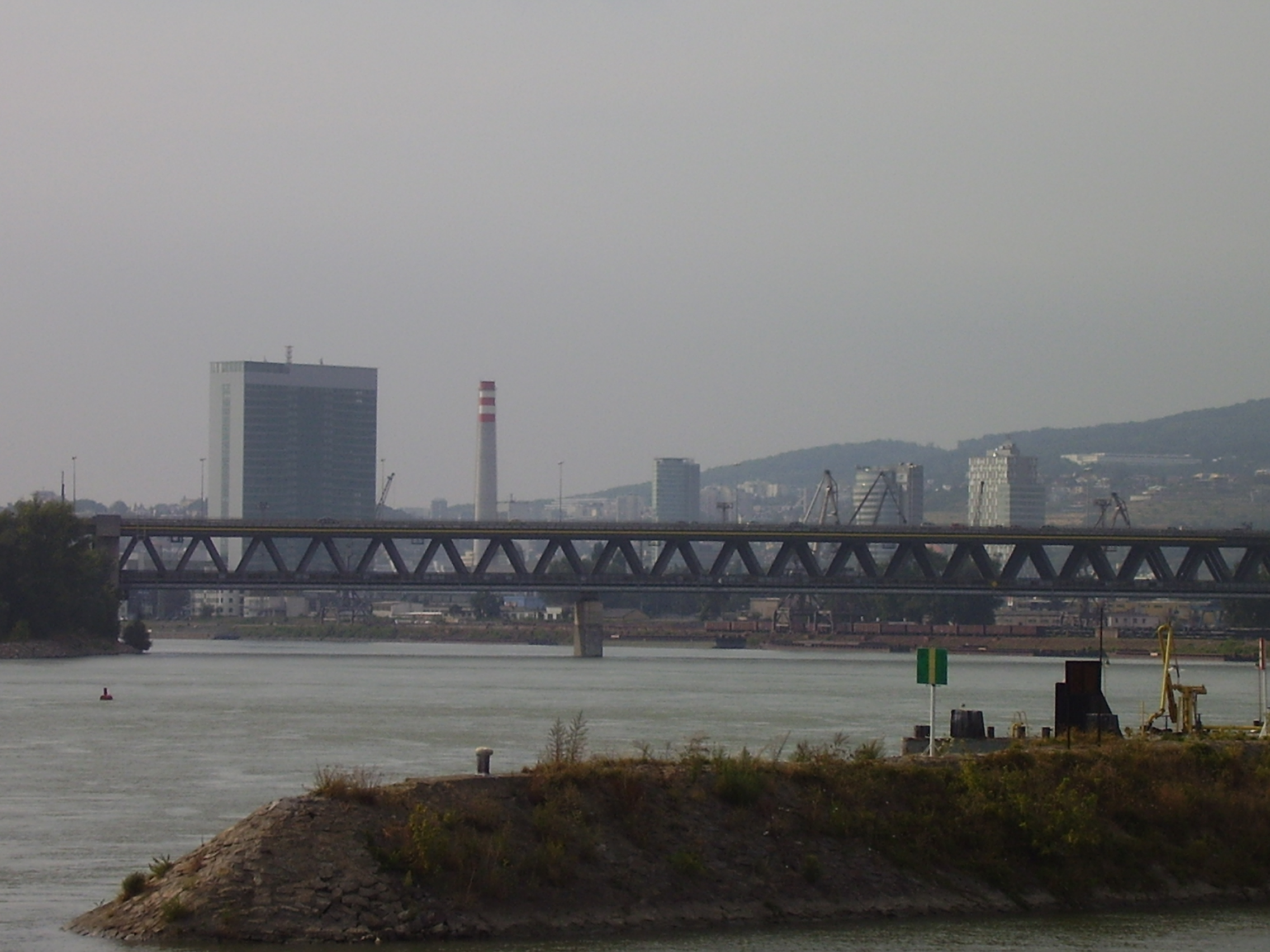
Bratislava

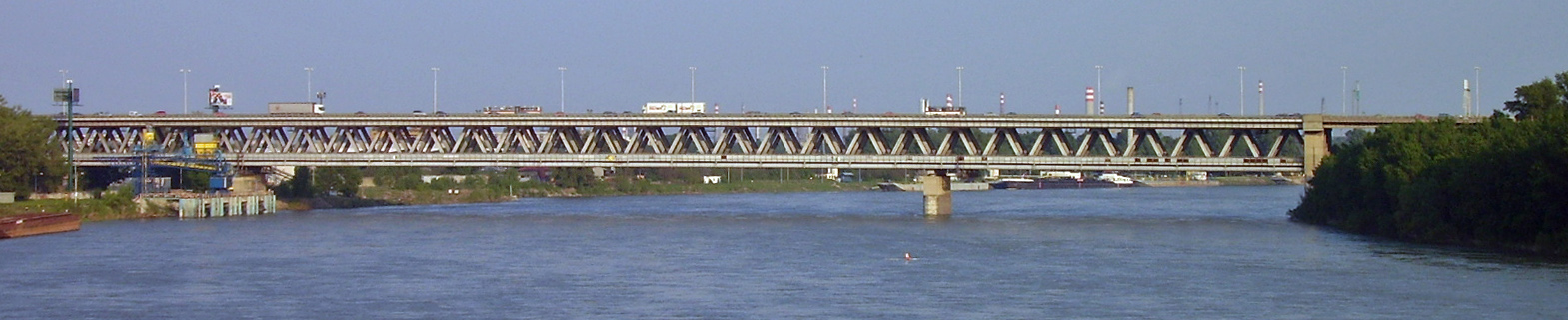
Prístavný most panorama

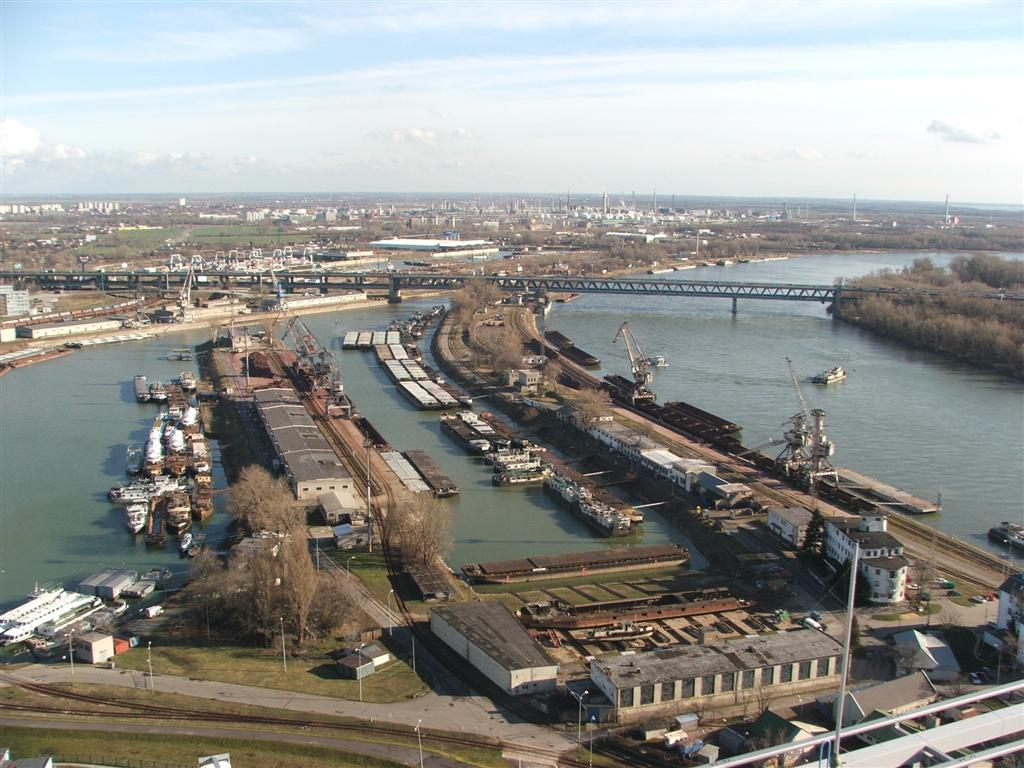
Winter Harbour and the Harbour Bridge

Harbour Bridge - Prístavný Most
pedestrians	yes
cars	yes
buses	yes
bikes	yes
trams	no
trains	yes
gas or water pipelines	yes

== Floodplain Bridge - Lužný Most ==
The newest bridge of all, its construction started in 2018. It was opened to the public on the 26th of September 2021. The bridge consists of multiple bridges connecting multiple arms of the river Danube and it is a part of the D4 motorway. It is 2928 meters long and 35 meters wide. The name was chosen by the people on a poll by the Ministry of Transport and Construction of Slovakia in 2020. The suggested name Lužný most, named after the rare landscape of Riparian forests (Slovak: Lužné lesy) nearby, won the poll with more than 50 000 votes.

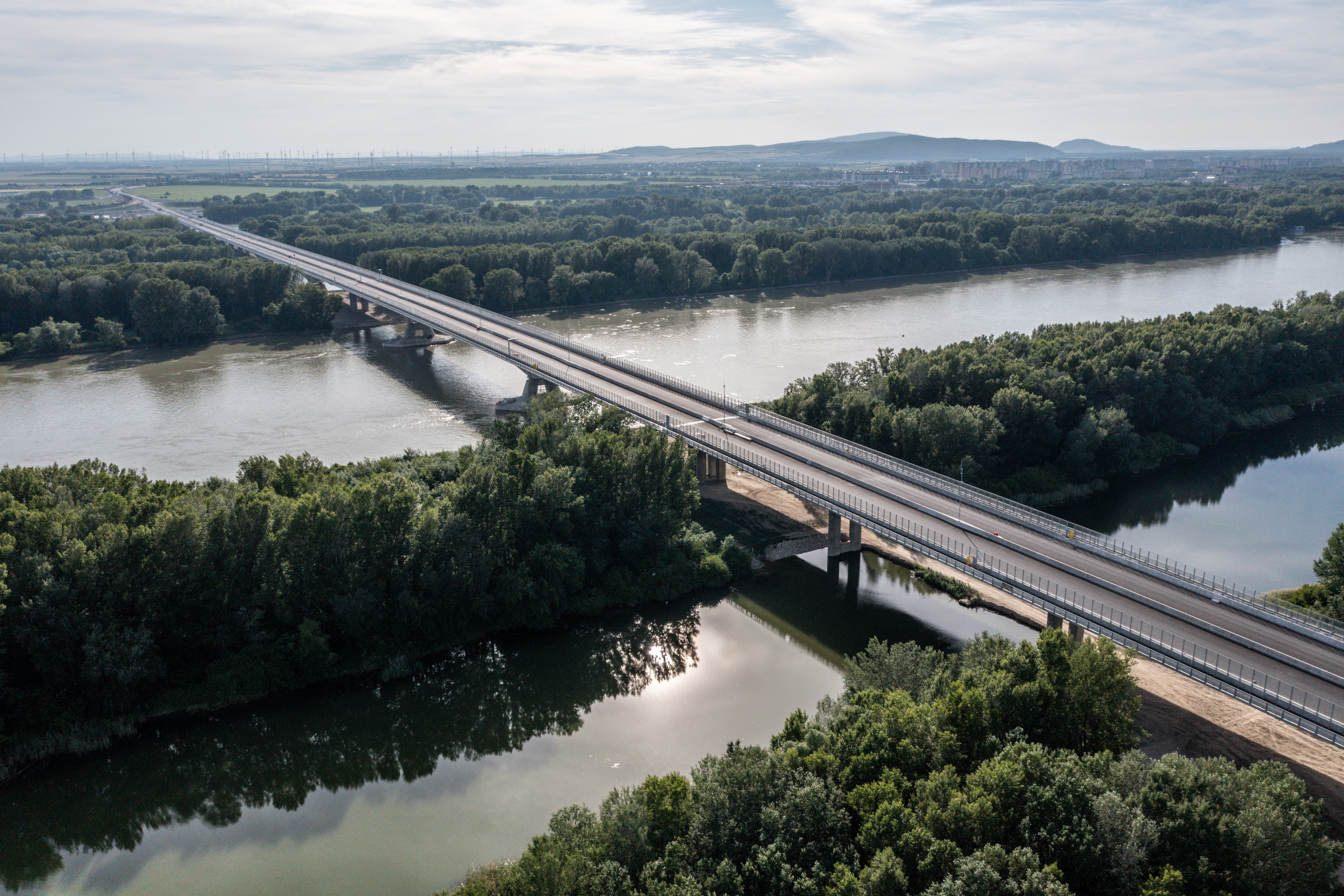
Lužný most

Floodplain Bridge - Lužný Most
pedestrians	no
cars	yes
buses	yes
bikes	yes
trams	no
trains	no
gas or water pipelines	-

== Red Bridge - Červený Most ==
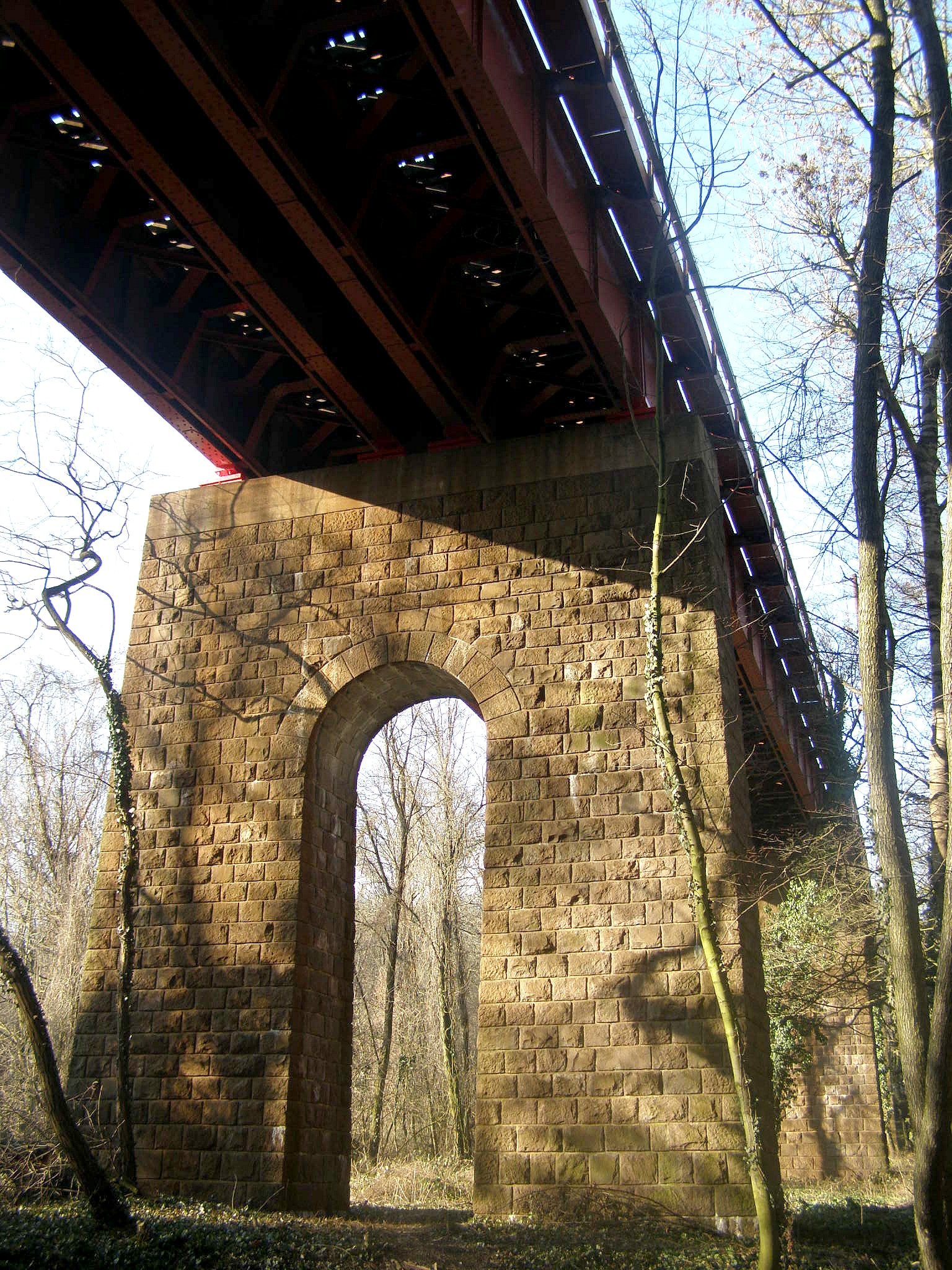
Red Bridge, Bratislava

A railway bridge located in the district of Mlynská Dolina crossing the spring valley of Vydrica stream. It was built in 1848. It is 215 metres long. Originally, it was a brick bridge supported by nine arches until the German army destroyed it in 1945, with a fragment of a pillar remaining intact. The current bridge was rebuilt in 1948 in a steel version, carrying the same name and painted red. This railway bridge is a part of the historically important railway route connecting Bratislava with Vienna.

Red Bridge - Červený Most
pedestrians	no
cars	no
buses	no
bikes	no
trams	no
trains	yes
gas or water pipelines	no
