= Gödöllő =

- Town
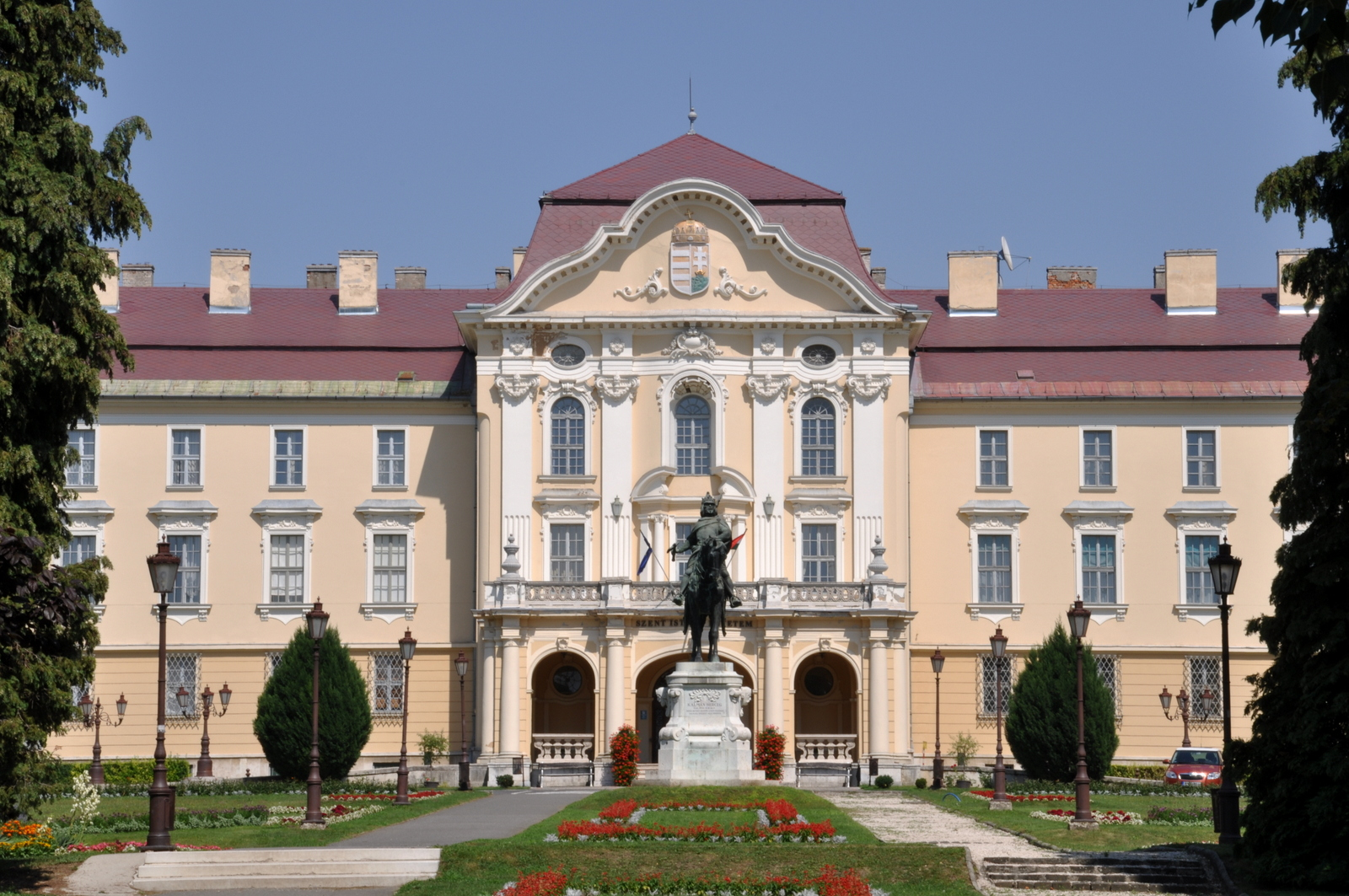
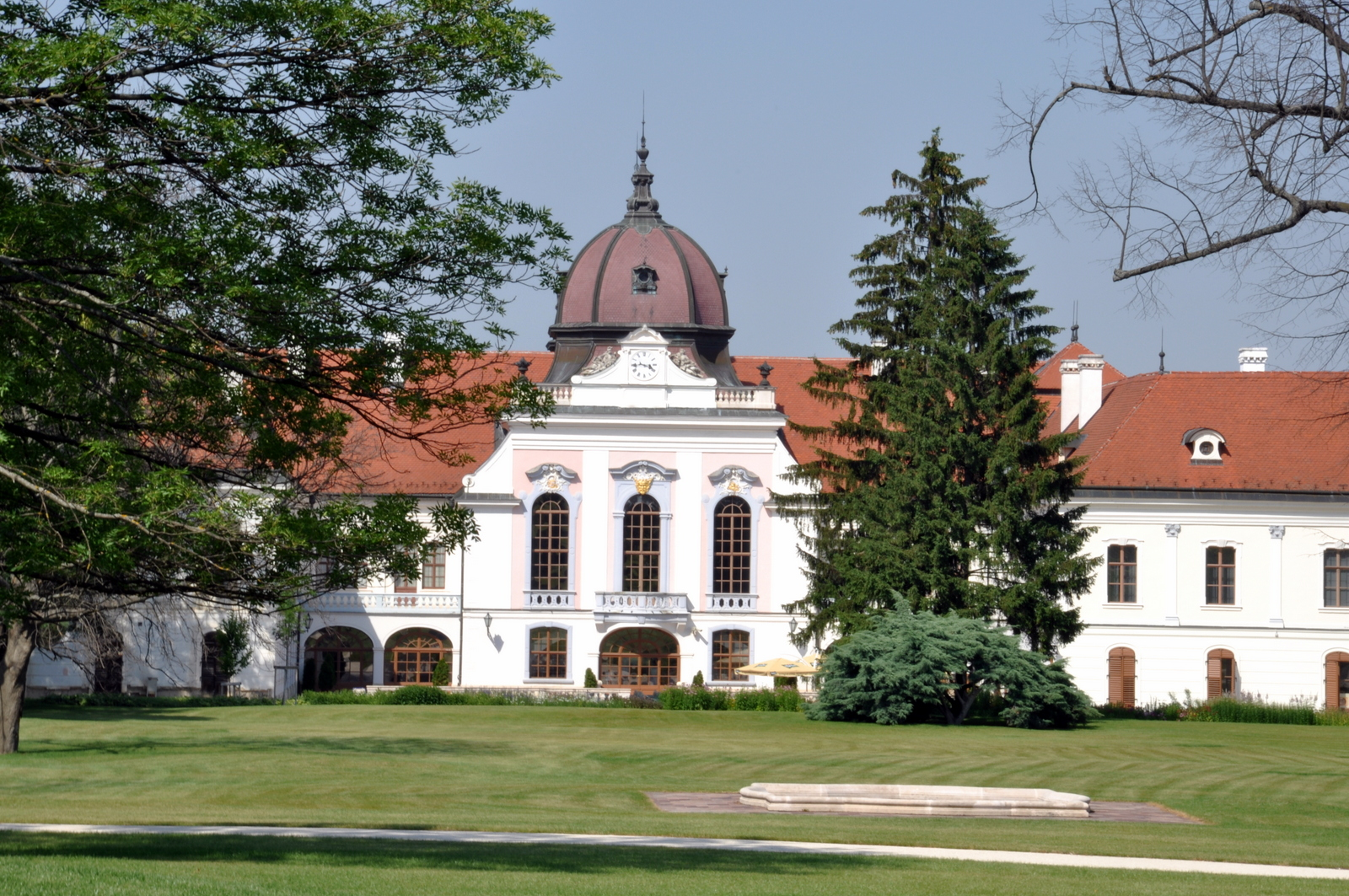
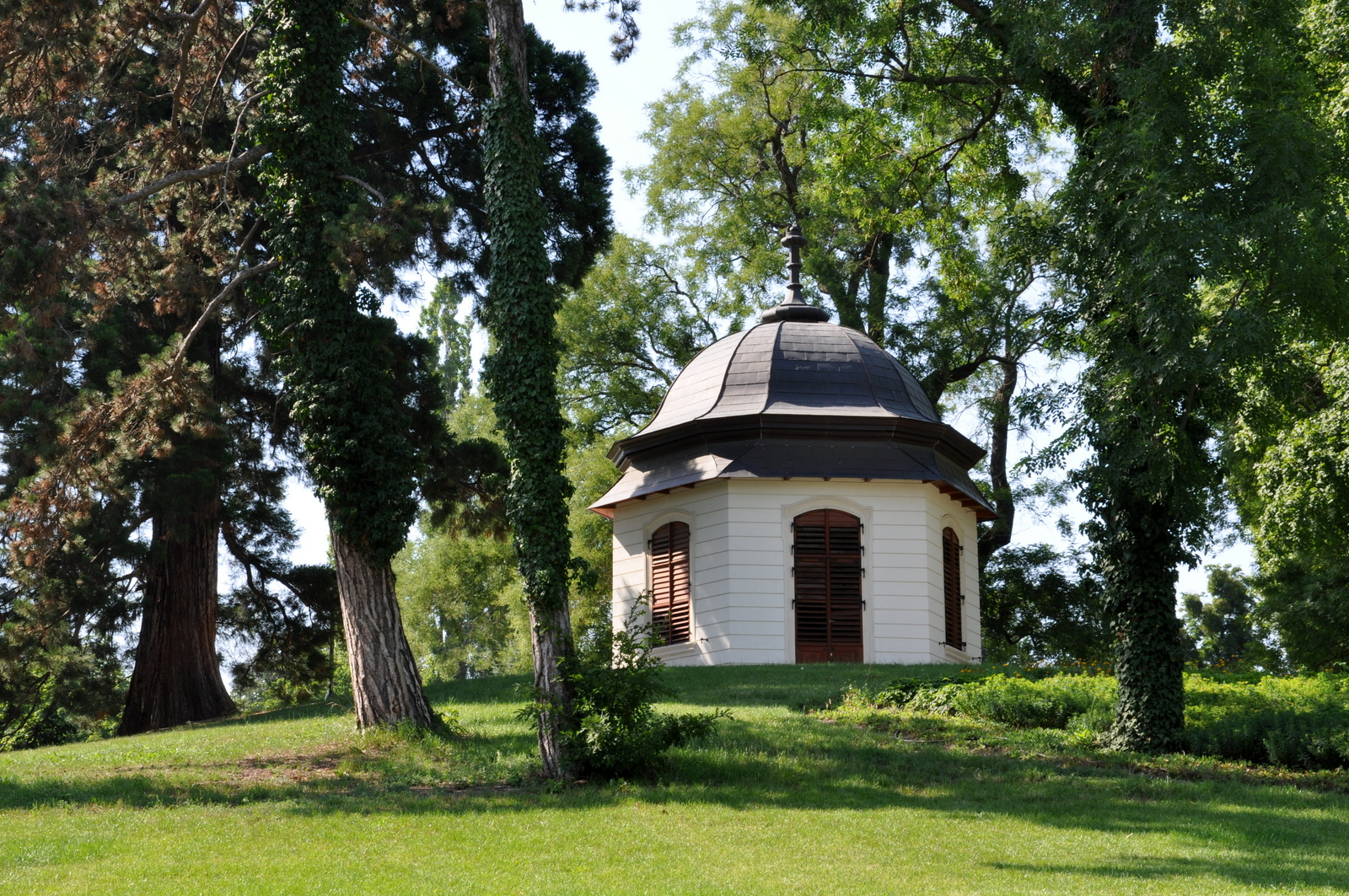
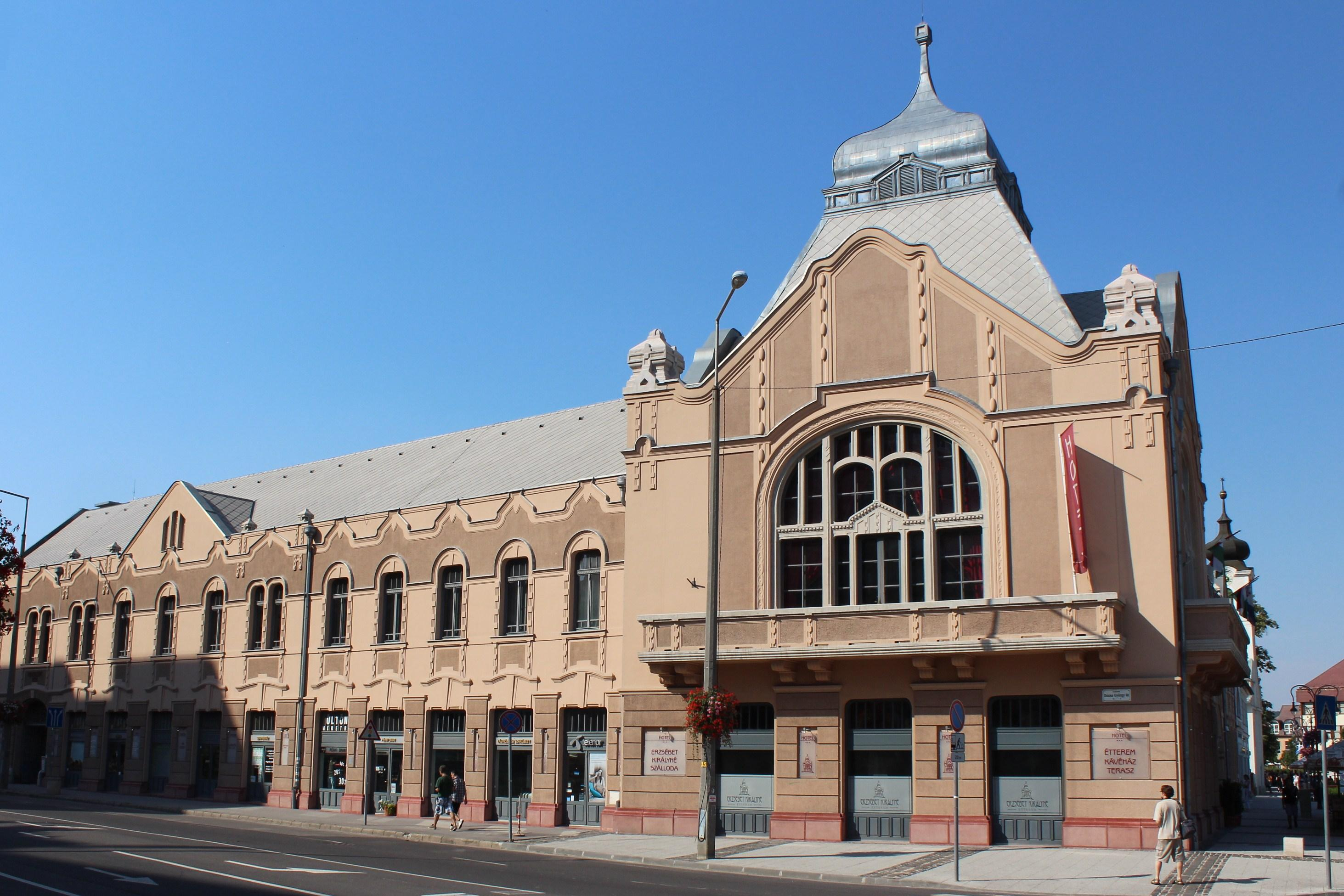
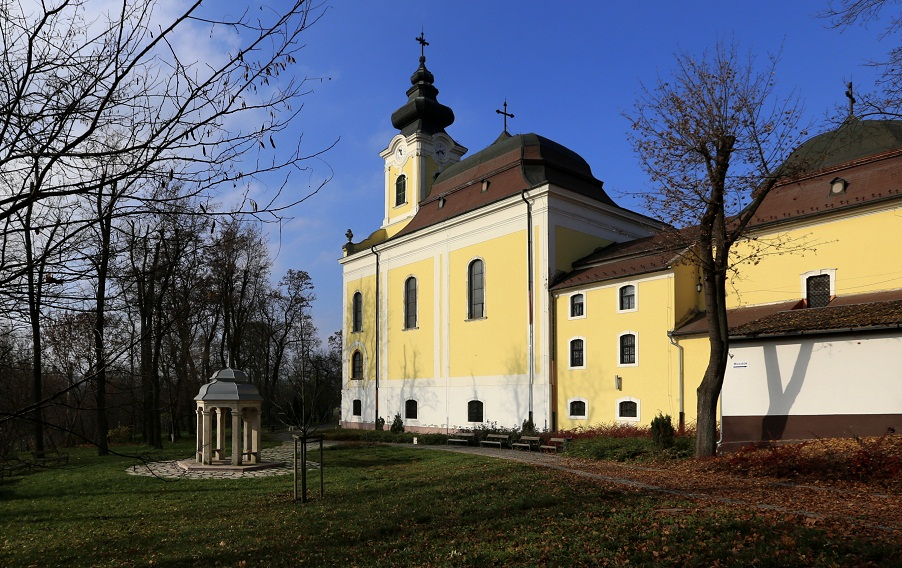
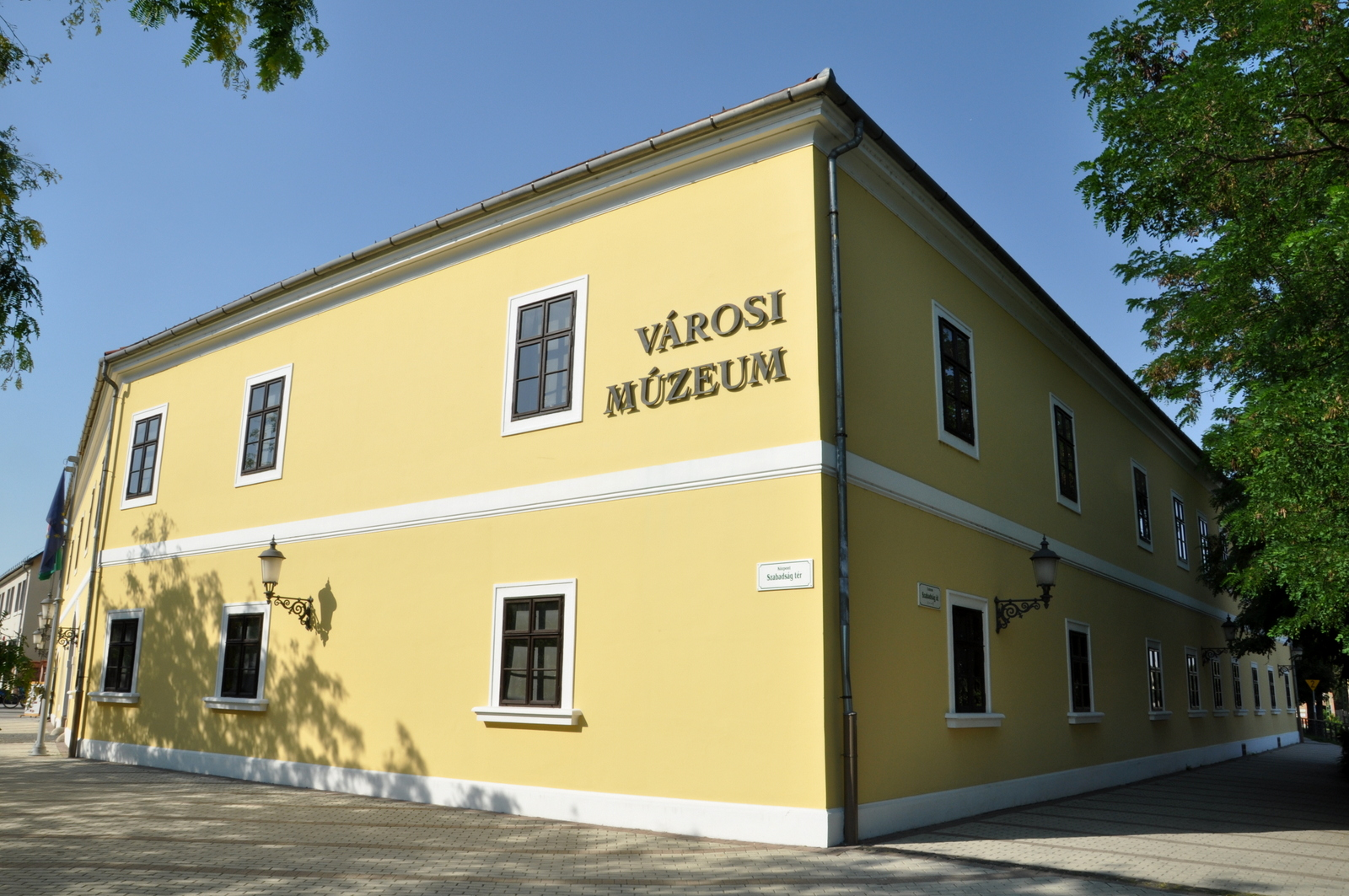
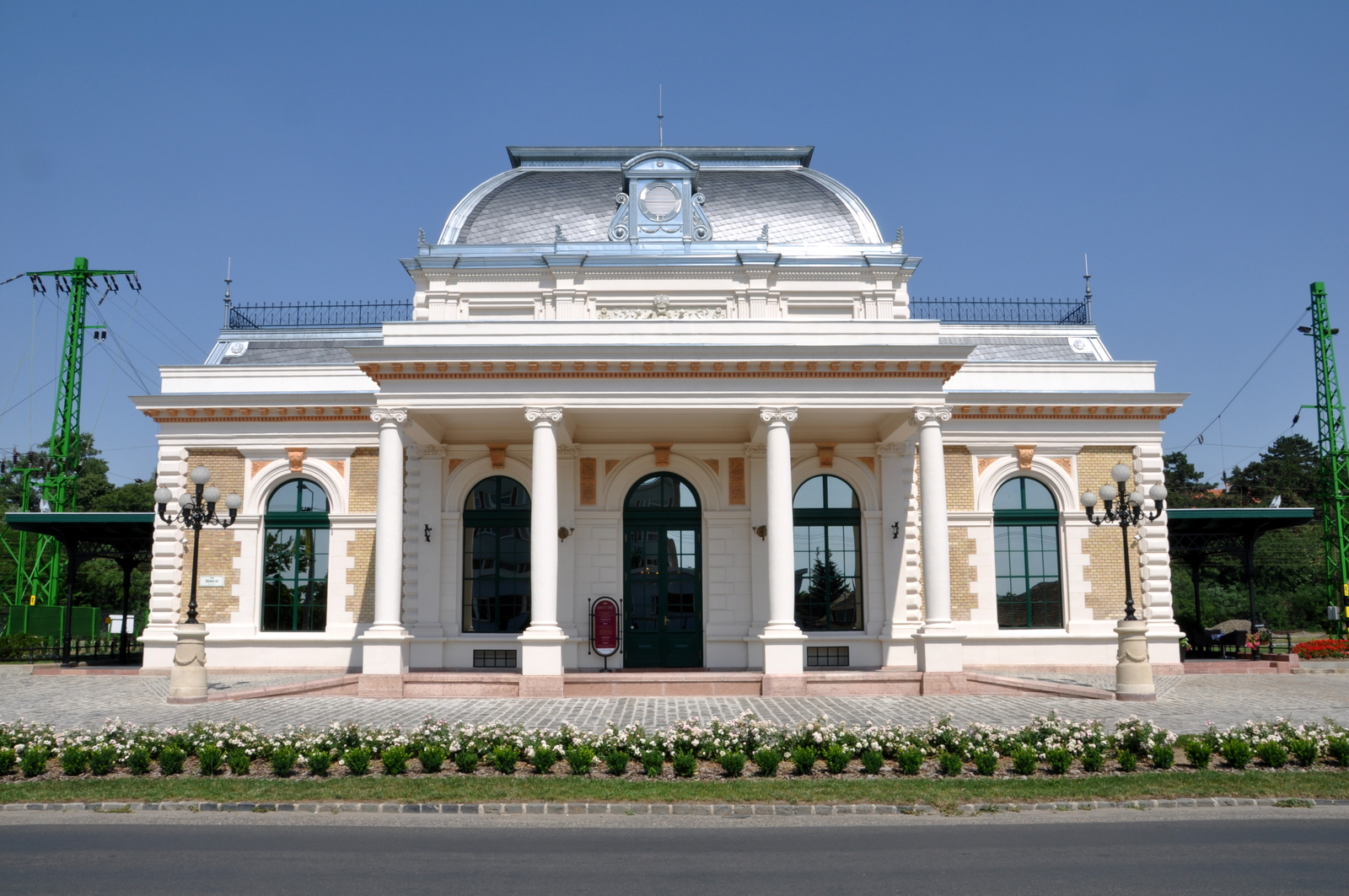
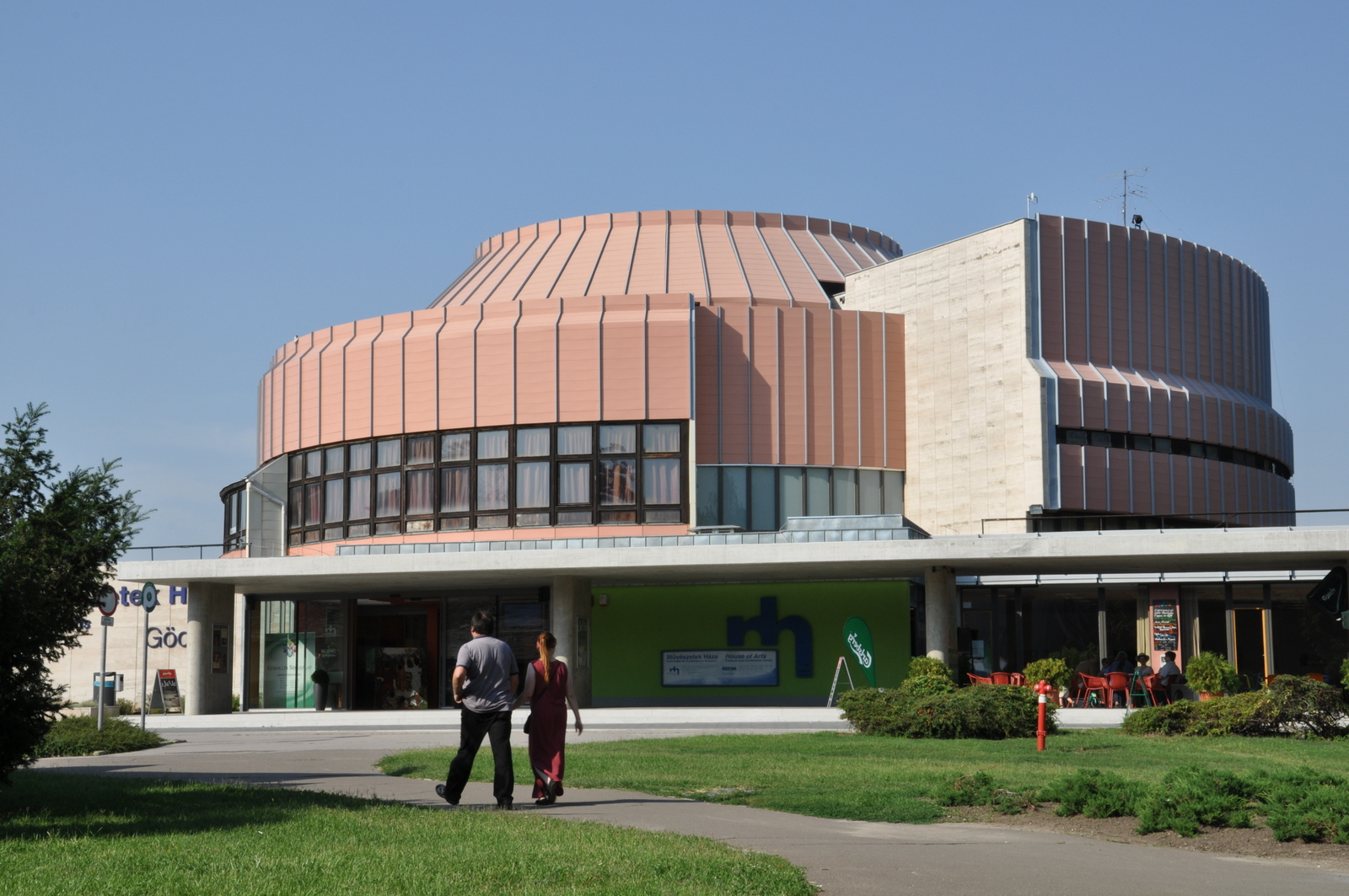
- Descending from top: Main building of the Szent István University, Gödöllő Palace, Royal Pavilion, Hotel Queen Elisabeth, Basilica of Our Lady of Assumption (in Máriabesnyő), Old Town Hall, Royal Waiting Room, House of Arts

- Flag Coat of arms
- Nickname: City of Sissi
- Location of Gödöllő Gödöllő (Europe)
- Coordinates: 47°36′0.00″N 19°22′0.12″E
- Country: Hungary
- Region: Central Hungary
- County: Pest
- District: Gödöllő
- Settled: 1349
- Incorporated: 1868

Government
  - Mayor: György Gémesi

Area
  - Town: 61.92 km^{2} (23.91 sq mi)
  - Land: 58.36 km^{2} (22.53 sq mi)
  - Water: 3.56 km^{2} (1.37 sq mi)
  - Rank: 97th in Hungary
- Elevation: 207 m (679 ft)
- Highest elevation: 317 m (1,040 ft)
- Lowest elevation: 189 m (620 ft)

Population (2017)
  - Town: 32,408
  - Rank: 29th
  - Density: 511.53/km^{2} (1,324.9/sq mi)
  - Urban: 104,471
  - Demonym: gödöllői

Population by ethnicity
  - Hungarians: 94.4%
  - Gypsies: 1.1%
  - Germans: 0.6%
  - Slovaks: 0.4%
  - Ukrainians: 0.1%
  - Poles: 0.05%
  - Romanians: 0.04%
  - Others: 3.31%

Population by religion
  - Roman Catholic: 52.0%
  - Greek Catholic: 1.2%
  - Atheists: 15.3%
  - Calvinists: 14.8%
  - Lutherans: 3.1%
- Time zone: UTC+1 (CET)
  - Summer (DST): UTC+2 (CEST)
- Postal code: 2100
- Area code: (+36) 28
- Motorways: M3, M31
- Distance from Budapest: 30.7 km (19.1 mi) Southwest
- Website: godollo.hu

Gödöllő, (Note: Hungarian: [ˈɡødølløː]; German: Getterle; Slovak: Jedľovo) officially the City of Gödöllő, (Note: Hungarian: Gödöllő Város) is a city in Pest County, Budapest metropolitan area, Hungary, about 30 km (20 mi) northeast from the outskirts of Budapest. Its population is 34,396 according to the 2010 census and is growing rapidly. It can be easily reached from Budapest with the suburban railway (HÉV), and national railway (MÁV-START).

Gödöllő is home to the Szent István University, the main education institute of agriculture in Hungary. The palace at Gödöllő was originally built for the aristocratic Grassalkovich family; Franz Josef, Emperor of Austria and King of Hungary and his wife Elisabeth ("Sisi") later had their summer residence here.

Communism saw much of the town's original one-storey housing levelled to make way for the blocks of flats which continue to dominate the town centre, as well as much of the Royal Forest and Elisabeth's Park levelled for industrial use.

== History ==
=== Early Ages ===
The city has been inhabited since the Neolithic period, as shown by archaeological discoveries. Around 5,000 BC, the Transdanubian culture, known for its line-ornate pottery, lived in the region.

=== Ancient times ===
The earliest evidence of occupation is from the Roman period. The Devil's Dykes (Hungarian: Ördögárok) is situated south from Gödöllő. It is also known as the Csörsz árka ("Csörsz Ditch") or the Limes Sarmatiae (Latin for "Sarmatian border"), are several lines of Roman fortifications built mostly during the reign of Constantine I (312–337).

=== Turkish rule ===
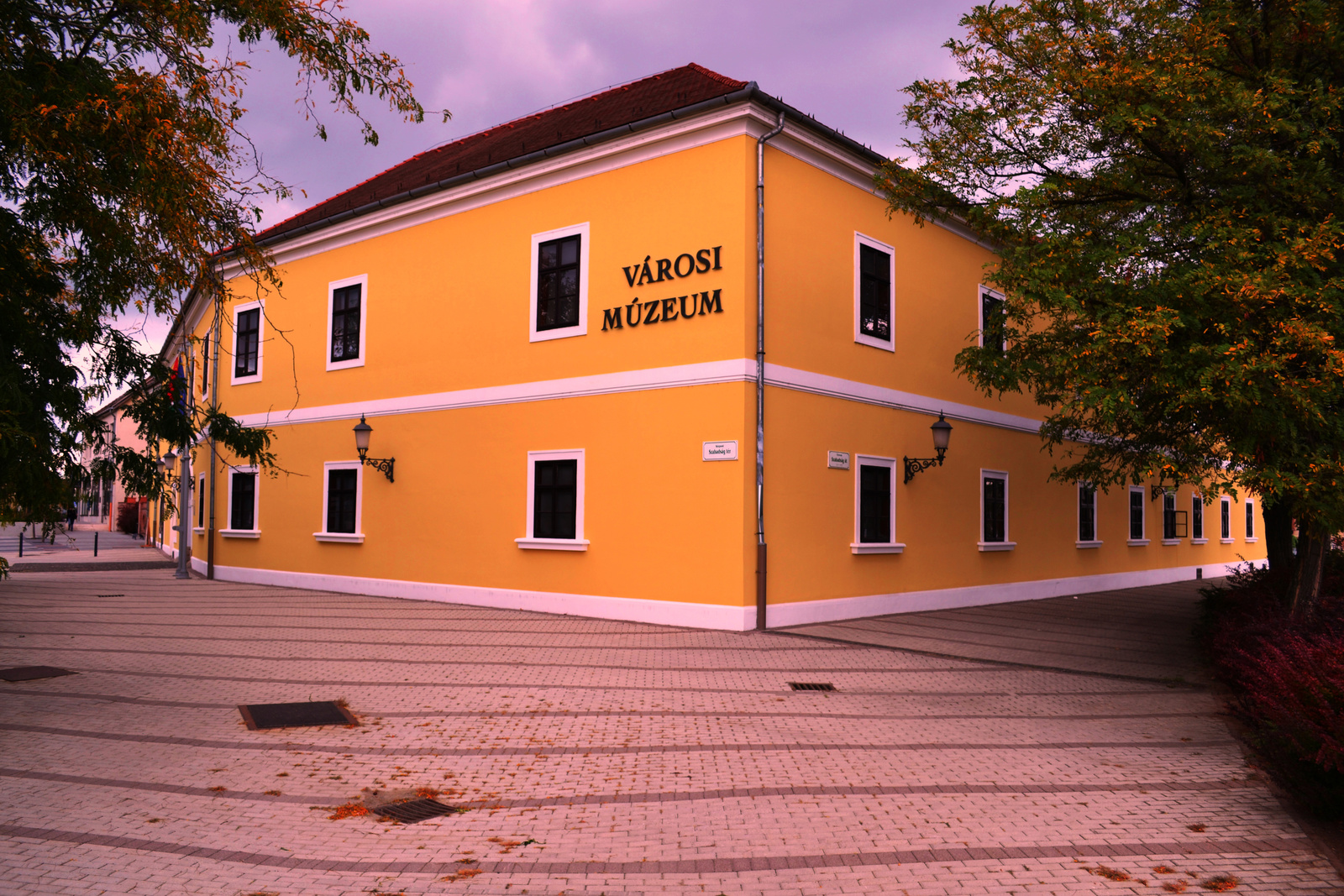
Hamvay Mansion, now the Town Museum

After the disastrous defeat at Mohács in 1526, the invading Turkish troops occupied Buda and then Gödöllő, too. As a result of this, the population decreased to merely a few families. No data on property rights during the 160-year-long Turkish rule remain.

By the mid-17th century, Gödöllő again became a village. Its proprietor, Ferenc Hamvay, was the first owner who resided in the locality, in his country house in the village centre. At that time, the village consisted of a few houses with walls of wattle and daub and thatched roofs in addition to the mansion and the reform church.

=== Habsburg rule ===
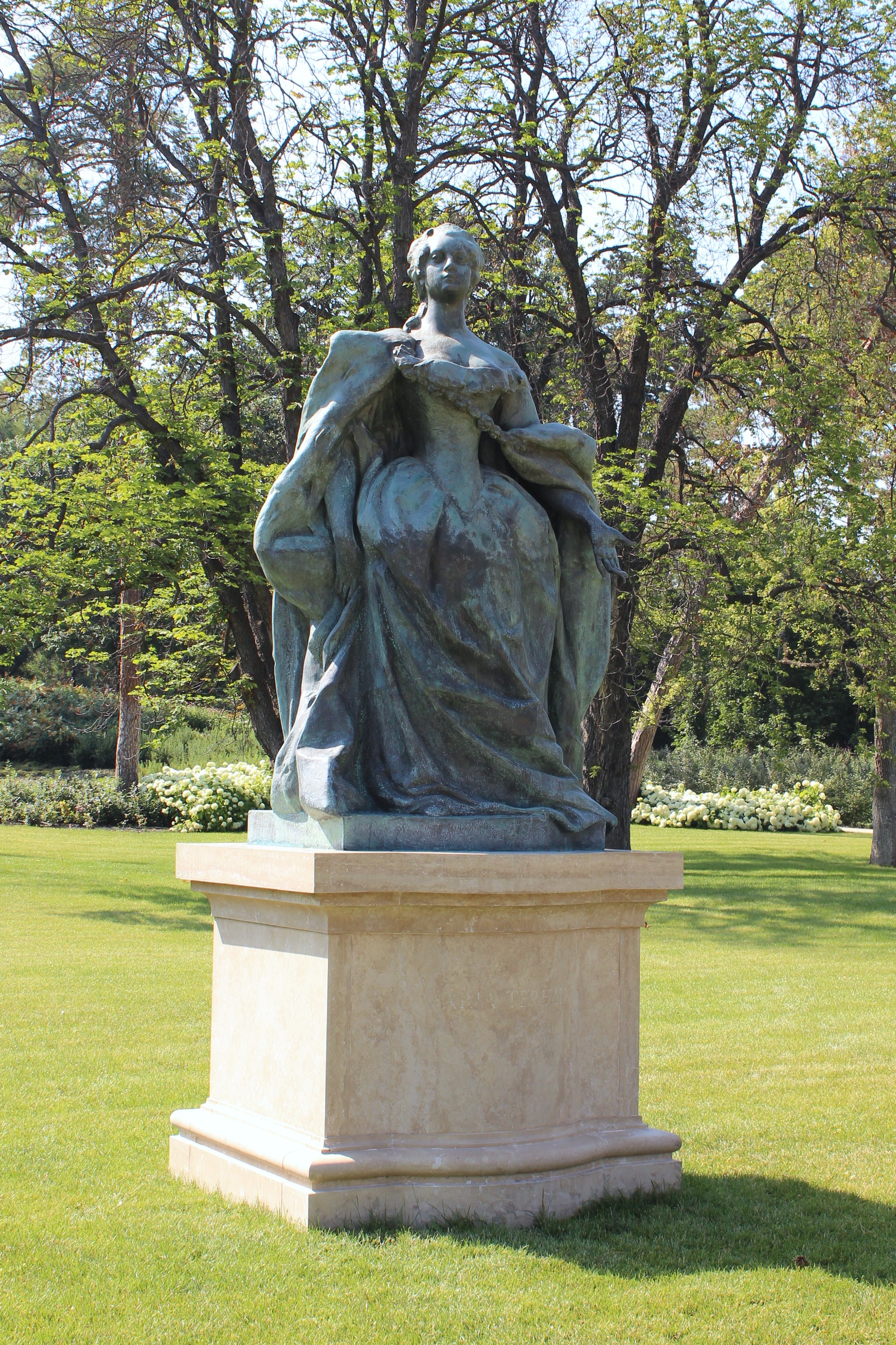
Queen Maria Theresa

A decisive turn in the life of Gödöllő was brought about by Antal Grassalkovich I (1694–1771), one of the most notable noblemen of 18th-century Hungary. Grassalkovich, born of an impoverished family of the minor nobility, began his career as a lawyer in 1715. A year later he was already working with the "Hofkammer" (the Royal Chamber, a body of the Habsburg financial administration in the 16–18th centuries). In 1727, he became president of the Commission of New Acquisitions (Neoaquistica Commissio), dealing with the revision and arrangement of the chaotic ownership rights after the Turkish rule. It was in this capacity that he first came across the estate of Gödöllő, whose then proprietress, Krisztina Bossányi, could verify her ownership rights.

Increasing in political power and wealth, Grassalkovich planned the development of a large estate, having its centre in Gödöllő. This became possible after the death of Krisztina Bossányi in 1737, when Grassalkovich successively purchased the properties from her heirs. He began to build his palatial residence as early as 1741, which, as the greatest Baroque manor house in Hungary, is even today the principal landmark of Gödöllő.

Grassalkovich, who curried favour with King Charles III and Queen Maria Theresa, also managed very successfully the properties of the treasury. For his economic and political abilities, he received first the title of baron and later on became a count.

He took meticulous care in making his properties profitable and in keeping them in good order. On his estates, he built 33 churches, including the church in the holy place of Máriabesnyő, and the chapel of the mansion house in Gödöllő. In the centre of Gödöllő, he had rows of houses built and settled German artisans and craftsmen there, thereby increasing the number of Roman Catholics alongside the Reformed population. He added a storey to Hamvay House and made it operate as a retreat. In public places, Baroque works of art were also made on his initiative (such as the Calvary, the Column of the Holy Virgin, and the statue of St. John of Nepomuk). Owing to his village-planning activities, Gödöllő became a country town in 1763, with the right of holding markets.

The son of Grassalkovich I, Antal Grassalkovich II (1734–1794), who was raised to the rank of prince, cared little for the estate. He leased out the properties one after the other, liquidated the household in Gödöllő and moved to Vienna. Following his death, the estate, heavily charged with debts, was inherited by his son, Antal Grassalkovich III. He continued to increase the debts and died without offspring, hence the properties were inherited on the female line.

At that time, the mansion house came to be the scene of an important political event. In the course of the spring campaign of the 1848-1849 War of Independence, the Hungarian soldiers gained a victory in Isaszeg on 6 April 1849. After this, Lajos Kossuth and his generals set up quarters in the mansion house of Gödöllő. Here a war council was held where the idea to dethrone the Habsburgs and to fight for Hungarian independence emerged.

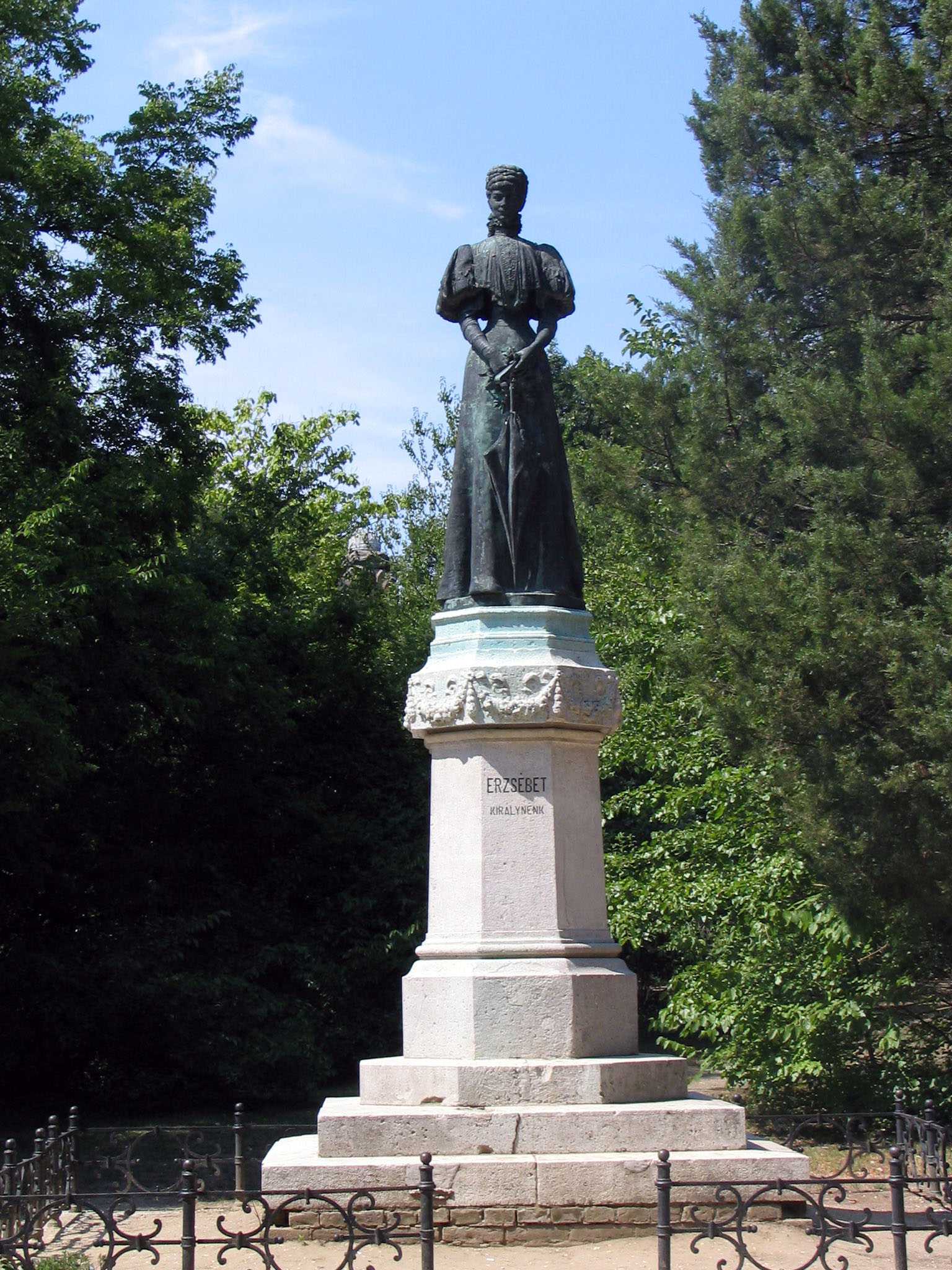
The statue of Empress Elisabeth of Austria in the Erzsébet Park

In 1850, a banker, György Sina, purchased the estate of Gödöllő. He, and later his son, rarely stayed in Gödöllő; they considered the transaction merely a capital investment and in 1864 sold the whole of the property to a Belgian bank. The Hungarian state bought it back from this bank in March 1867 and gave it, together with the mansion house, to Francis Joseph I and Empress Elisabeth of Austria ("Sissi") as a coronation gift. From that time on, the royal family stayed in Gödöllő mainly in spring and autumn, and this resulted in a significant upswing in the life of the town.

The northern railway line, for instance, contrary to the original plan, passes close to Gödöllő because the royal summer resort was there. The gas factory, destined to produce the gas needed for the railway station and the royal mansion house, was accomplished by 1874. The number of artisans and small shopkeepers increased. Many of them were provided with work by the estate and the court. In 1869, the Gödöllő Savings Bank was established, its first shareholder being Francis Joseph I. The country town (that is, from 1864 on, a large village as an administrative division) grew into an increasingly popular summer resort, owing, in addition to the presence of the royal family, to its natural endowments and fresh air. Annually 300–400 families of Pest spent the summer season in Gödöllő, which was growing richer and richer with bathing places, restaurants, and village inns. The "Hotel Queen Elisabeth", established in the Hamvay mansion, became the scene of a teeming social life. The casino was open there and various social clubs and circles often organised their evening parties linked with theatrical performances.

The agrarian character of the village began to take shape at the tum of the century. The legal successors of the agricultural training institutes and model farms established in the territories of the royal demesne are still operating today. Besides, the number of artisans further increased since, partly because the royal summer resort was here; no big industry had settled in Gödöllő: A result of the transport development was the lengthening of the suburban ("HÉV") railway line, originally between Budapest and Kerepes, up to Gödöllő. This line still works well today.

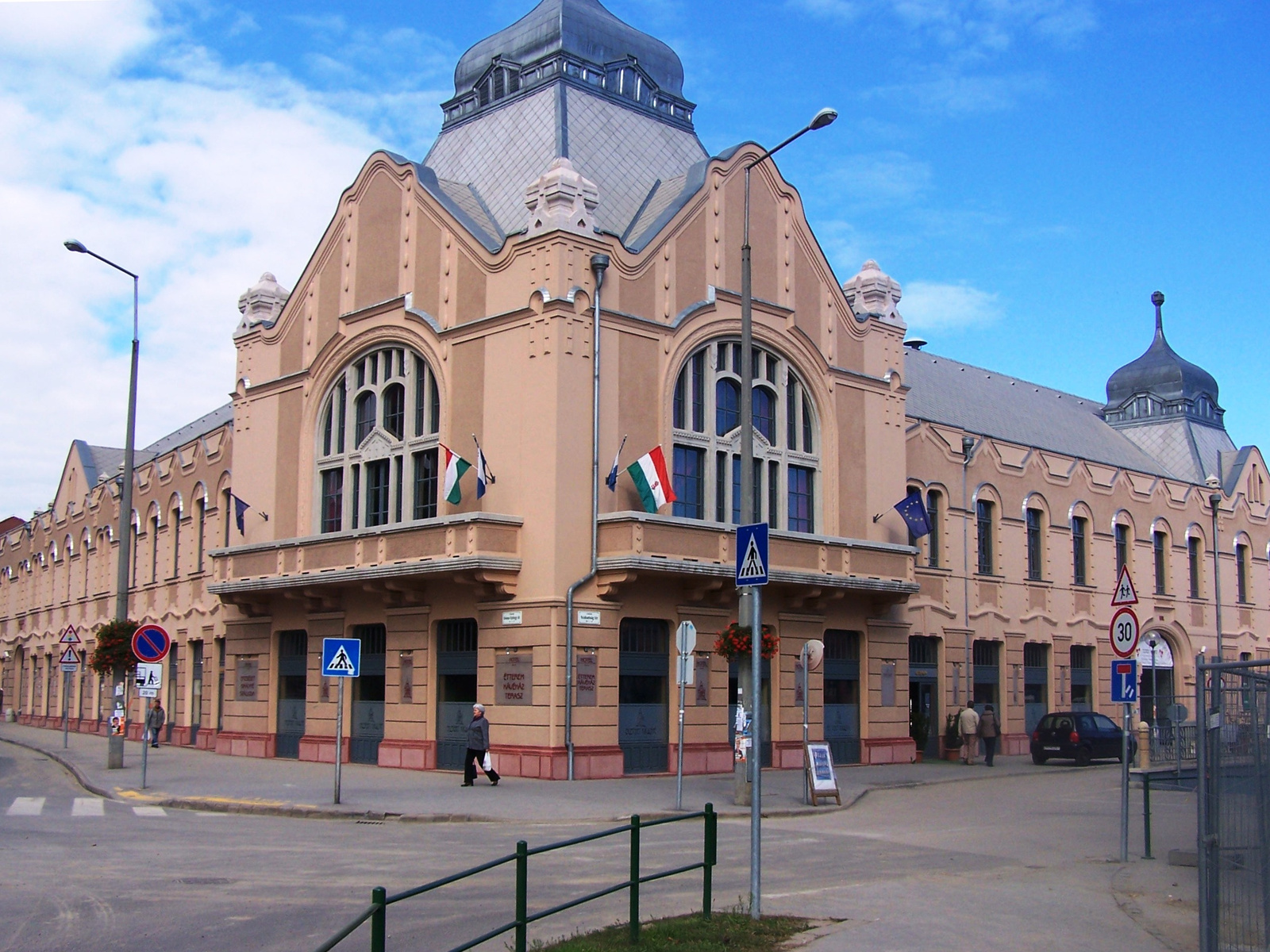
The Old Town Hall, today it is the Hotel Erzsébet Királyné

Gödöllő at the turn of the century also wrote its name into the history book of Hungarian art. From 1901 to 1920, the only organised artists colony of the period of the Hungarian Sezession was working here.

This was the time when secondary school teaching started in the community. The Grammar School of the Minorites opened its gates in 1911. By 1924, the Grammar School of the Premonstratensian Order had also been built.

=== 4th World Scout Jamboree ===
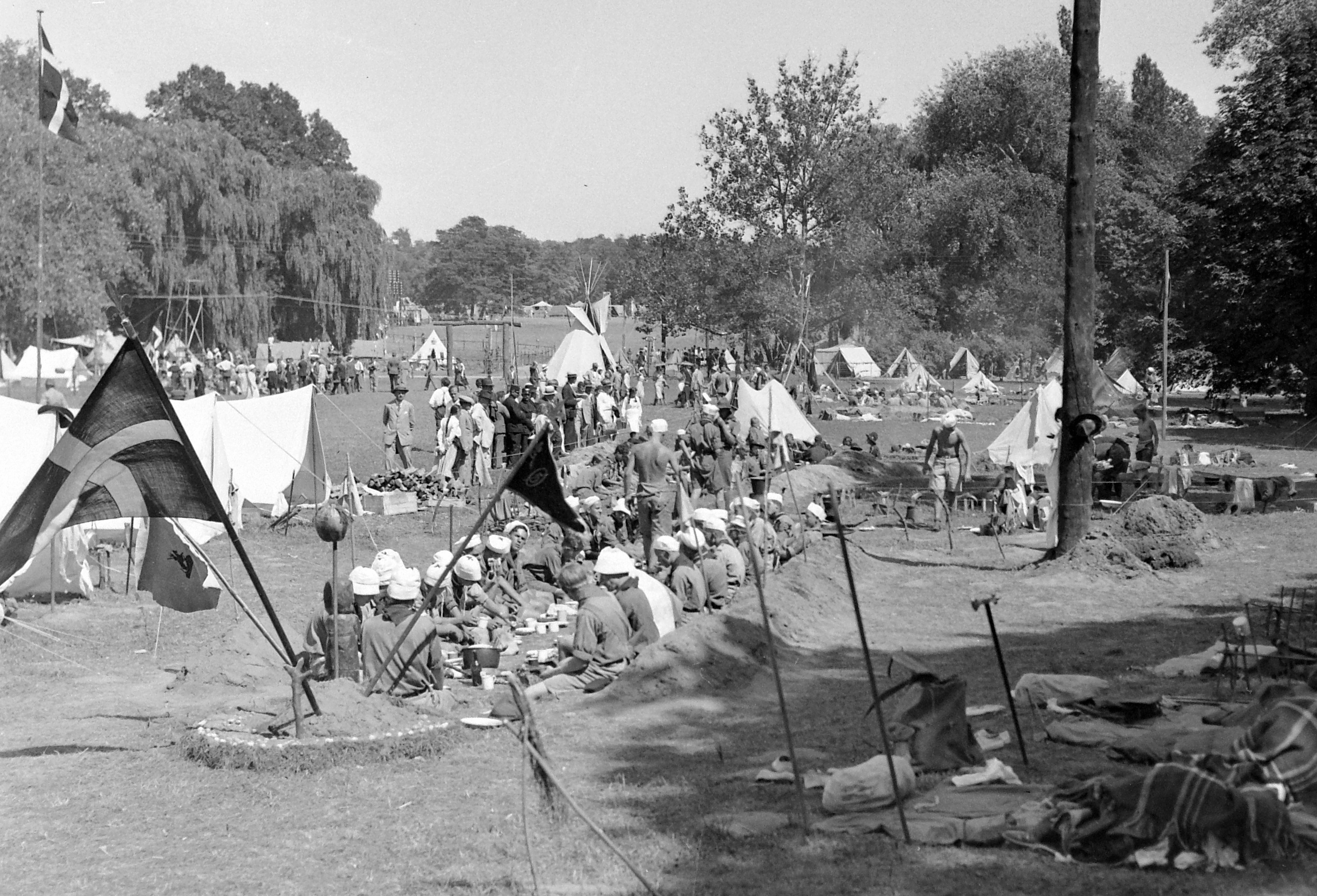
Jamboree scout camps at Royal Forest

Gödöllő in the area around the royal palace hosted the 4th World Scout Jamboree during 2–13 August 1933 at the Royal Forest of Gödöllő. A total of 25,792 scouts from 54 nations camped on the site. The Jamboree Camp Chief was the Chief Scout of Hungary, Count Teleki Pál, a member of the International Committee who had previously been and would later once again become Prime Minister of Hungary. The General Camp Manager was Vitez Kisbarnaki Ferenc Farkas, a general staff officer of the Hungarian Royal Army, who was later appointed the Chief Scout of Hungary on Teleki Pál's death in 1941. The scouts lived in ten sub-camps. The overall encampment was serviced by its own post office, ambulance station, hospital, a steam railway and station, an electric local tram line with four stations, radio service, 14 km (9 mi) water supply with 9 wells, and an air-service.

This event was notable as the first international gathering where Air Scouts were represented, including the famous pilots, Hungarian László Almásy and Austrian Robert Kronfeld. In 1939 the royal park also hosted a jamboree of Girl Scouts.

=== Gödöllő and the Holocaust ===
Gödöllő has records of a Jewish population since the first half of the 19th century, suppliers to the court of Francis Joseph I since 1867. A synagogue was built in 1870, and a Jewish school operated from 1857 to 1944. The Jewish population was 195 in 1880, and 276 in 1930, after reaching a peak of 451 in 1920. After World War I, the Jews were severely persecuted, particularly after László Endre's 1923 appointment as district commissioner of the town.

According to Yad Vashem, there were 188 Jewish people resident in the town in 1941. The area governor, Dr Laszlo Endre, sent many of the Jewish men to Hungarian army for forced labour, where most perished on the Eastern Front in Ukraine. The town ghetto was established at the end of April 1944, before the publication of the decree ordering the establishment of ghettos in the district, which according to Yad Vashem was issued on 12 May 1944 by the deputy commissioner of the district, Dr Laszlo Andre.

The Jewish population of Gödöllő was deported to Auschwitz via a sugar beet factory in Hatvan on 12 June 1944 as part of the so-called "emergency" deportations from Zala County and other parts of southern Hungary, rather than as part of the operations in Zones III and IV. Randolph L. Braham suggests this order came directly from Hungarian government circles, citing allegations that it was "to enable Miklós Horthy to walk around the town without having to see any Jews and to make it possible for him to personally experience the consequences of the anti-Jewish measures." The town was at this time the "summer residence" of Horthy, regent of Hungary.

=== Soviet Era ===
After World War II, the development of the community took a new turn. Soviet troops were stationed in part of the mansion house, while in a larger part there was a social welfare home. In contrast to its earlier character as a summer resort, industry started in Gödöllő. The first step in this direction was the building of the Ganz Factory of Electric Measuring Instruments in 1950, which was followed by other industrial plants. In the same year, the University of Agricultural Sciences moved into the buildings of the closed-down institute of the Premonstratensian. This meant the completion of the community's character as an agrarian centre and resulted in a further expansion of the network of agricultural institutions linked to the university.

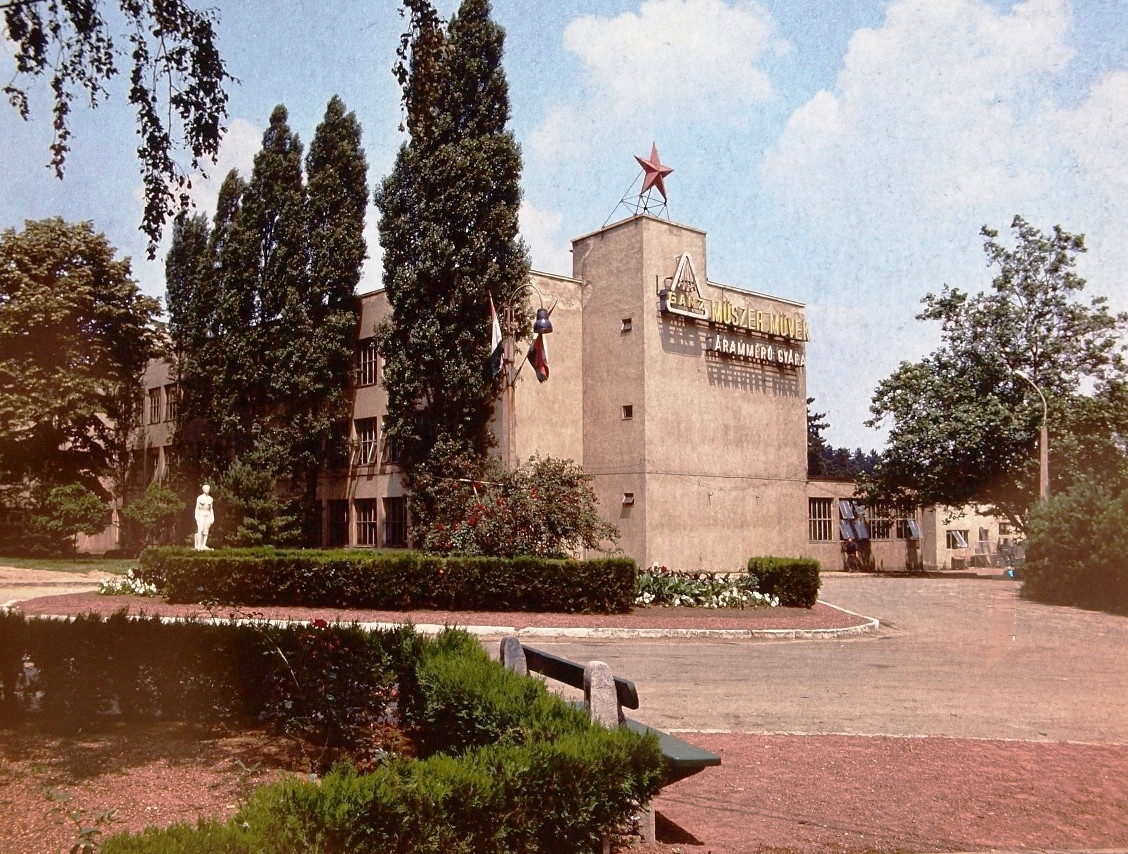
"Ganz" Factory of Electric Measuring Instruments

The role of the ecclesiastical schools nationalised in 1948 was taken over by the general and secondary schools of the state. In 1951, the School of Apprentices started its activities and in 1955, the "Török Ignác" General State Grammar School began its work. The library of the community opened in 1955 and since then it has been extended with departments for children and for music.

On 1 January 1966, Gödöllő was promoted to the rank of a town. The present face of the town began to take shape at that time. The old rows of peasant houses disappeared one after the other, giving place to housing estates and public institutions.

In the cultural life of the town, a new era started in 1981 when the "Sándor Petőfi" Cultural Centre was inaugurated which, with its varied programmes, soon attained nationwide renown. During this decade, the town centre changed a lot. In the main square, a bank and a travel agency were built. Construction of a town hall was completed in 1986 (demolished 2018 to make way for a children's playground and public seating). Opposite this the new building of the grammar school was inaugurated in 1988. It was in this year that Hamvay House, which had held the collection of local history since 1978, received the rank of a museum. At the same time, the collection of mechanical machinery of the Agricultural University was opened.

Political changes which came about at the end of the 1980s and the beginning of the 1990s brought about significant changes in the life of Gödöllő, too. Some of the industrial projects settled here in the 1950s closed, while others which were viable were privatised. The number of industrial and service units in private ownership increased and quickly transformed the appearance of the town.

The influence of the changes also made itself felt in education. The church schools restarted their activities. In 1989, the Capuchins and the Salvator Sisters received back their monasteries; in 1990, the Premonstratensian returned to Gödöllő and, after having opened their school, built their church in 1993.

=== After Communism ===
The signal of the 2011 Hungarian EU Presidency

In 1990, after the departure of the Soviet troops, the process of renovating the almost ruined Grassalkovich mansion house began, and although work continues, the majority of the Royal Palace is open to visitors as a museum and concert venue.

During the 2011 Hungarian EU Presidency, informal international ministerial meetings were held in the Royal Palace.

The town hosted The 10th ASEM Foreign Ministers' Meeting, an interregional forum of the 27 members of the European Union, the European Commission, the 10 members of the ASEAN Secretariat, China, Japan, and the Republic of Korea, India, Mongolia, Pakistan, Australia, Russia, New Zealand, Bangladesh, Norway and Switzerland.

In 2016 (28 July through 6 August), Gödöllő hosted the Men's 2016 European Lacrosse Championships. The championships consisted of 24 European nations. The matches for the tournaments were held on the ground of Szent István University.

== Geography ==
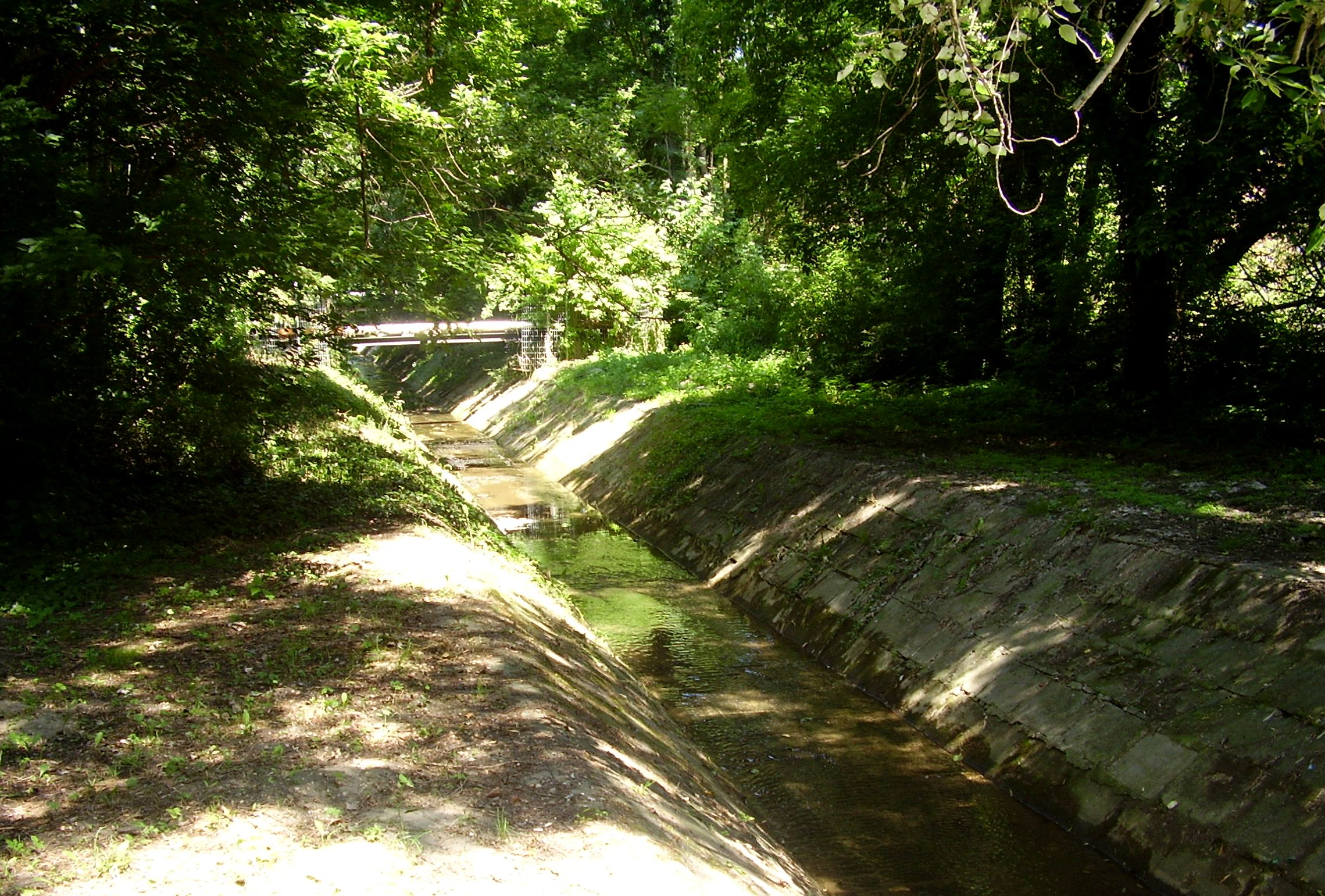
Rákos Brook

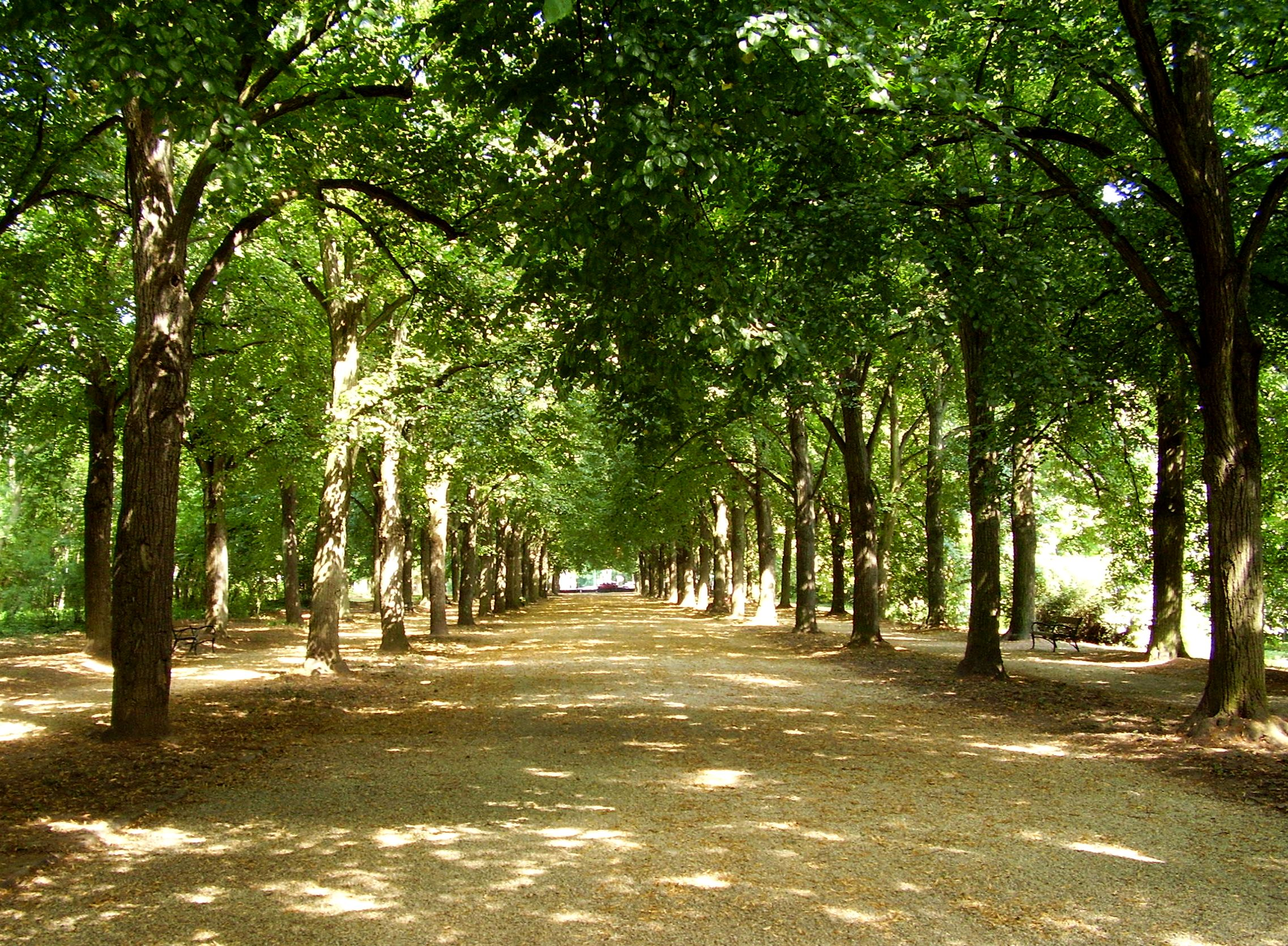
The Elisabeth Park

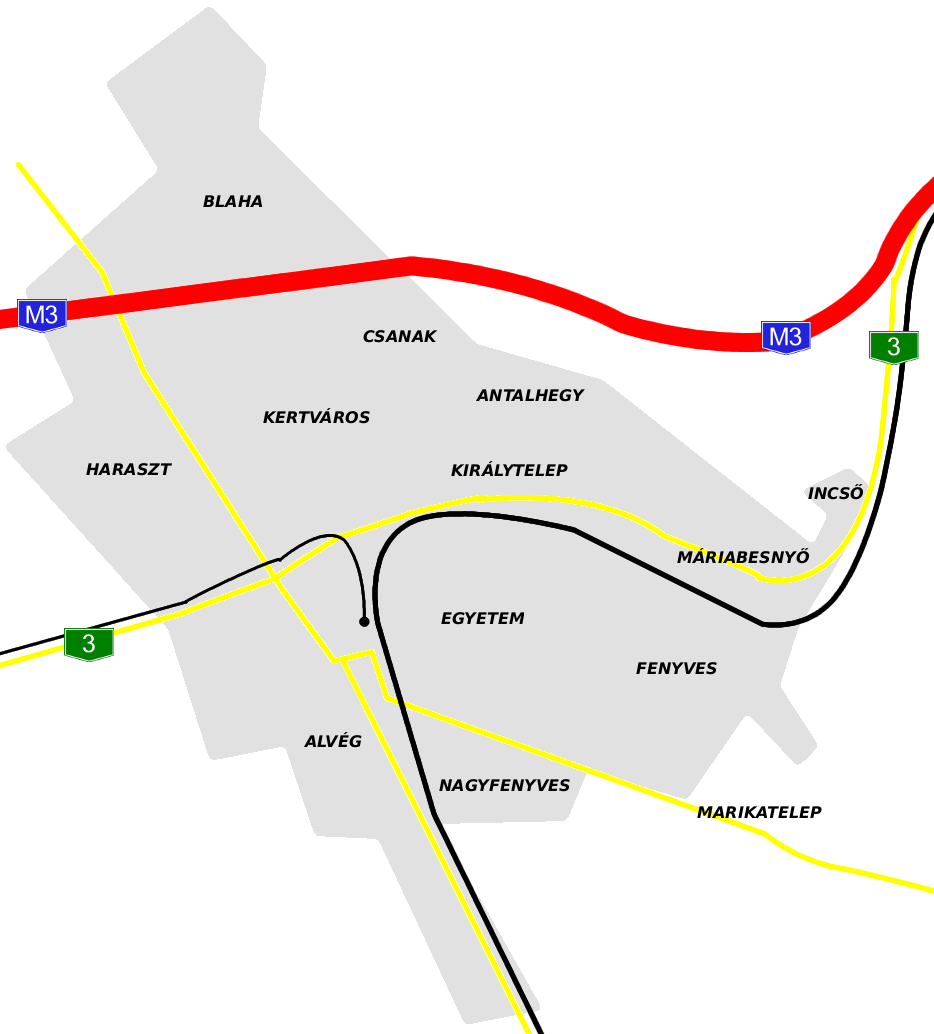
Town parts

Gödöllő is located at 47°36′00″N 19°22′00″E. It lies in the Gödöllő Hill Region.

According to the 2010 census, the town has a total area of 61.98 square kilometres (23.93 sq mi). 58.36 square kilometres (22.53 sq mi) of it is land and 1.4 square kilometres (0.54 sq mi) of it (2.25%) is water.

Gödöllő is bordered on the south by the town of Isaszeg, on the east through the forest by the village of Domony, on the west through the other forest by the town of Kerepes, and on the north by Szada.

The Arboretum of Gödöllő, called Franz Joseph Arboretum in the beginning, was established in 1902 on 190 hectares (470 acres) of land; the installation completed in 1914. Before World War II, it was considered as the most significant arboretum in Hungary. The town began to expand it in 1960, and today operates 350 hectares (860 acres). 90% of the forest is for research purposes and the other 10% is a park.

This area is also home to the town's museum of beekeeping (Méhészeti Múzeum).

=== Parks ===
Compared to the size of the town, it has many parks, but there are only four large ones.

- Erzsébet Park (park of Empress Elisabeth of Austria)
- Kastély Park (park of the palace)
- Alsó Park (downtown park)
- Egyetemi Park (university park)

=== Neighborhoods ===
1. Town Centre
2. Antalhegy
3. Blaha
4. Csanak
5. Haraszt
6. Kertváros
7. Királytelep
8. Máriabesnyő
9. Alvég
10. Fenyves
11. Nagyfenyves
12. Egyetem (University), Fácános
13. Incső
14. Marikatelep

=== Climate ===
The town has a temperate, transitional climate – somewhere between the mild, snowy weather of Transdanubia, the variable continental climate and the almost sub-Mediterranean weather of the south.

Climate data for Gödöllő
Month	Jan	Feb	Mar	Apr	May	Jun	Jul	Aug	Sep	Oct	Nov	Dec	Year
Record high °C (°F)	18.1 (64.6)	19.7 (67.5)	25.4 (77.7)	30.2 (86.4)	34.0 (93.2)	39.5 (103.1)	40.7 (105.3)	39.4 (102.9)	35.2 (95.4)	30.8 (87.4)	22.6 (72.7)	19.3 (66.7)	40.7 (105.3)
Mean daily maximum °C (°F)	1.2 (34.2)	4.5 (40.1)	10.2 (50.4)	16.3 (61.3)	21.4 (70.5)	24.4 (75.9)	26.5 (79.7)	26.0 (78.8)	22.1 (71.8)	16.1 (61.0)	8.1 (46.6)	3.1 (37.6)	15.0 (59.0)
Daily mean °C (°F)	−1.6 (29.1)	1.1 (34.0)	5.6 (42.1)	11.1 (52.0)	15.9 (60.6)	19.0 (66.2)	20.8 (69.4)	20.2 (68.4)	16.4 (61.5)	11.0 (51.8)	4.8 (40.6)	0.4 (32.7)	10.4 (50.7)
Mean daily minimum °C (°F)	−4.0 (24.8)	−1.7 (28.9)	1.7 (35.1)	6.3 (43.3)	10.8 (51.4)	13.9 (57.0)	15.4 (59.7)	14.9 (58.8)	11.5 (52.7)	6.7 (44.1)	2.1 (35.8)	−1.8 (28.8)	6.3 (43.3)
Record low °C (°F)	−25.6 (−14.1)	−23.4 (−10.1)	−15.1 (4.8)	−4.6 (23.7)	−1.6 (29.1)	3.0 (37.4)	5.9 (42.6)	5.0 (41.0)	−3.1 (26.4)	−9.5 (14.9)	−16.4 (2.5)	−20.8 (−5.4)	−25.6 (−14.1)
Average precipitation mm (inches)	38.5 (1.52)	36.7 (1.44)	37.4 (1.47)	47.2 (1.86)	64.5 (2.54)	69.8 (2.75)	50.4 (1.98)	49.5 (1.95)	42.7 (1.68)	46.9 (1.85)	59.9 (2.36)	49.3 (1.94)	592.8 (23.34)
Average precipitation days	7	6	6	6	8	8	7	6	5	5	7	7	78
Mean monthly sunshine hours	55	84	137	182	230	248	274	255	197	156	67	48	1,933
Source: www.met.hu

== Demographics ==
Historical Populations
Year	Pop.	±%
1785	720	—
1900	5,893	+718.5%
1960	17,693	+200.2%
1990	28,195	+59.4%
1995	28,931	+2.6%
2000	30,440	+5.2%
2002	31,263	+2.7%
2004	31,705	+1.4%
2006	32,081	+1.2%
2008	32,907	+2.6%
2010	33,901	+3.0%
2011	34,396	+1.5%

The town's population has grown significantly since the 1990s. Many people move away from the capital city, Budapest, and settle in Gödöllő.

=== Ethnicity ===
The following table shows the ethnic distribution of Gödöllő in the 2001 census.

All	Hungarians	Gypsies	Germans	Slovaks	Ukrainians	Poles	Romanians	Others
100%	94.4%	1.1%	0.6%	0.4%	0.1%	0.05%	0.04%	3.31%

In the town Gypsy, Greek, Polish, German and Ruthenian minority formed government.

=== Religion ===
The following table shows the religious distribution of Gödöllő in the 2001 census.

All	Roman Catholics	Atheists	Calvinists	Lutherans	Greek Catholics	Others	Unknown
100%	52.0%	15.3%	14.8%	3.1%	1.2%	1.5%	12.1%

== Politics ==
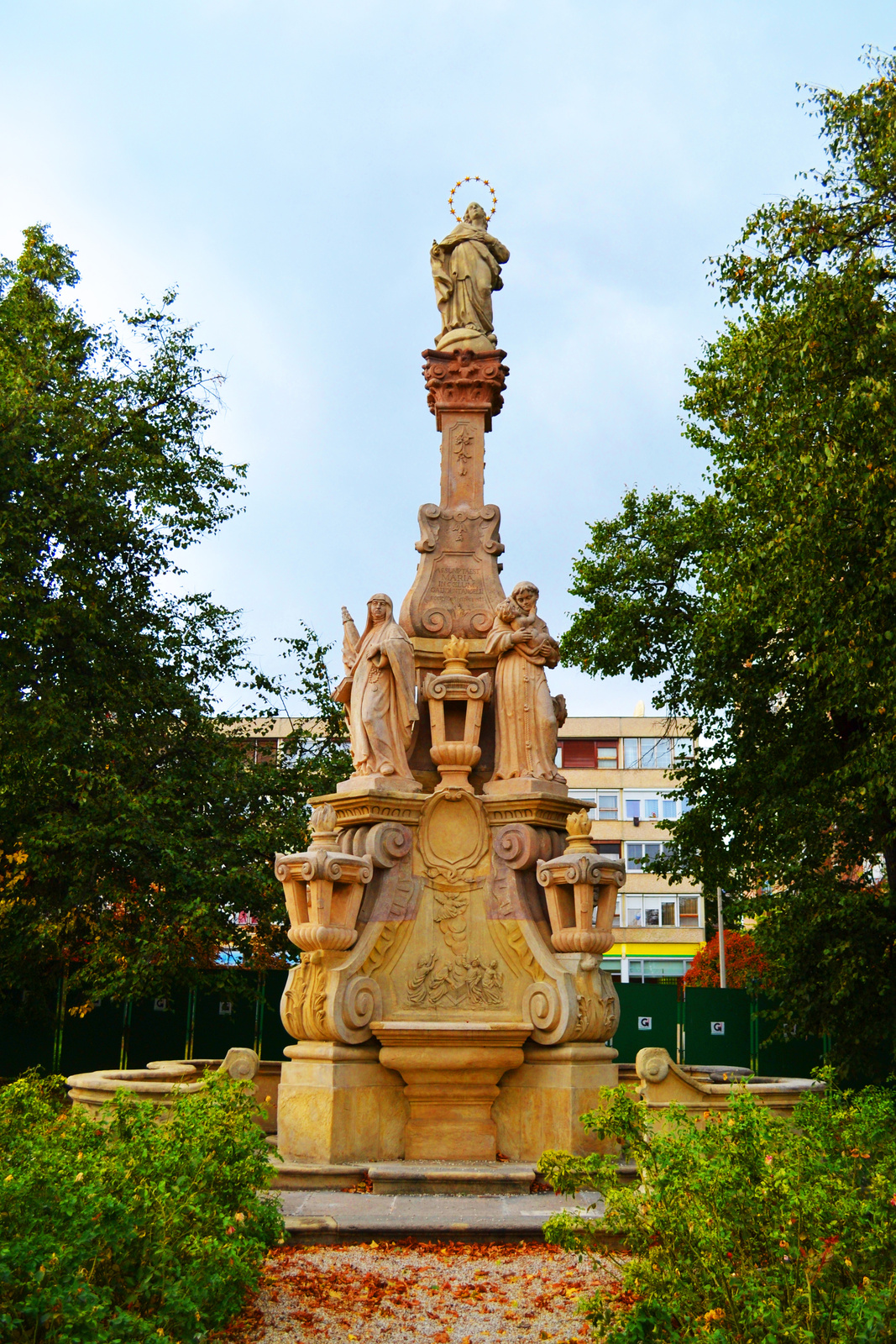
Maria-statue on the Szabadság Square

Between 1990 and 2010, representatives were elected from 14 constituencies into the representative body, and another 9 people got in from a compensation list, which consisted of a total 23 people. The amended legislation in 2010 reduced the number of constituencies to 10, the number of obtainable seats from the compensation list to 4, so the new council contains 14 people.

The mayor has two deputies, who are elected from the representatives.

The town has established several business organizations which are providing public services, such as district heating networks, the town market, and the House of Arts, furthermore the public catering, waste management and general urban management tasks.

=== Mayors and council presidents ===
- György Gémesi (1990–)
- István Papp (1983–1990)
- György Ritecz (1982–1983)
- János Benedek (1971–1982)
- Tibor Galicz (1967–1971)
- József Gyetvai (1966–1967)

== Economy ==
The Hungarian chemical company BorsodChem established in 2008 a technical support and R&D centre in Gödöllő. The British pharmaceutical company GlaxoSmithKline has been operating its vaccine plant in the town since 2006. The American technology company, Itron has its own R&D centre there since 2017. The Hungarian flavour and essential oils manufacturer FOOD BASE, the Hungarian chemical company Chemico, the Italian blood plasma distributor Kedrion, the American cosmetics company Avon and the American vehicle manufacturer Caterpillar Inc. have production facilities in Gödöllő.

== Transport ==
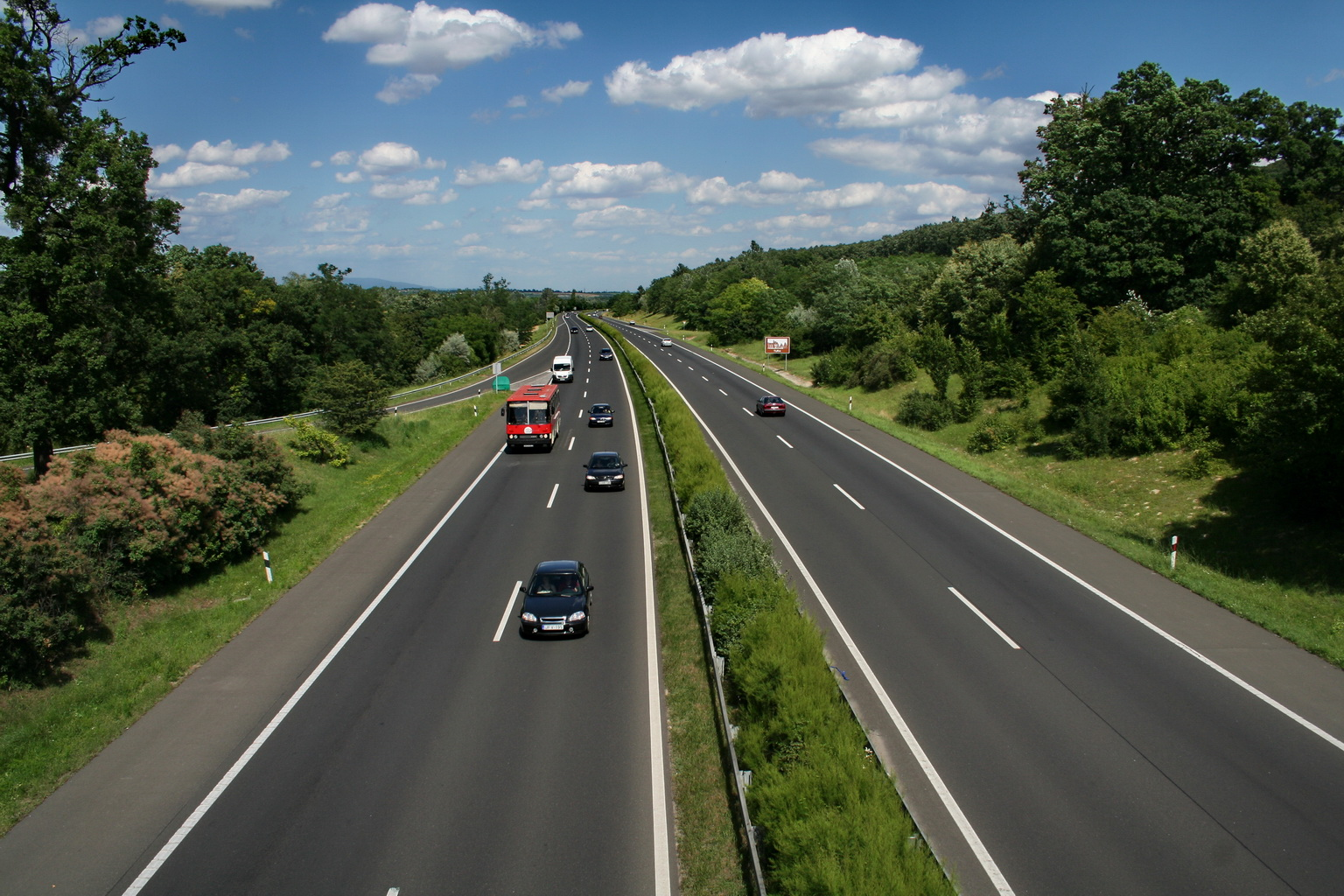
The M3 motorway near Gödöllő

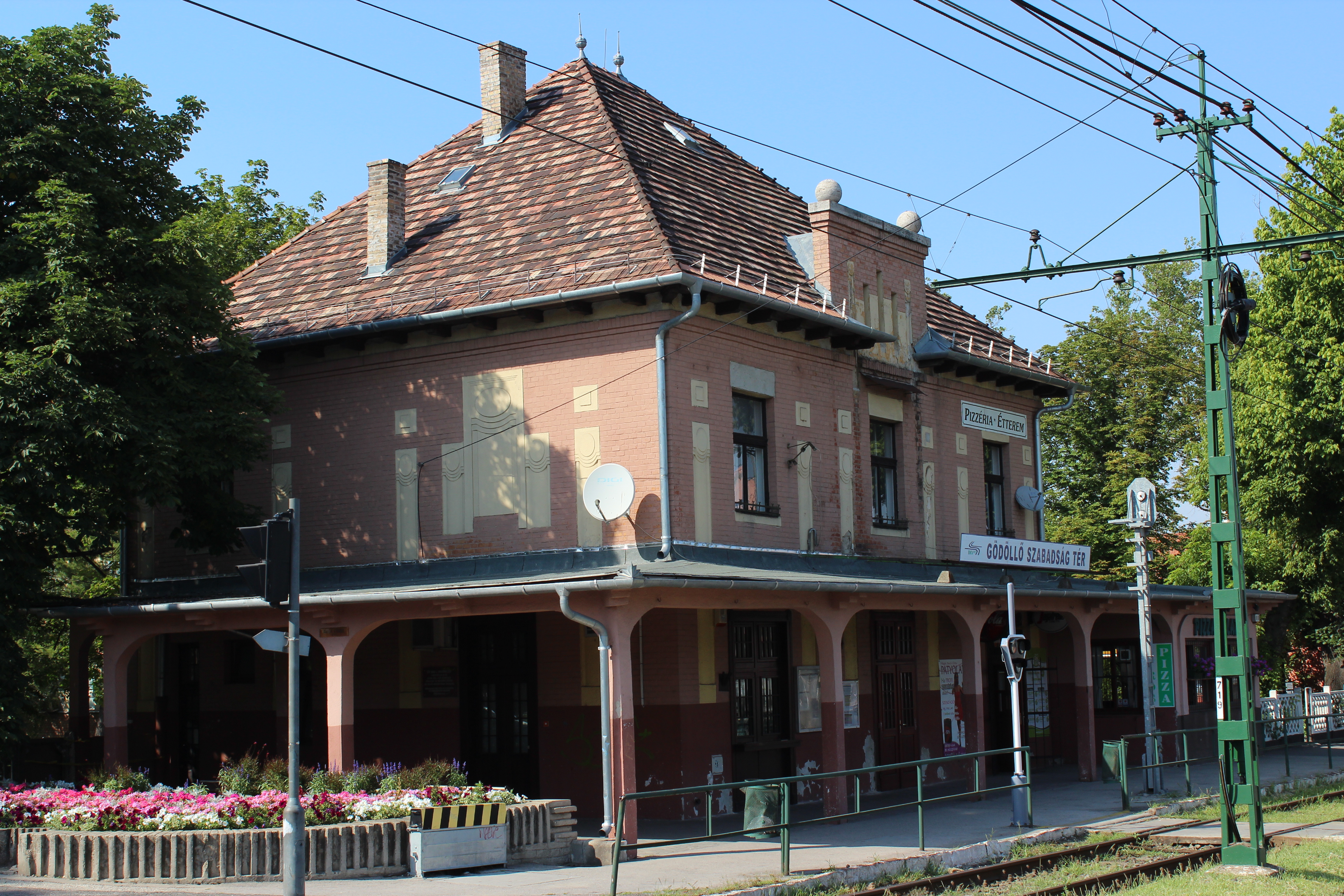
Old HÉV station on the main square

Gödöllő is a transportation hub, because of the 3 main road and the M3 motorway cuts through the town, and the M31 motorway connects them with the eastern section of the M0 ring road. In addition, there are minor roads running from the town to Vác, Pécel and Jászberény.

The Budapest-Sátoraljaújhely-rail line is also affected, as well as the BKV H8, suburban train terminal is located here.

Gödöllő has nine local bus lines and is a common stop for long-distance buses.

In August 2025, Gödöllő was announced as the first European location to pilot AI-powered demand-responsive minibuses developed in South Korea. The project, launched jointly by Korean and Hungarian transport authorities, involves a fleet of Hyundai vehicles equipped with artificial intelligence to dynamically adjust routes based on real-time passenger demand. Operating on a demand-responsive transport (DRT) model, the service aims to improve local mobility by allowing users to request pickups via smartphone app or telephone.

=== Motorways ===
- M3
- M31

=== Railways ===
- Budapest-Hatvan railway line
- The suburban railway of Gödöllő (HÉV)

=== Airport ===
Gödöllő has a small sport airport.

== Sights ==
=== Royal Palace of Gödöllő ===
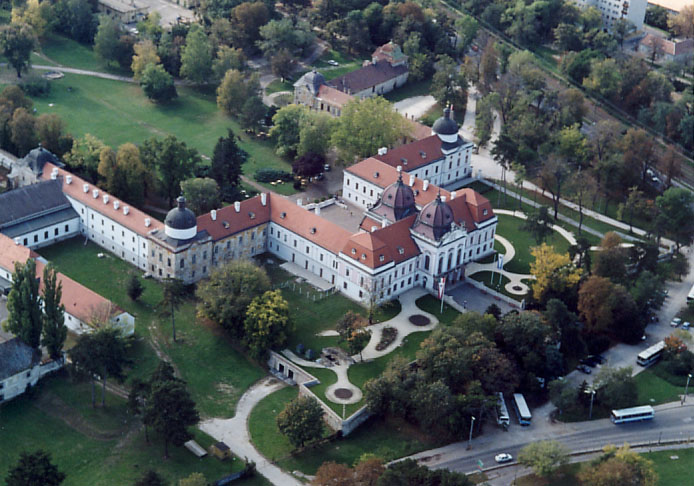
The palace from bird's-eye view

The Royal Palace of Gödöllő is one of the most important, largest monuments of Hungarian palace architecture. it is a Baroque building on the area of 1,700 m^{2} with a park of 28 ha. It is famous for being a favourite place of Queen Elisabeth of Hungary.

=== Main square ===
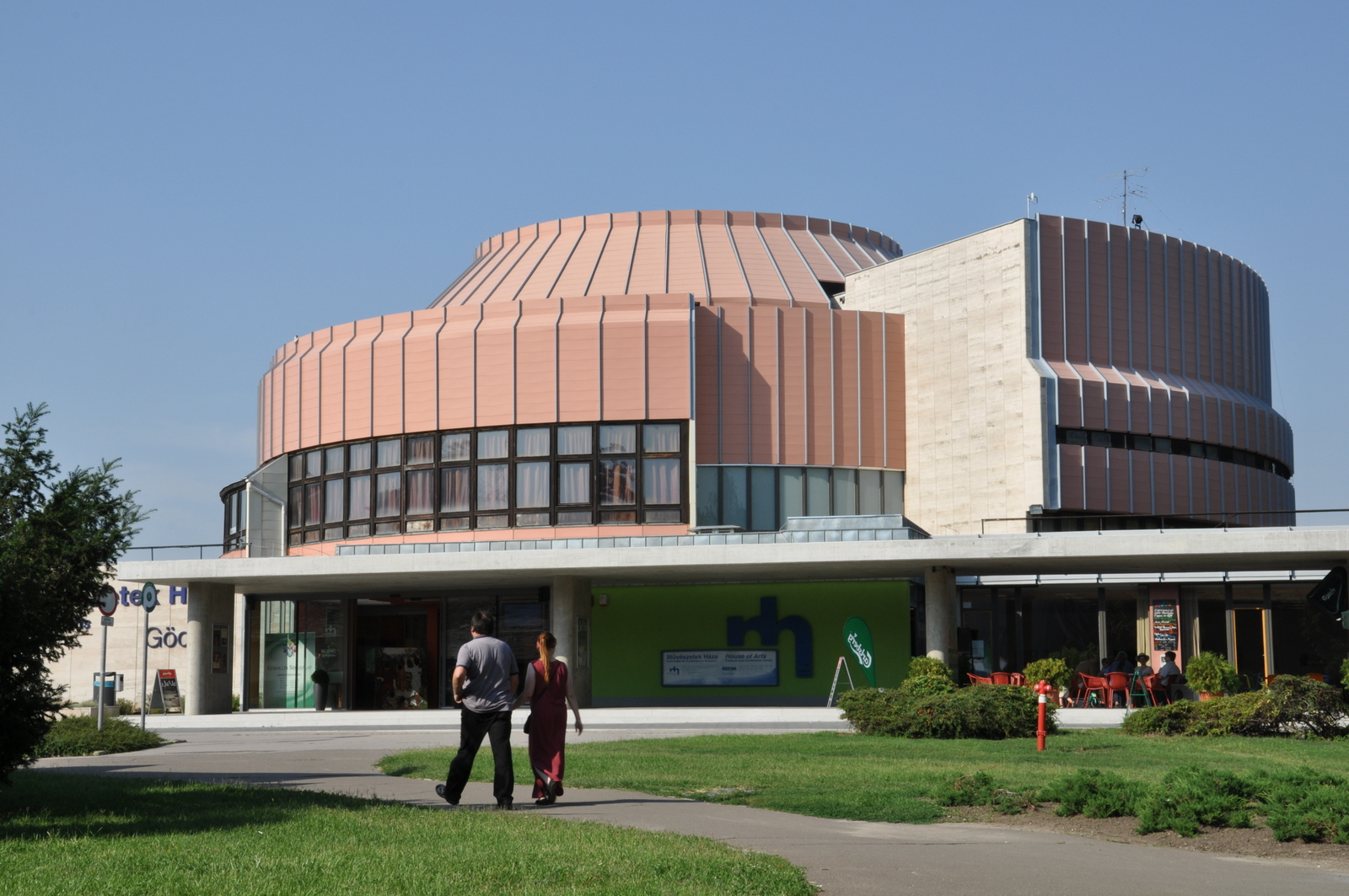
The House of Arts

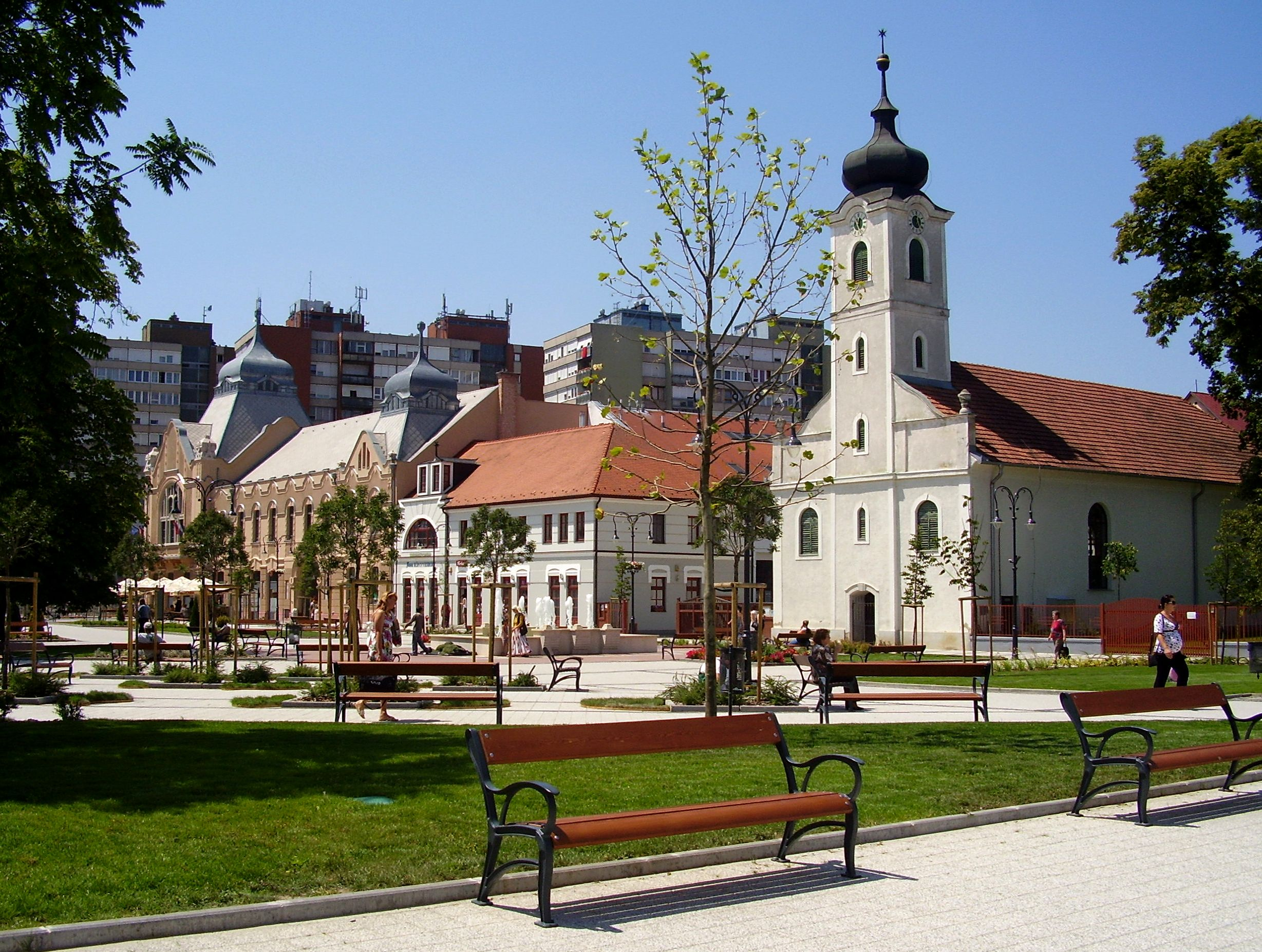
Main square

Gödöllő's main square, Szabadság Tér (Liberty Square), is reached with a short walk from the suburban train (HEV) stop of the same name. Its sights are: right from Dózsa György Road: the Queen Elizabeth Hotel, Reformed Church (9 Szabadság Square), town hall (7 Szabadság Square), the World Peace Gong (right side of the town hall), Hamvay Mansion (5 Szabadság Square), Gödöllő Town Museum (5 Szabadság Square), town market and the Pelican Well (5 Szabadság Square).

As a part of the New Hungary Development Plan, the town's main square has been completely renovated, with work completed in 2011, in an attempt to restore the atmosphere of the town to that of the time prior to the Socialist Party's building programme, which demolished much of the town centre to make way for blocks of flats. As part of the renovation, the square has been pedestrianised, 46 Secession era-style street lights added, and a singing fountain built in front of the Reformed Church.

=== Reformed Church ===
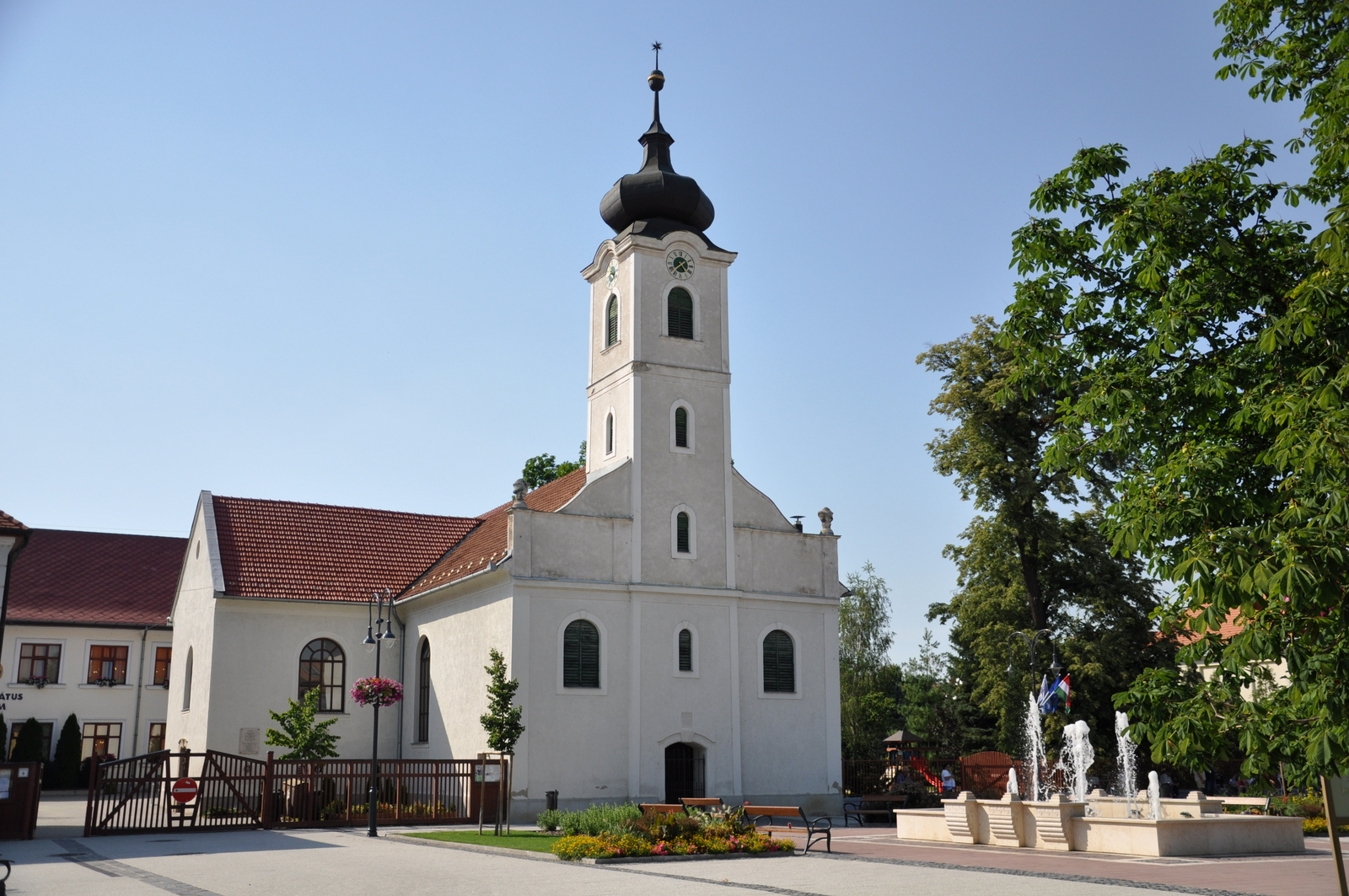
Reformed Church

The baroque-style Reformed Church, built in 1745, is an onion dome church with a beautifully simple façade. The building process was patronized; the money and the plot for the church were donated by Antal Grassalkovich I who had demolished a Reformed Church built in 1657 at the site of the present Royal Castle. The new church was consecrated in 1745. It was renovated several times: in 1912, the complete painted and carved wooden ceiling and the chancel were changed into concrete. The prang in 1945 affected the church seriously and the renovation processes took very long. The renovation of the tower was finished in 1993.

=== World Peace Gong ===
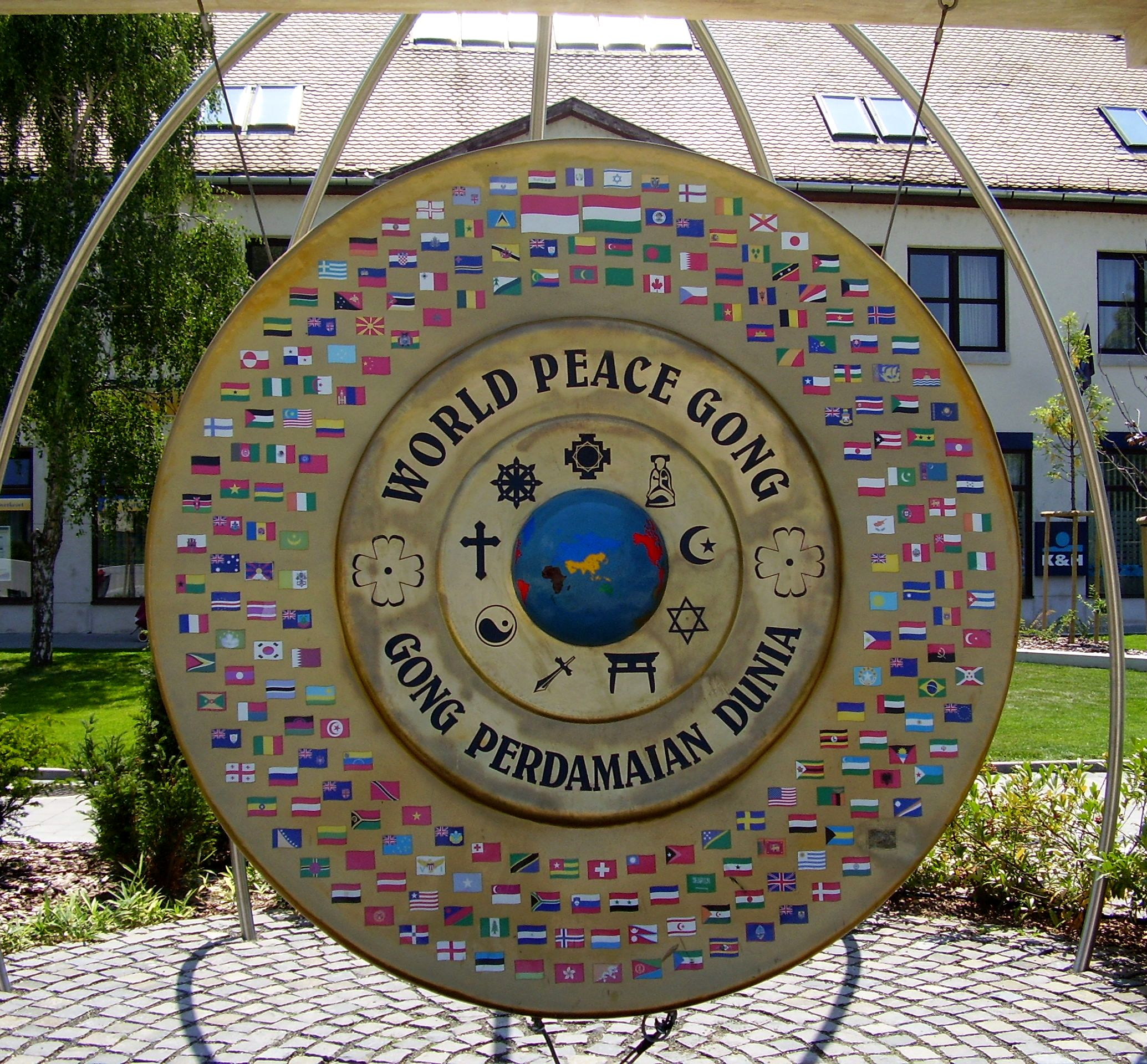
World Peace Gong

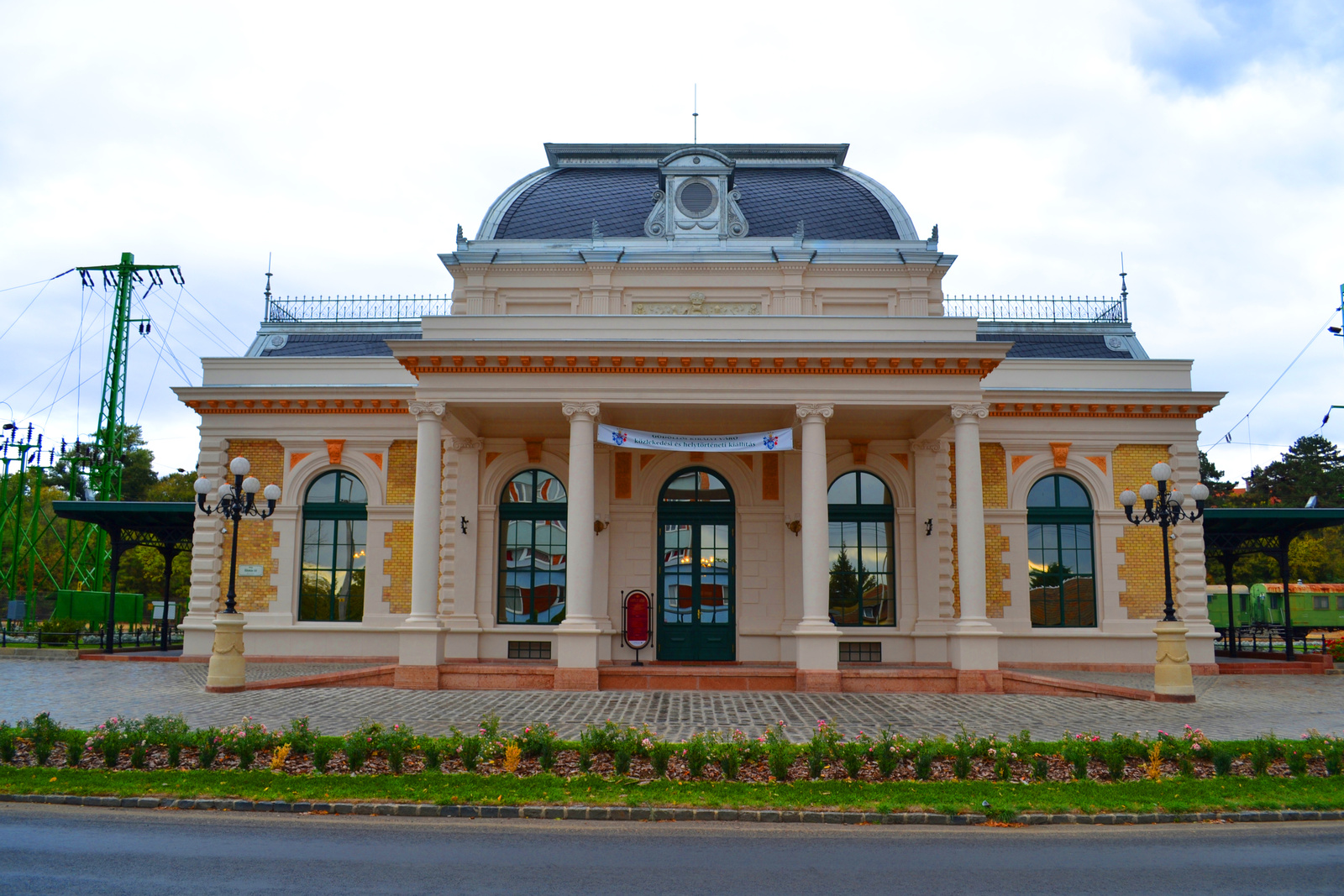
Royal waiting room

The World Peace Gong on the Szabadság (Liberty) Square is the fifth in the world and the first and only European peace gong which was given by Indonesia as a present and a symbol of worldwide friendship and fraternity to the town of Gödöllő. The gong shows the flags of all the countries, the symbols of all the religions and the maps of the oceans of the Earth. It was created by the World Peace Committee as a memento for the bomb attack in Bali in 2002. The gong was offered to Gödöllő in 2007 as an acknowledgement of advances in civilization, technology and economy as well as the peaceful social circumstances in Gödöllő. The gong weighs 150 kg; it is a 2m diameter bronze circle relic, the work of Djuyoto Suntani, an Indonesian sculptor. The gong was inaugurated on 2 May 2007. The story of the gong is engraved in the small plaque in front and the park around it is populated with shrub species typically found in the Tropics. The gong remains in excellent condition, apart from the scratching out, prior to 2009, of the Israeli flag.

=== Hamvay Mansion ===
The mansion, a one-story characteristic baroque building in the town centre, recalls Gödöllő's baroque era with its typical yellow color, wrought-iron lamps. Ferenc Hamvay, landed lord of Gödöllő, built this mansion (a ground level building at the time) in 1662.

In the 18th century, it was rebuilt and became a one-storey building when Antal Grassalkovich I made it a guest house. Then it fulfilled a number of functions, including Gödöllő's first pharmacy in 1814. Some of the ceiling decorations in the interiors of the ground floor are probably left from that time. In the 19th century, it became the hotel bearing the name of Queen Elizabeth of Hungary. From this time on, the hotel was the venue for numerous cultural and artistic events like theatre performances, and it hosted a casino and a number of balls in its ballroom. The Commemorative Room arranged in 1927 in the school operating in the building until 1988 is home to a collection of souvenirs of Gödöllő's history and cultural life. In 1978, another collection on local history was exhibited, the successor of which came to be the Town Museum Gödöllő. The Hamvay Mansion and the market in its garden were renovated in 1998–99; the works were awarded numerous national and international prizes.

=== Town market ===
The modern town market is a lively place. Open on weekday mornings through the early afternoon, it includes outdoor and indoor stands selling fresh produce, flowers, and local craft work, with some stall holders wearing traditional dress. The market has several cafes and a bar.

=== The Pelican Well ===
At the main entrance to the town market stands the Pelican Well; it includes a design featuring a pelican feeding its young with its own blood.

== Education ==
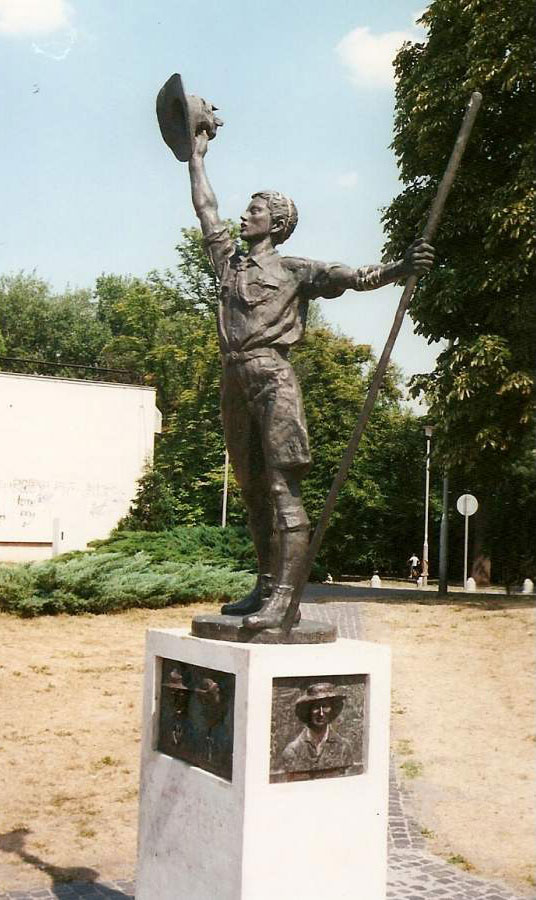
The Boy Scout, a statue erected to commemorate the tenth anniversary of the 1933 World Jamboree

=== Nurseries ===
- 1st Nursery (Palotakert)
- 2nd Nursery (Kossuth Lajos Street)
- 3rd Nursery (Premontrei Road)

=== Kindergartens ===
Municipal kindergartens

- Martinovics utcai Óvoda
- Szent János utcai Óvoda
- Kazinczy körúti Óvoda
- Palotakerti Óvoda
- Tisza utcai Óvoda
- Táncsics Mihály úti Óvoda
- Egyetem téri Óvoda
- Zöld Óvoda

Privately run kindergartens

- Játékkuckó Magánóvoda
- Gödöllő Szabad Waldorf Óvoda
- Stefi Néni Óvodája
- Tudásfa Tanoda Alapítványi Óvoda
- Mókus Odú Gyermekóvoda

=== Elementary schools ===
Municipal schools

- Erkel Ferenc Elementary School
- Hajós Alfréd Elementary School
- Damjanich János Elementary School
- Petőfi Sándor Elementary School
- Montágh Imre Elementary School, Special Vocational School and Vocational School of Advanced Skills

Church and public elementary schools

- Szent Imre Catholic Elementary School
- Gödöllői Waldorf Elementary School and Secondary Grammar School and Primary Art School

=== Secondary schools ===
Municipal secondary schools

- Török Ignác Secondary Grammar School
- Madách Imre Secondary School, Vocational School and College

Church and public secondary schools

- Gödöllői Premontrei Szent Norbert Secondary Grammar School and Church Music Secondary School and College
- Gödöllői Református Líceum Secondary Grammar School and College
- Gödöllői Waldorf Elementary School and Secondary Grammar School and Primary Art School

=== Other educational institutions ===
- Frédéric Chopin Music School
- Summer Day
- Educational Advisory
- Institute for School and Speech Therapy
- Single Teaching Field Service

=== Szent István University ===
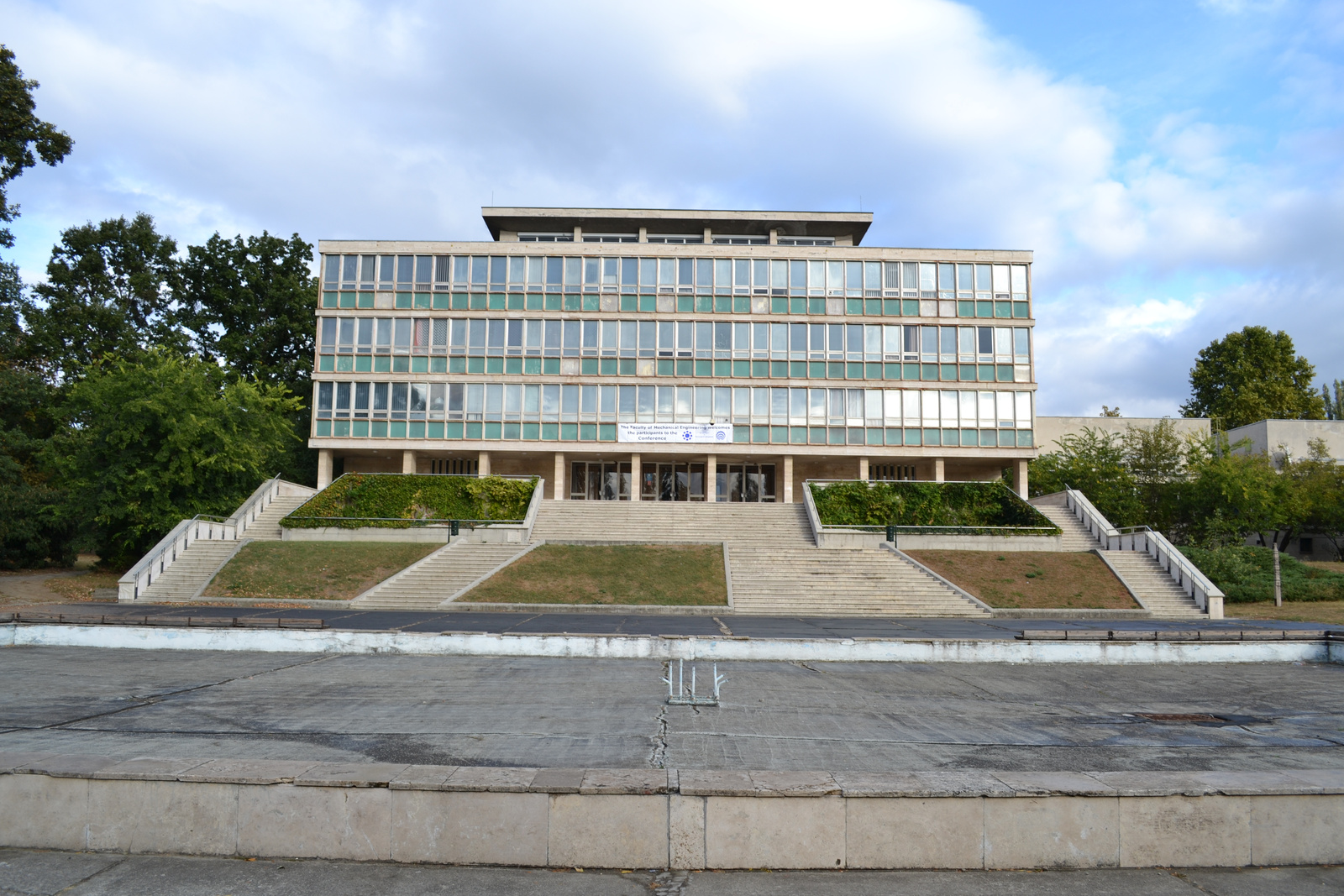
The main building of the university's faculty of Mechanical Engineering

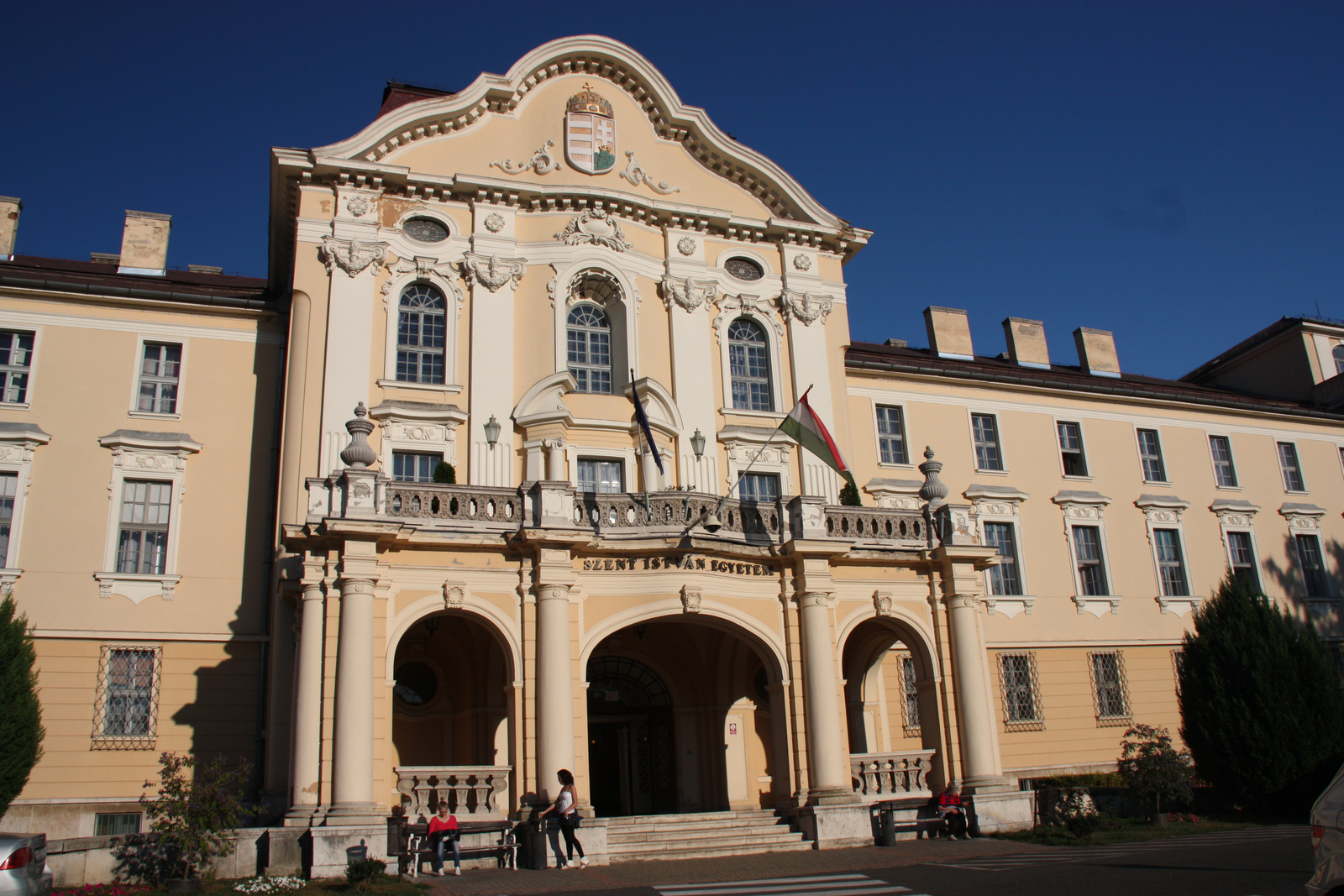
The main entrance of the university

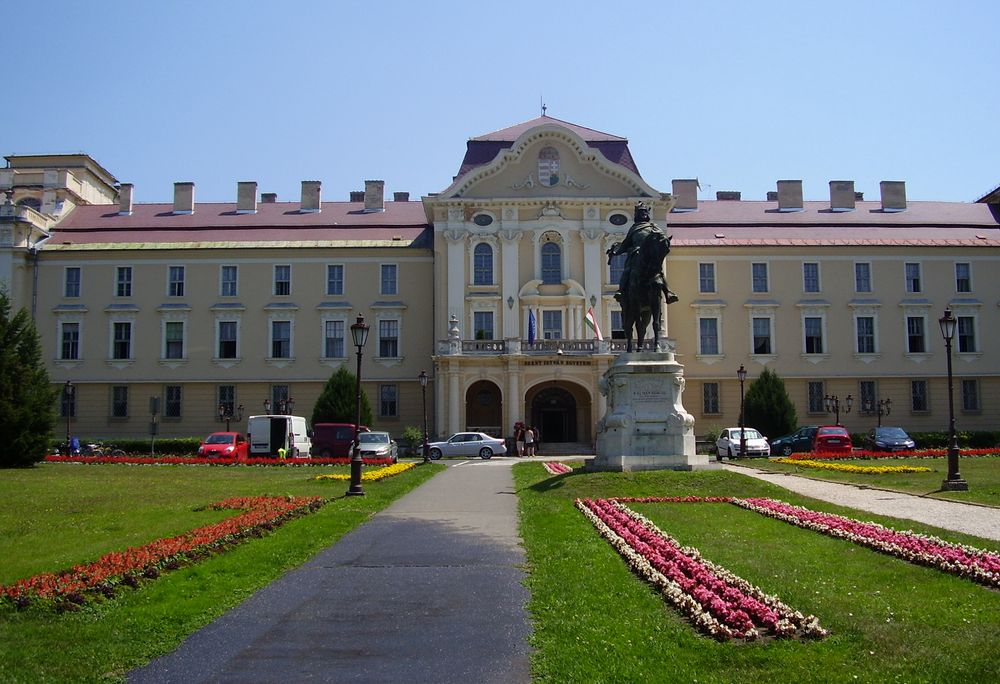
The university

The university headquarters are located in the picturesque Gödöllő, but altogether nine faculties and an institution accept students in Budapest, Jászberény, Békéscsaba, Szarvas, and Gyula. Most of the schools in Szent István University have one or even two-century long histories. SZIU is Hungary's largest agricultural higher educational institution.

More than 18,000 students study in the seven campuses of the university. In addition to conventional agricultural and environmental sciences, Szent István University offers courses in veterinary medicine, environmental sciences, mechanical engineering, economy and social sciences, architecture, water supply management, medical sciences, and applied arts.

==== Amerigo Tot's "The Apotheosis of the Nucleus" ====
Amerigo Tot is a sculptor of Hungarian origin. His copper relief created on an imposing 120 square metres entitled "The Apotheosis of the Nucleus" can be seen in the University Hall of the Faculty of Technical Studies. "I wanted to show the apotheosis of the nucleus in copper...The nucleus, he said, is a general thought. It is the grain for the plant and the beginning for biology as well.' Theoretically grain and soil and woman go together..." said Tot about the theoretical background of the relief. His work was originally designed for the gate of Saint Peter's Basilica in Rome. The first design was ready in 1970 but, due to a series of historical events it was only inaugurated in 1983 in the presence of the artist, who was by then seriously ill.

==== Museum of Agricultural Machinery ====
The museum hosts the second-largest collection of agricultural machinery in the world. It is home to a collection of more than 2,000 agricultural machines that are still working. Six exhibitions introduce agricultural machinery and the history of agricultural techniques. The exhibitions show the development of the machines from very early times like wind, water and steam-powered agricultural machines, to modern ones used today.

Hungaricums (traditional Hungarian food types) are on display here: more than 300 types of food introduce the traditional food of Hungarians arranged in a thematic order according to region. The complete history of Hungarian agricultural production is explained in an exhibition in which the visitor can see soil cultivating machines, plant cultivating machines and those for animal husbandry used by ploughmen in earlier times, as well as modern machines used today.

== Twin towns – sister cities ==
Gödöllő is twinned with:

- Giessen, Germany (1988)
- Forssa, Finland (1990)
- Miercurea Ciuc, Romania (1990)
- Wageningen, Netherlands (1992)
- Dunajská Streda, Slovakia (1994)
- Senta, Serbia (1994)
- Laxenburg, Austria (1997)
- Turnhout, Belgium (1999)
- Żywiec, Poland (2002)
- Aichach, Germany (2006)
- Valdemoro, Spain (2008)
- Brandýs nad Labem-Stará Boleslav, Czech Republic (2009)
- Bogor, Indonesia (2009)
- Bad Ischl, Austria (2012)
- Zhangzhou, China (2013)
- Beit Aryeh-Ofarim, Israel (2015)
- Edirne, Turkey (2016)
- Fauske, Norway (2022)
- Incheon, South Korea (2023)
- Đurđevac, Croatia (2024)
- Haiphong, Vietnam (2024)
- Lubbock, United States of America (2026)

== Notable people ==
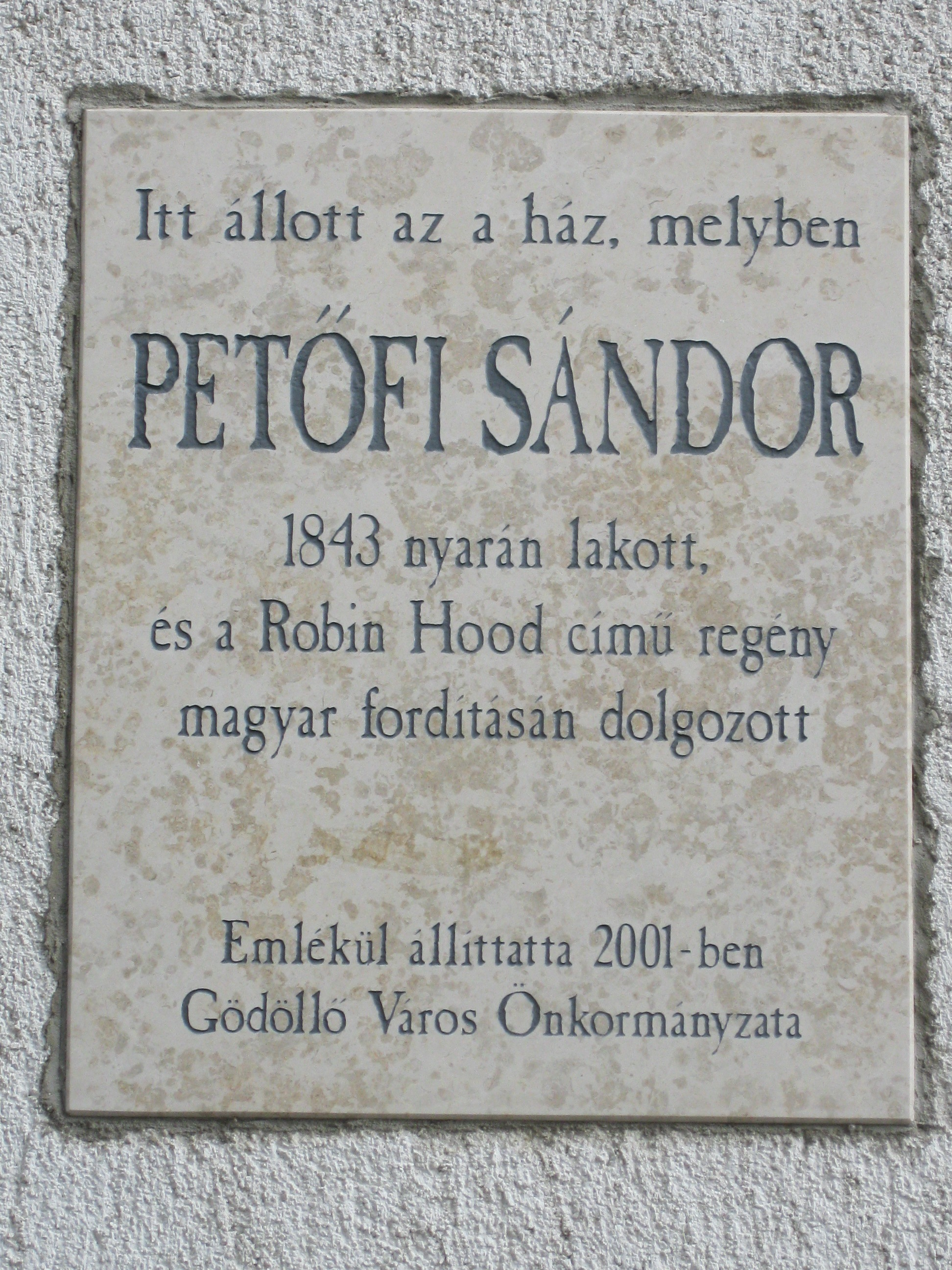
Plaque for Sándor Petőfi

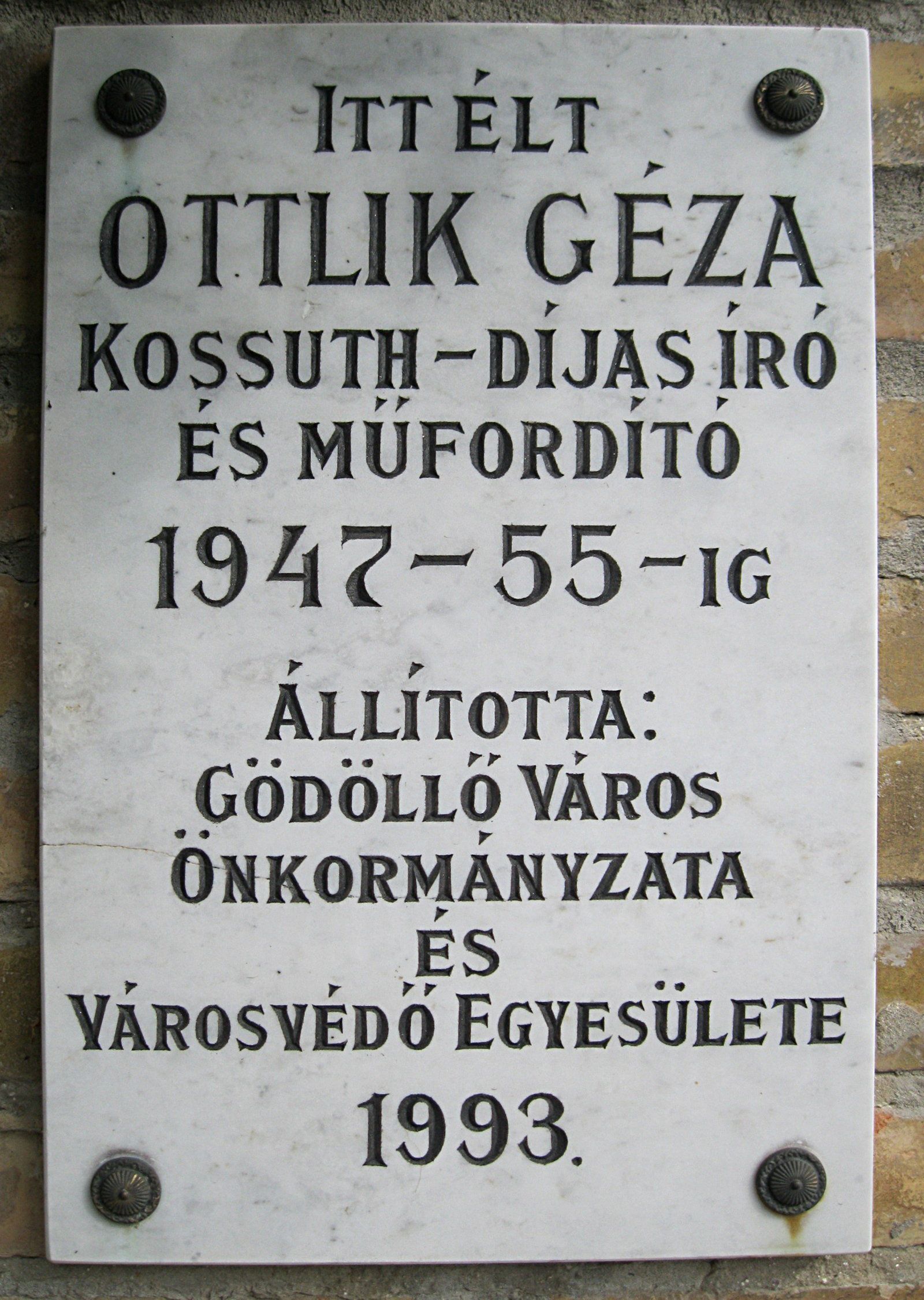
Plaque for Géza Ottlik

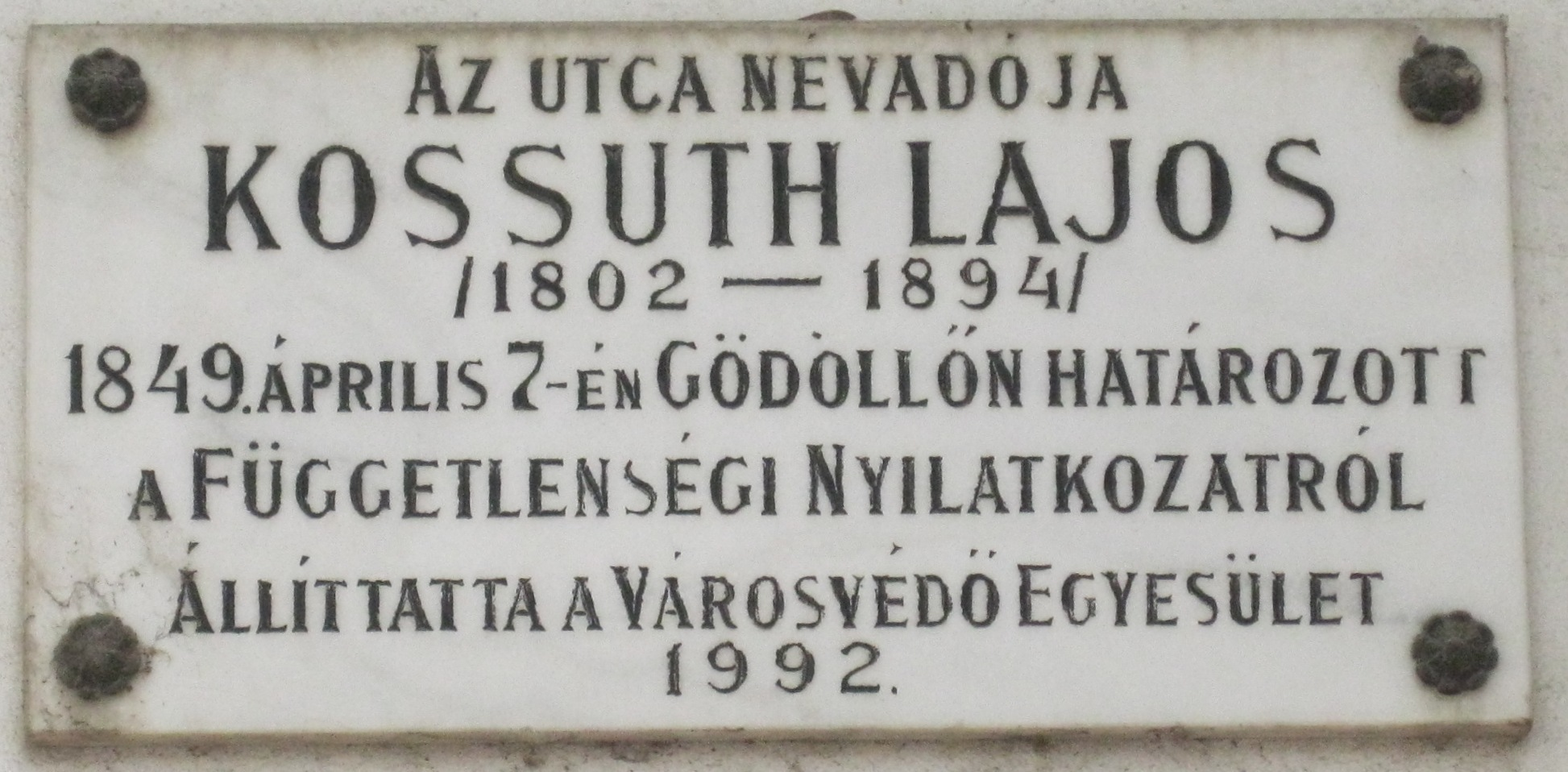
Plaque for Lajos Kossuth in the Kossuth street

- József Ángyán, professor, agricultural engineer and politician
- Miklós Baranyai, physician and politician, member of the National Assembly (MP)
- Behnam Lotfi, musician, member of Compact Disco
- József Dzurják, football player and manager
- Elisabeth of Austria, empress
- Franz Joseph I of Austria, emperor and monarch
- Károly Grósz, communist politician, Prime Minister of Hungary (1987–1988)
- Noémi Kiss, writer
- István Medgyaszay, architect and writer
- Dénes Mihály, inventor and engineer
- Kornél Mundruczó, actor and film director
- Dániel Nagy, footballer
- Gyula J. Obádovics, mathematician
- Géza Ottlik, writer, translator, mathematician and theorist
- Sándor Petőfi, poet and liberal revolutionary (lived in Gödöllő for the summer of 1843)
- Tibor Rab, footballer
- Vilmos Szabadi, violinist
- Ignác Török, honvéd general in the Hungarian army, one of the 13 Martyrs of Arad
- Krisztina Tóth, table tennis player
- Péter Tusor, university associate history professor
- Victor Vashi, political cartoonist
- Theodore Wolfner, deputy in the Austro-Hungarian Monarch
- Zita of Bourbon-Parma, princess
- János Zováth, footballer

== In cinema ==
- Parts of the 1999 British-American film Au Pair take place in Gödöllő.
- In 1900, Aleksandar Lifka shot the visit of the Emperor Franz Joseph and Queen Elisabeth to the town of Gödöllő.
- Several scenes were shot at the Gödöllő Railway Station in the Citizen X (1995).
- Mata Hari, American-Hungarian film (1985)

== Media ==
- Rádióaktiv 93.6
- Gödöllői Szolgálat (weekly)
- Gödöllői Hírek (appears every two weeks)

== Gallery ==
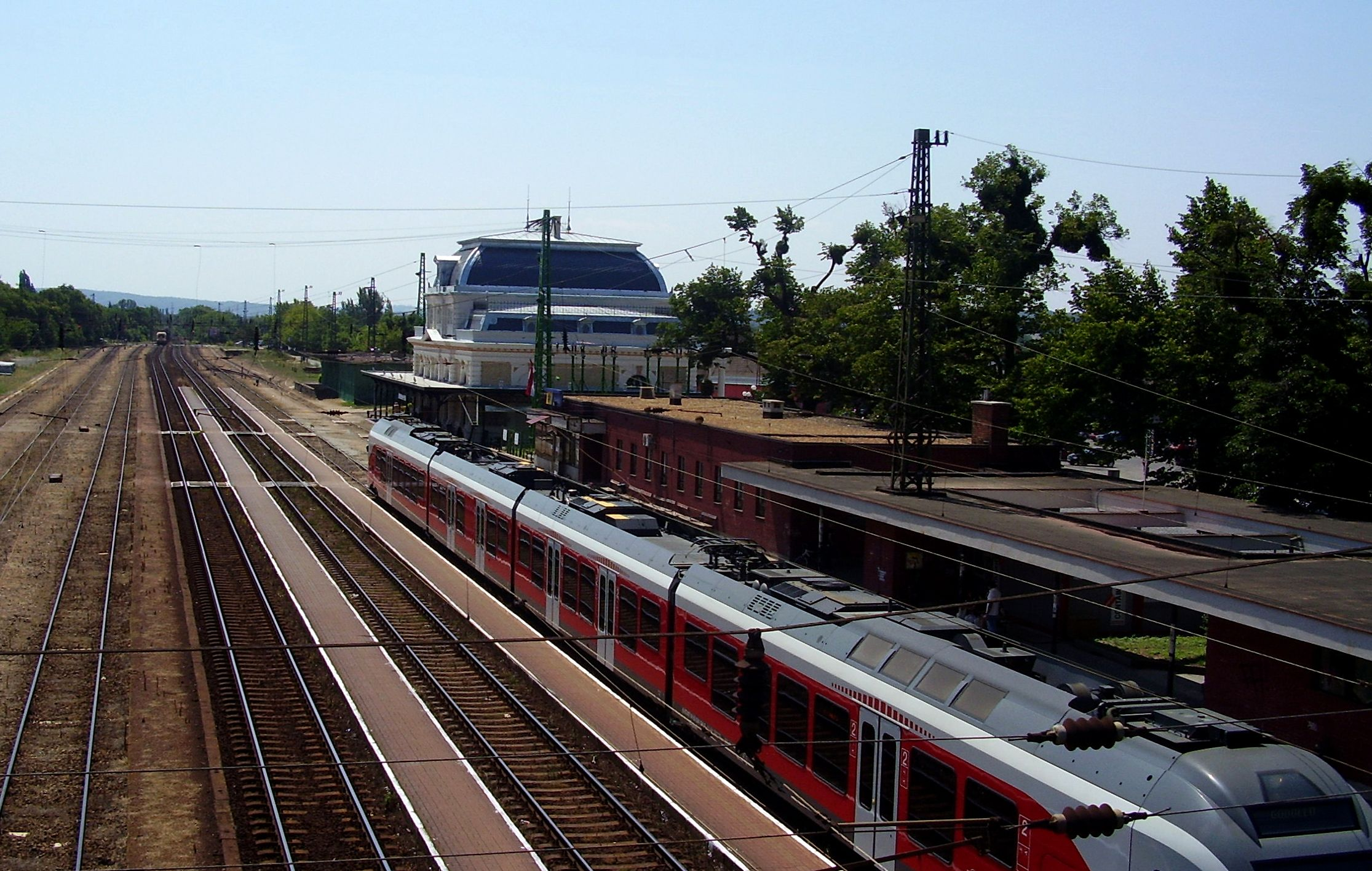
Railway Station

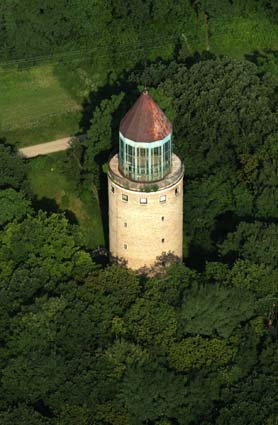
The water tower of Gödöllő

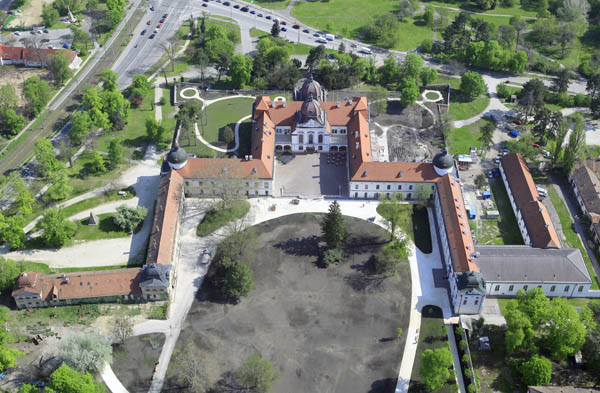
Aerial view of the palace

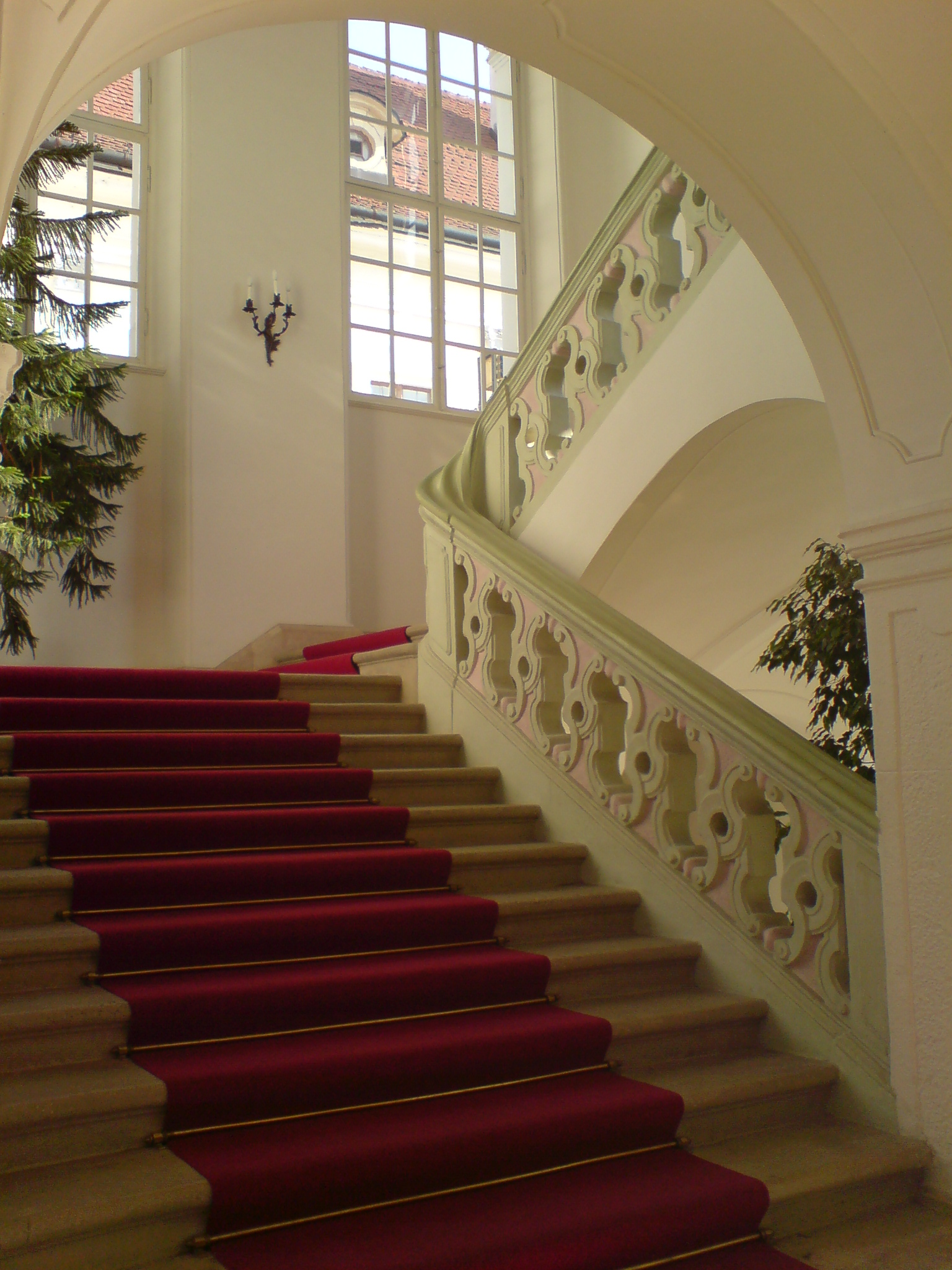
A stairway in the palace

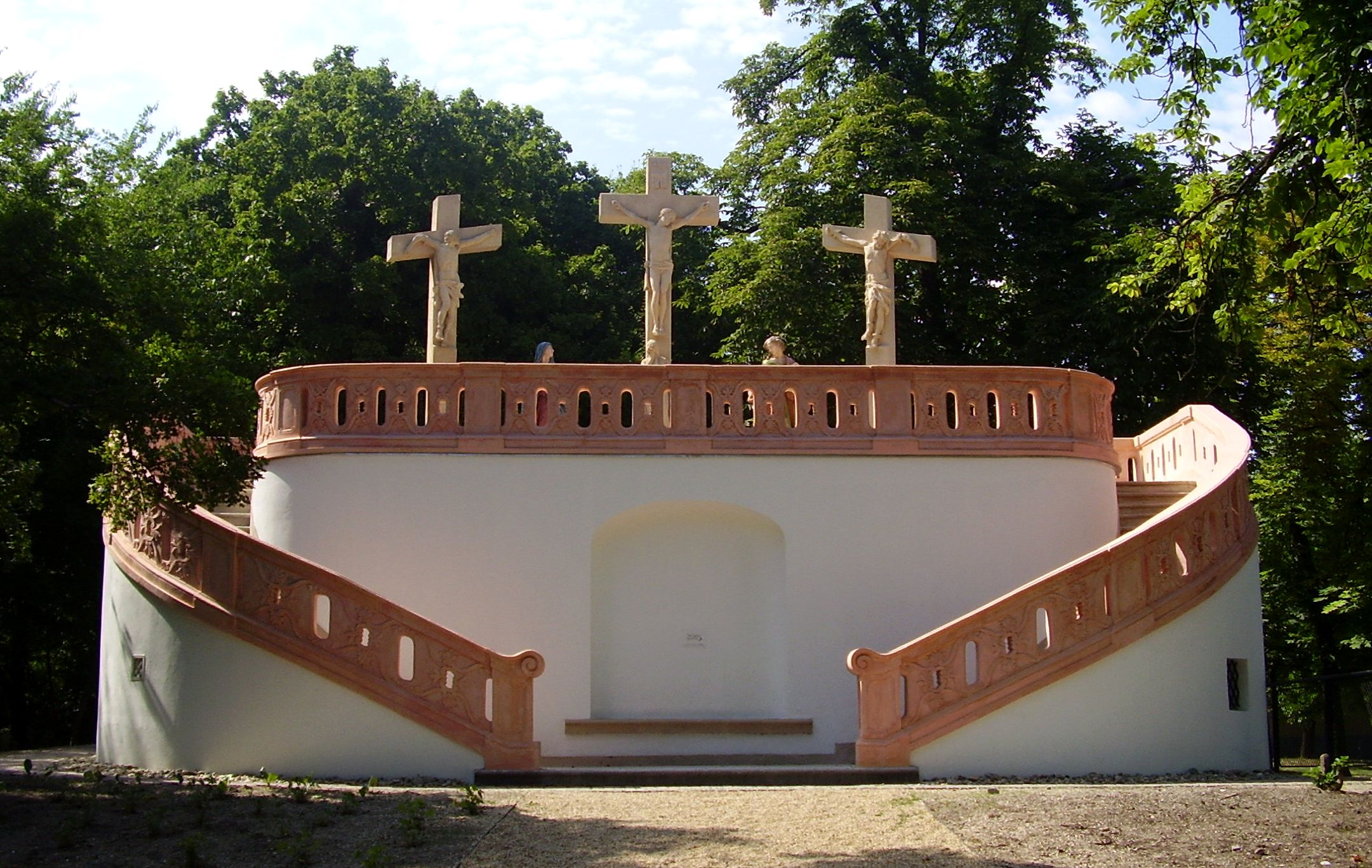
Calvary in the Erzsébet Park (Elizabeth's Park)

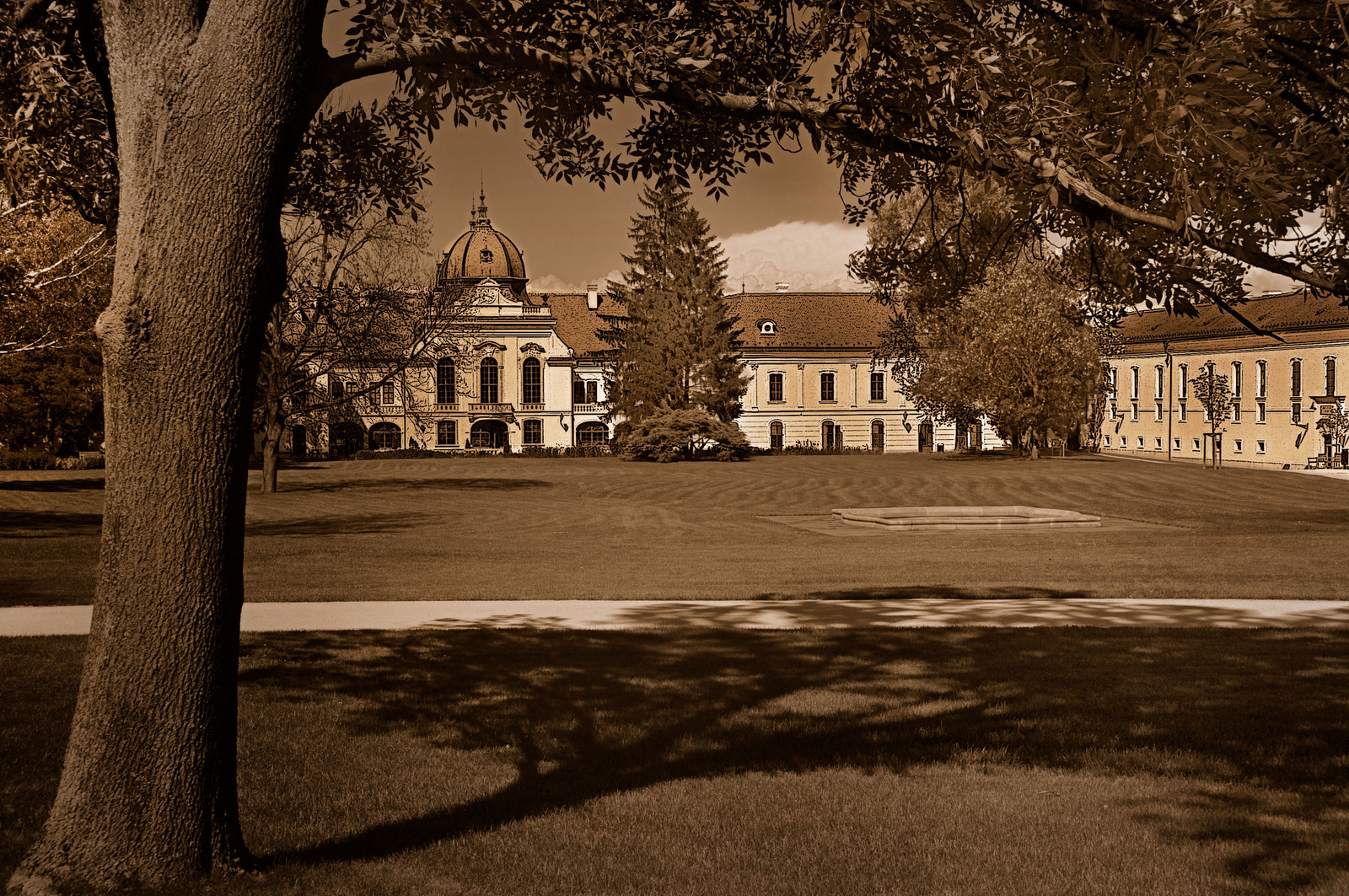

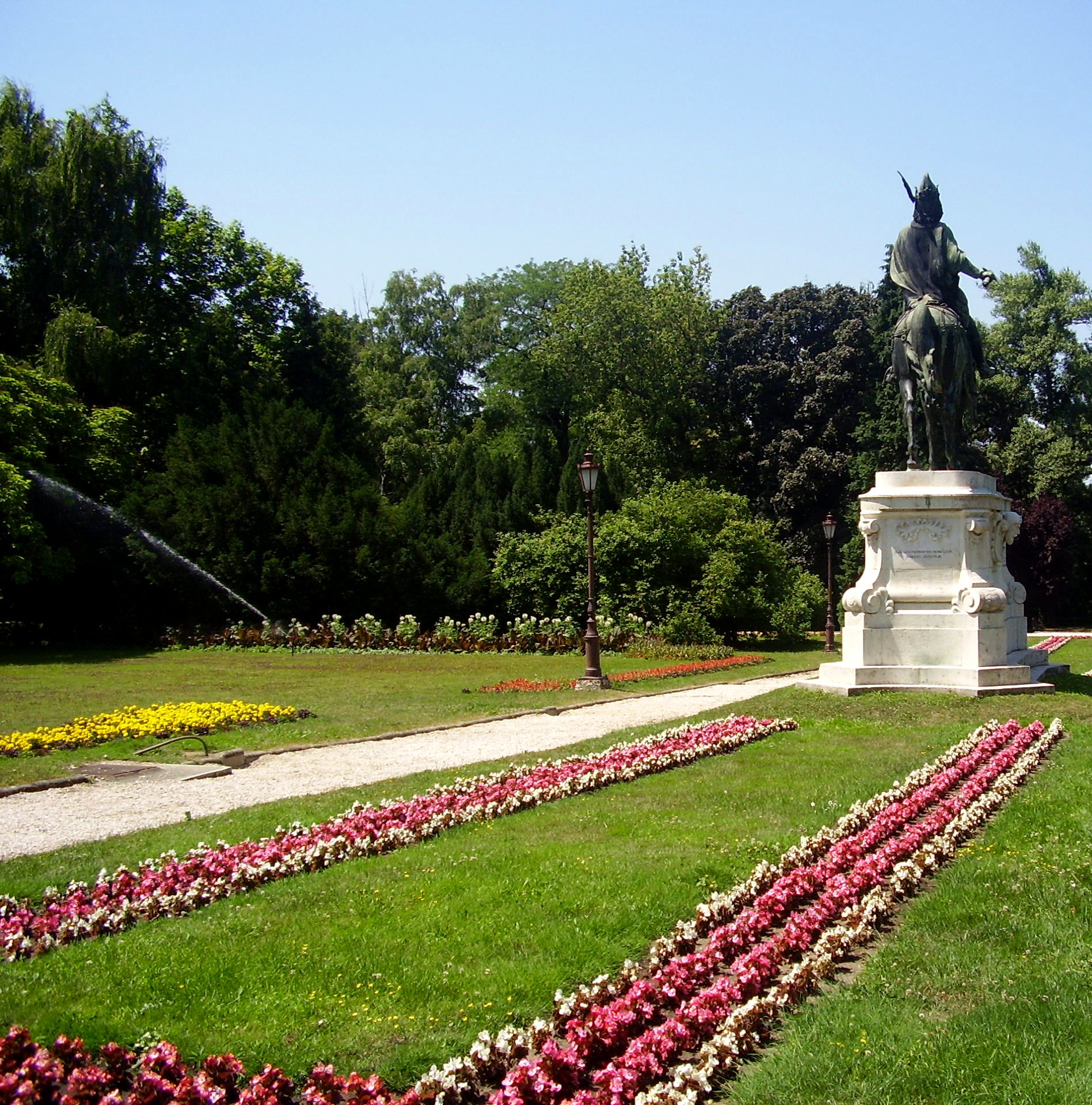
Garden of the university with the statue of Prince Kálmán

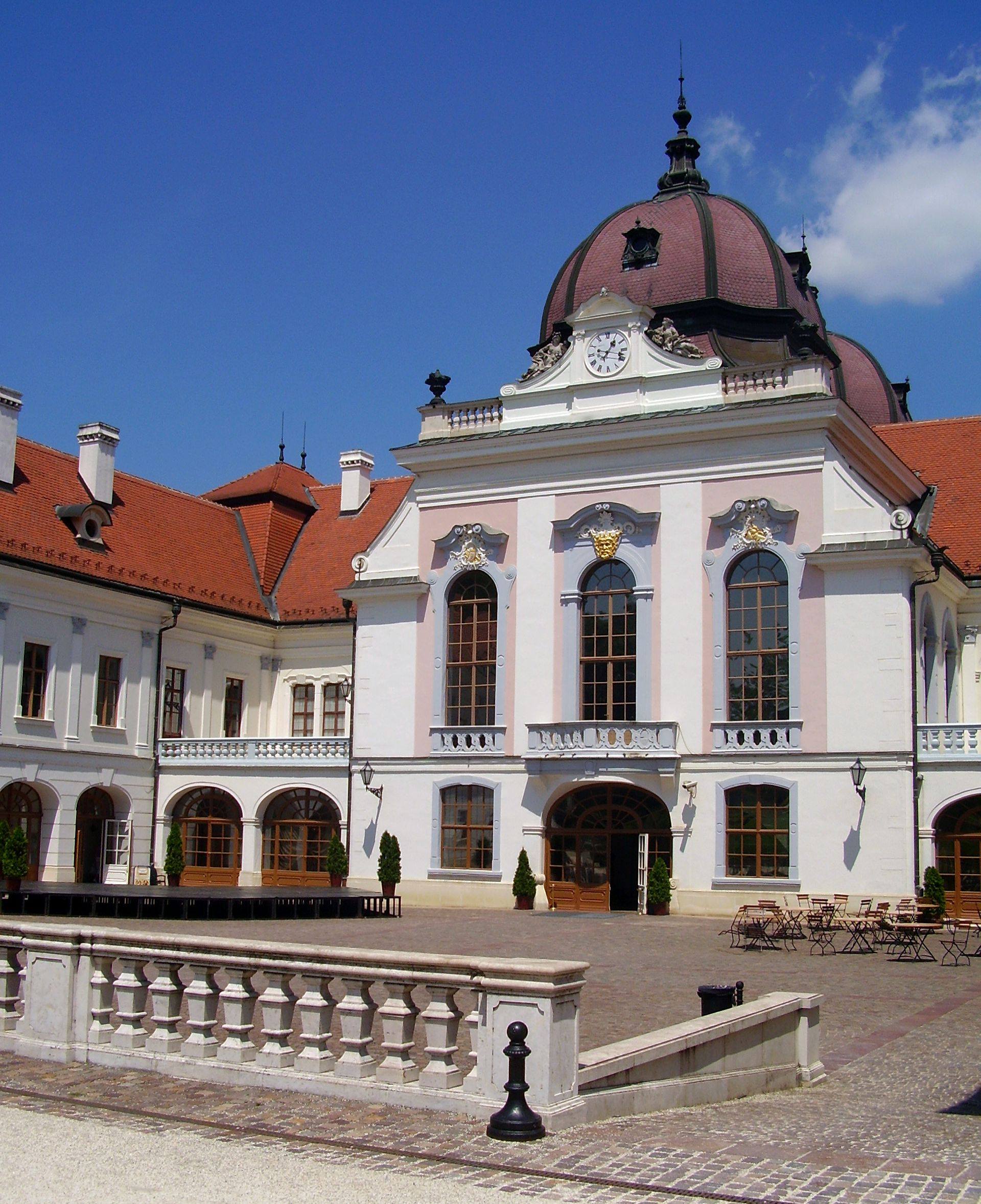

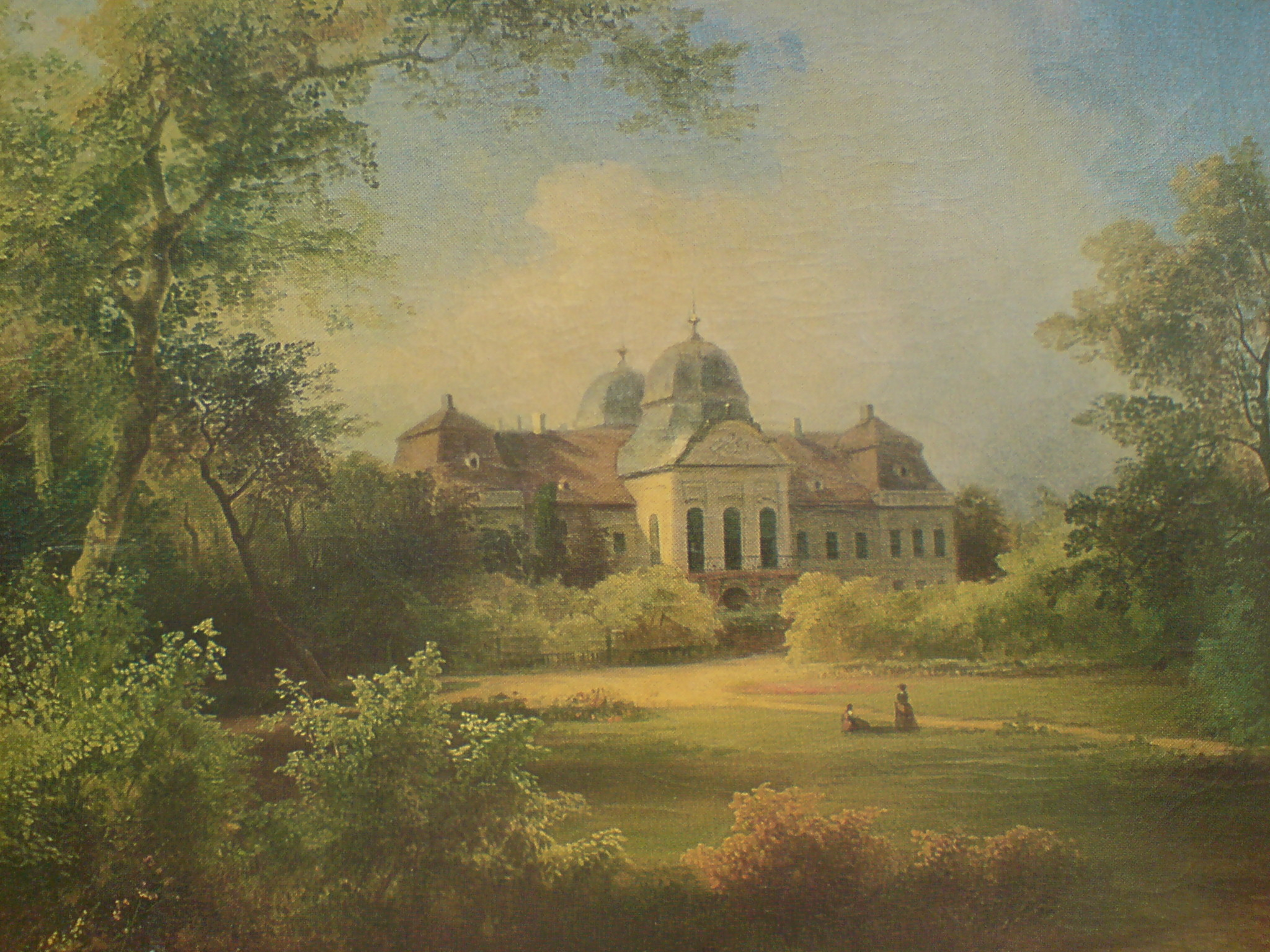
A painting from 1869 representing the palace

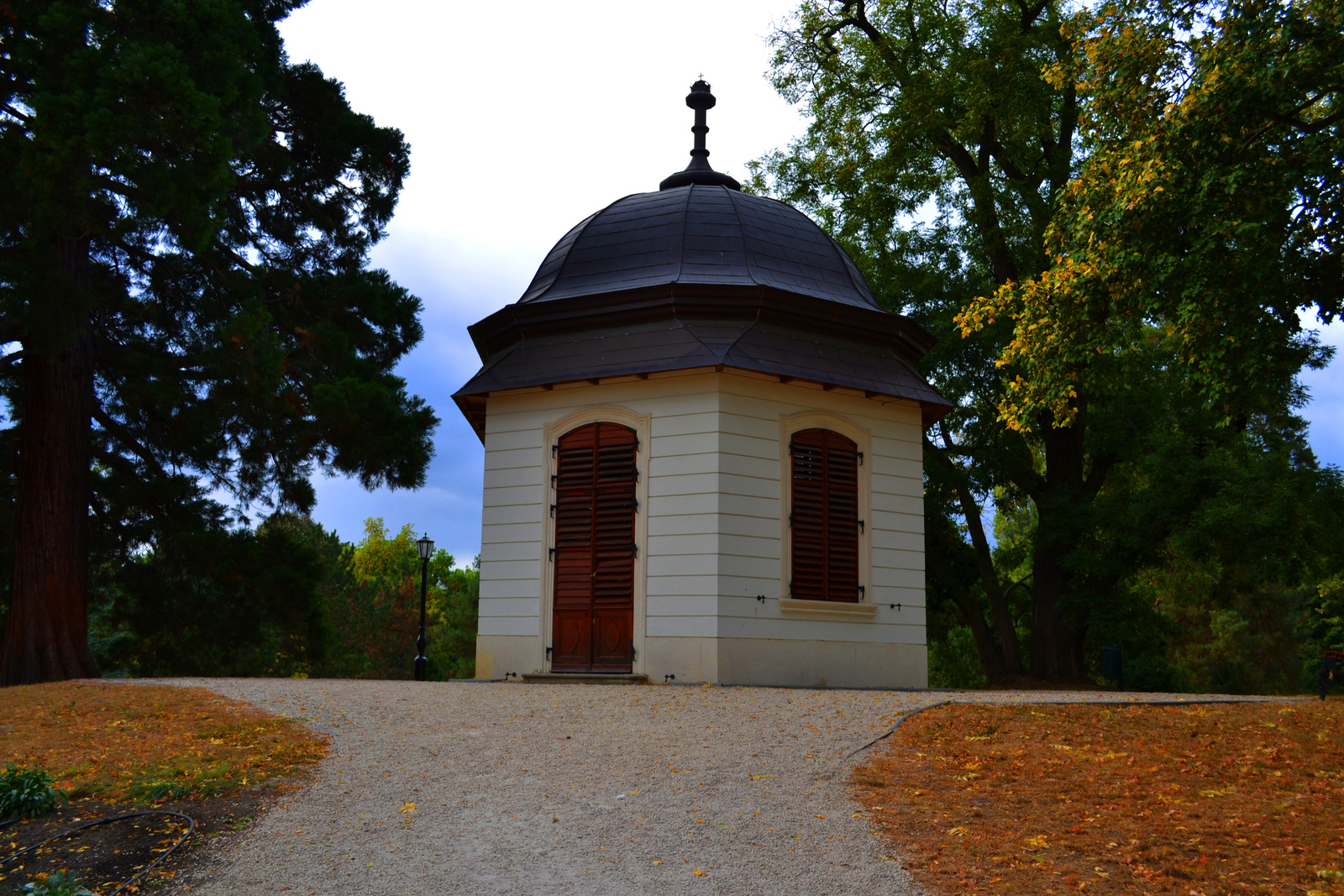
King's Hill pavilion in the Kastély Park (park of the palace)

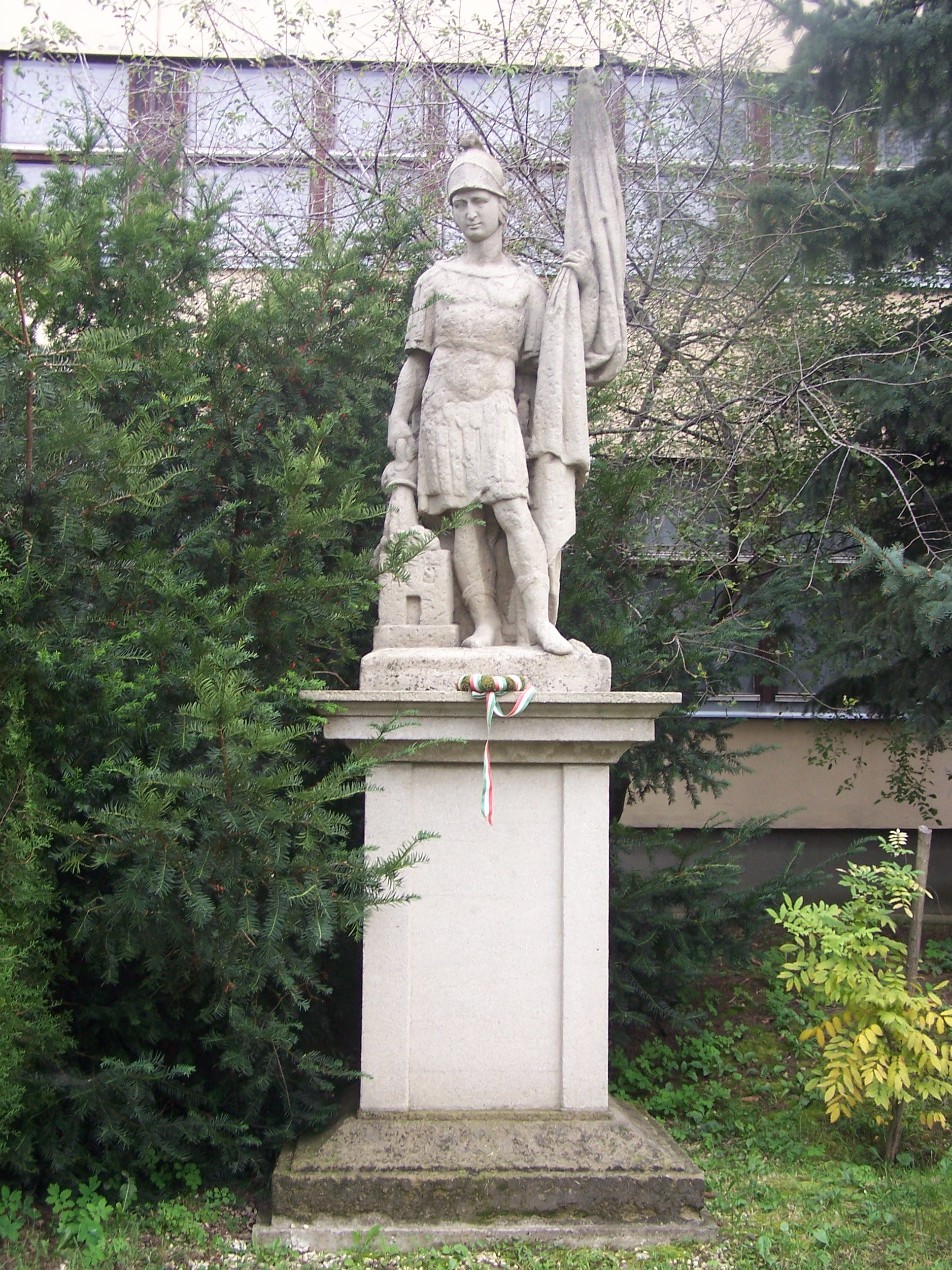
Statue of Saint Florian

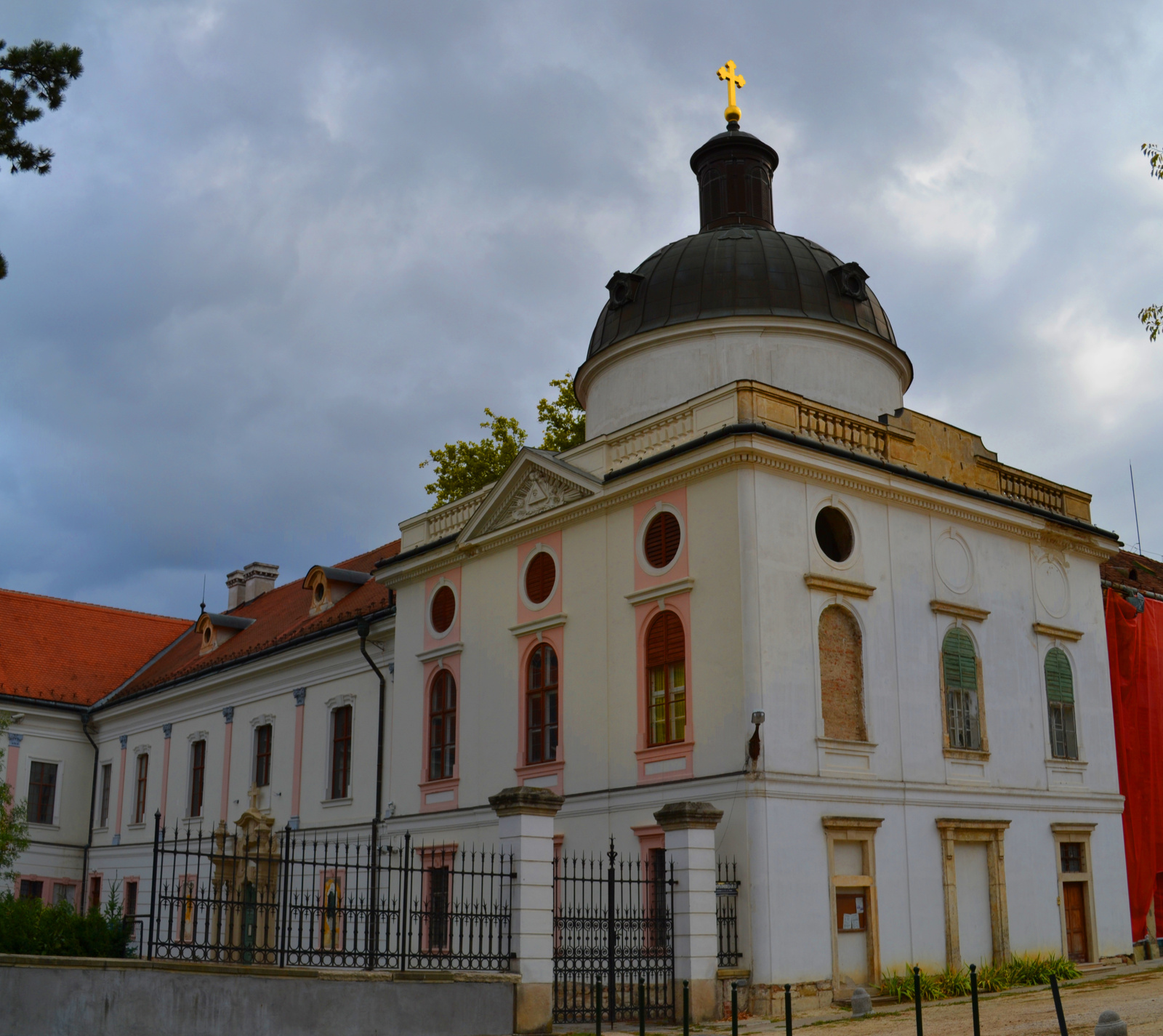
Chapel of the palace

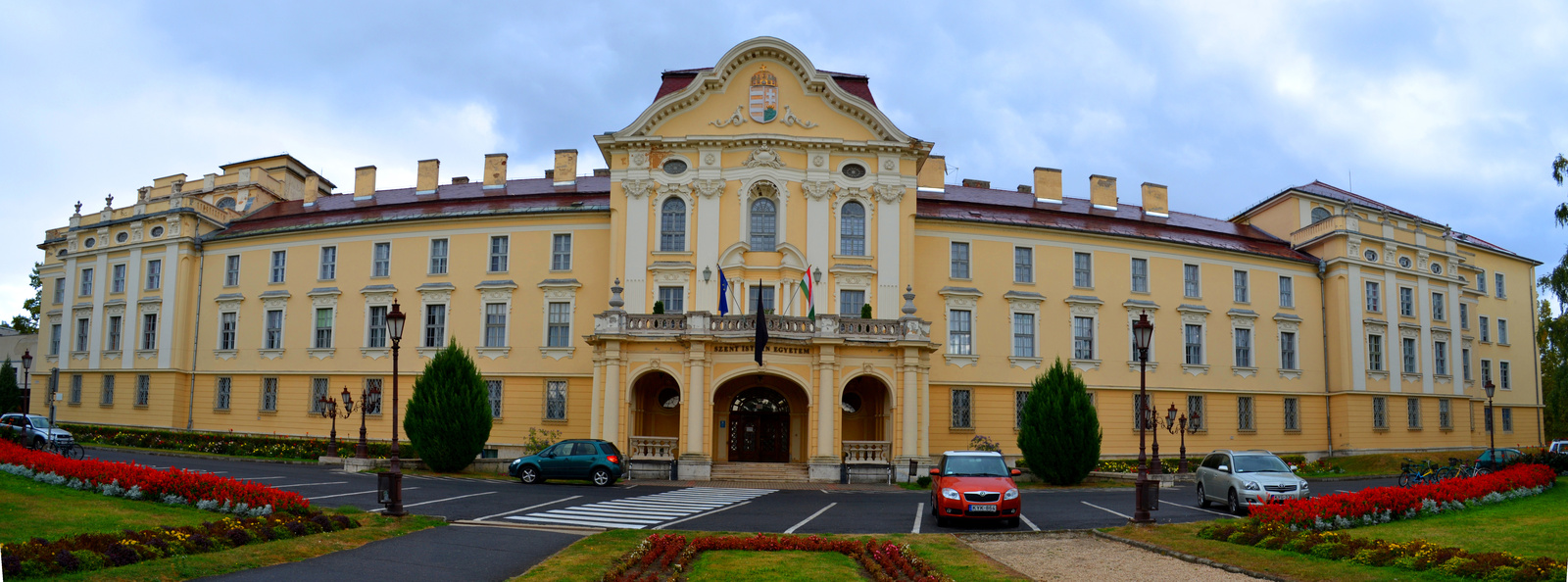
Main entrance of the university

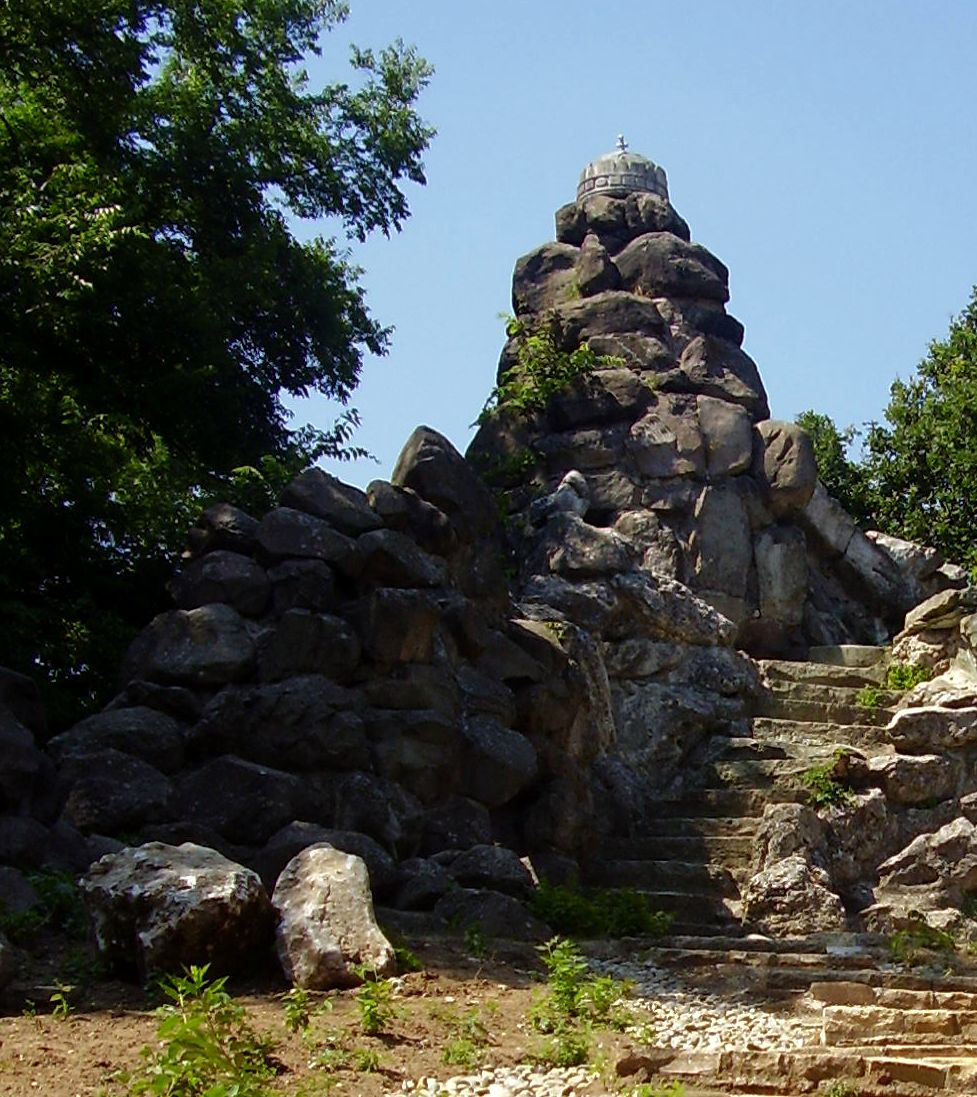
The Crown's Hill in the Erzsébet Park

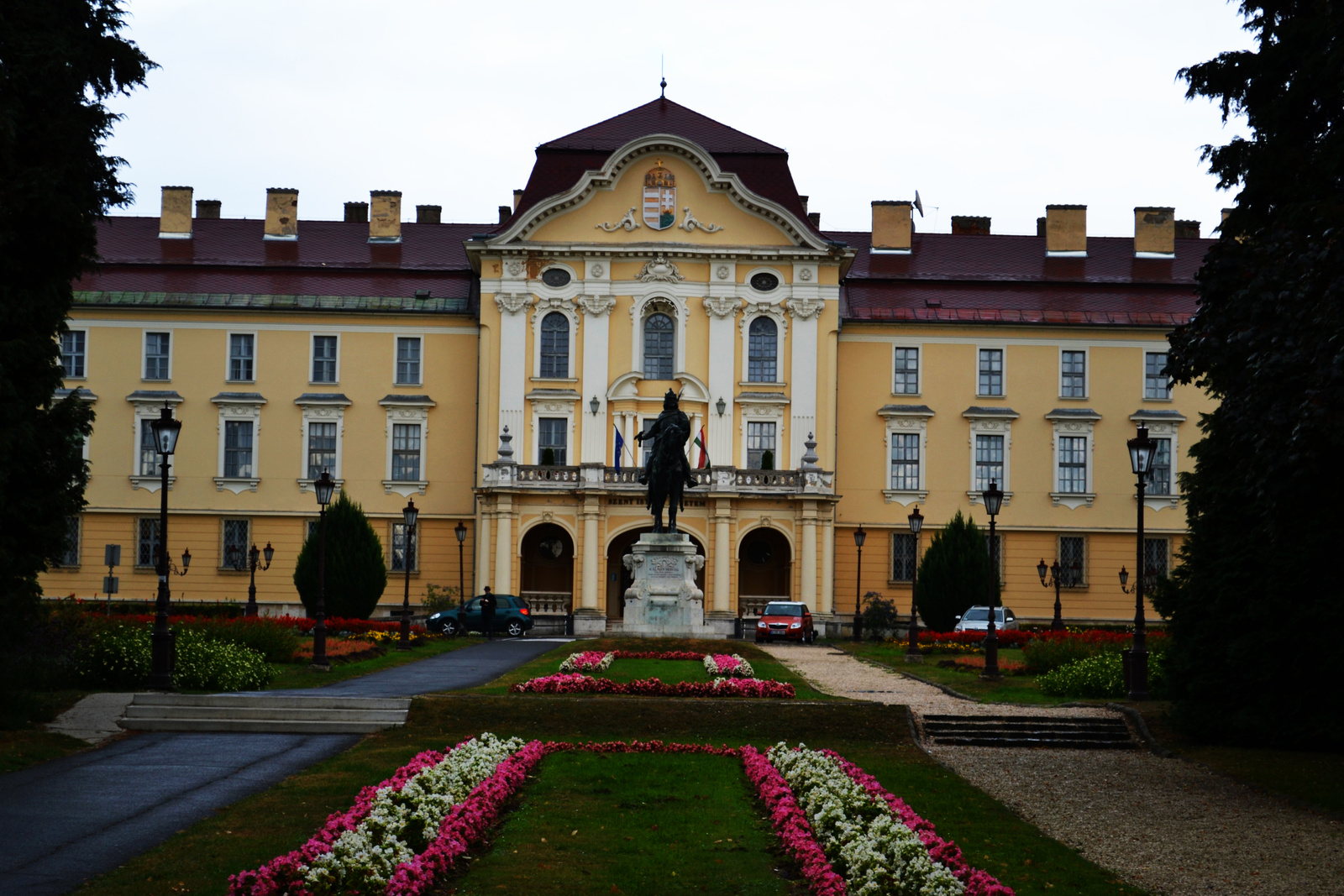

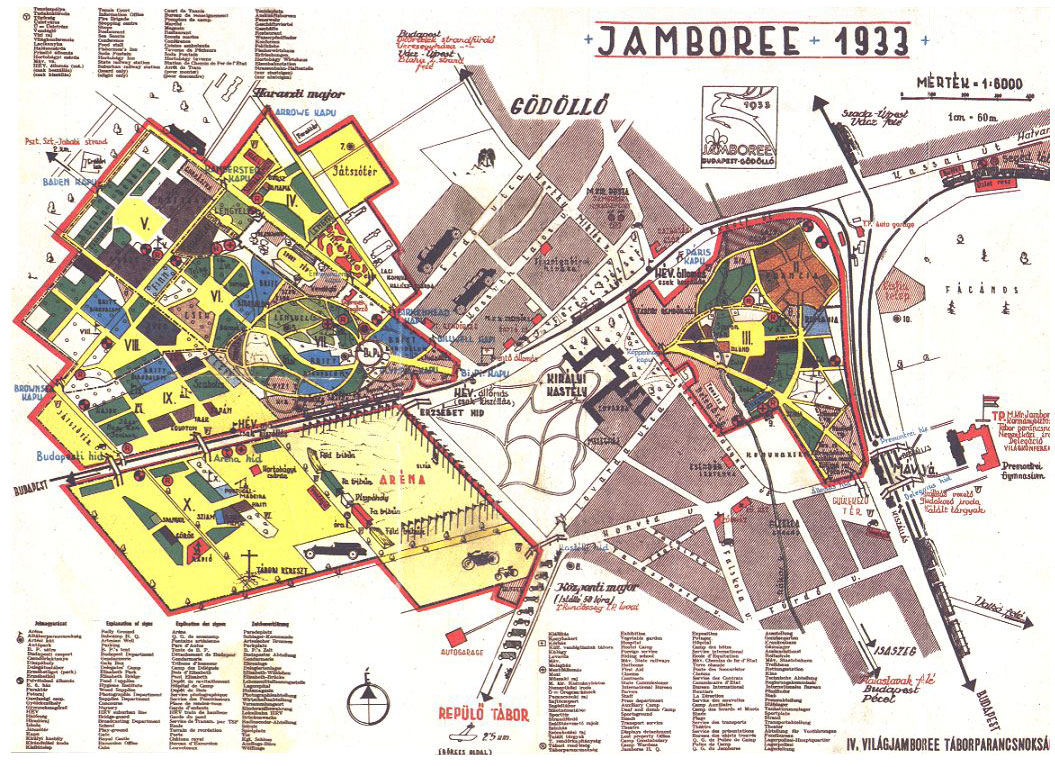
Map of Gödöllő during the 4th World Scout Jamboree

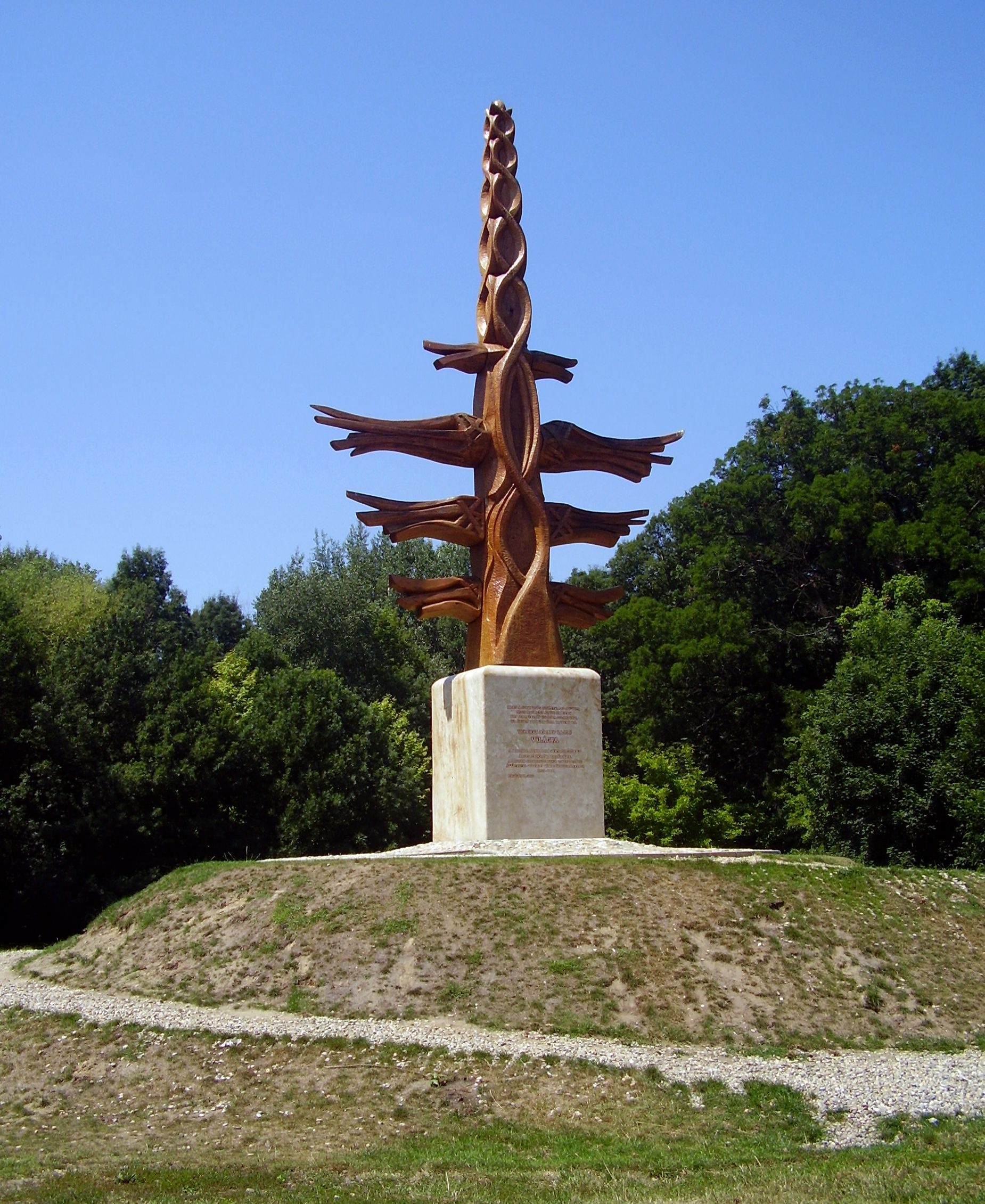
World Tree
