= World Peace Gong =

Indonesian symbol of world peace

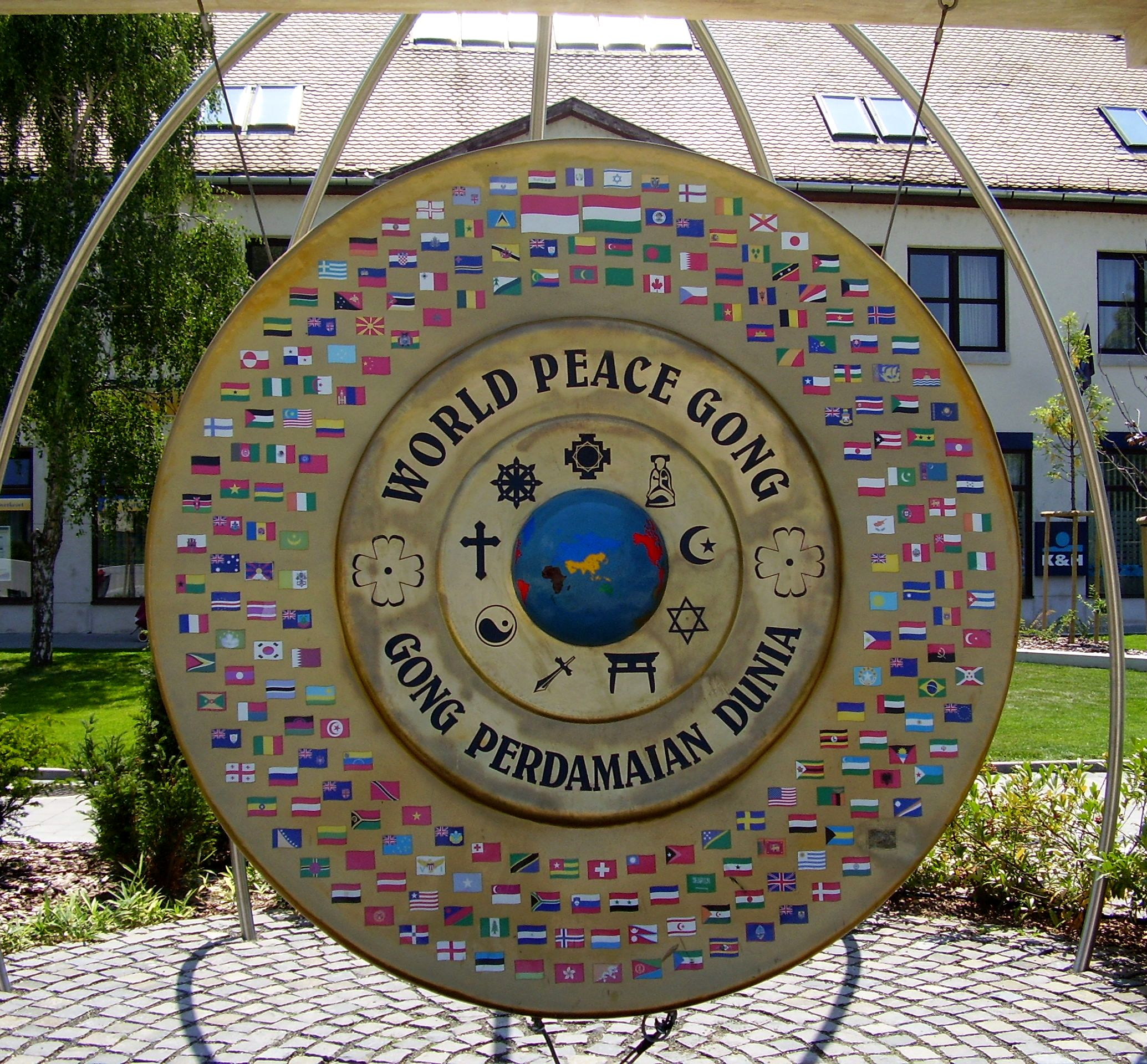
World Peace Gong in Hungary

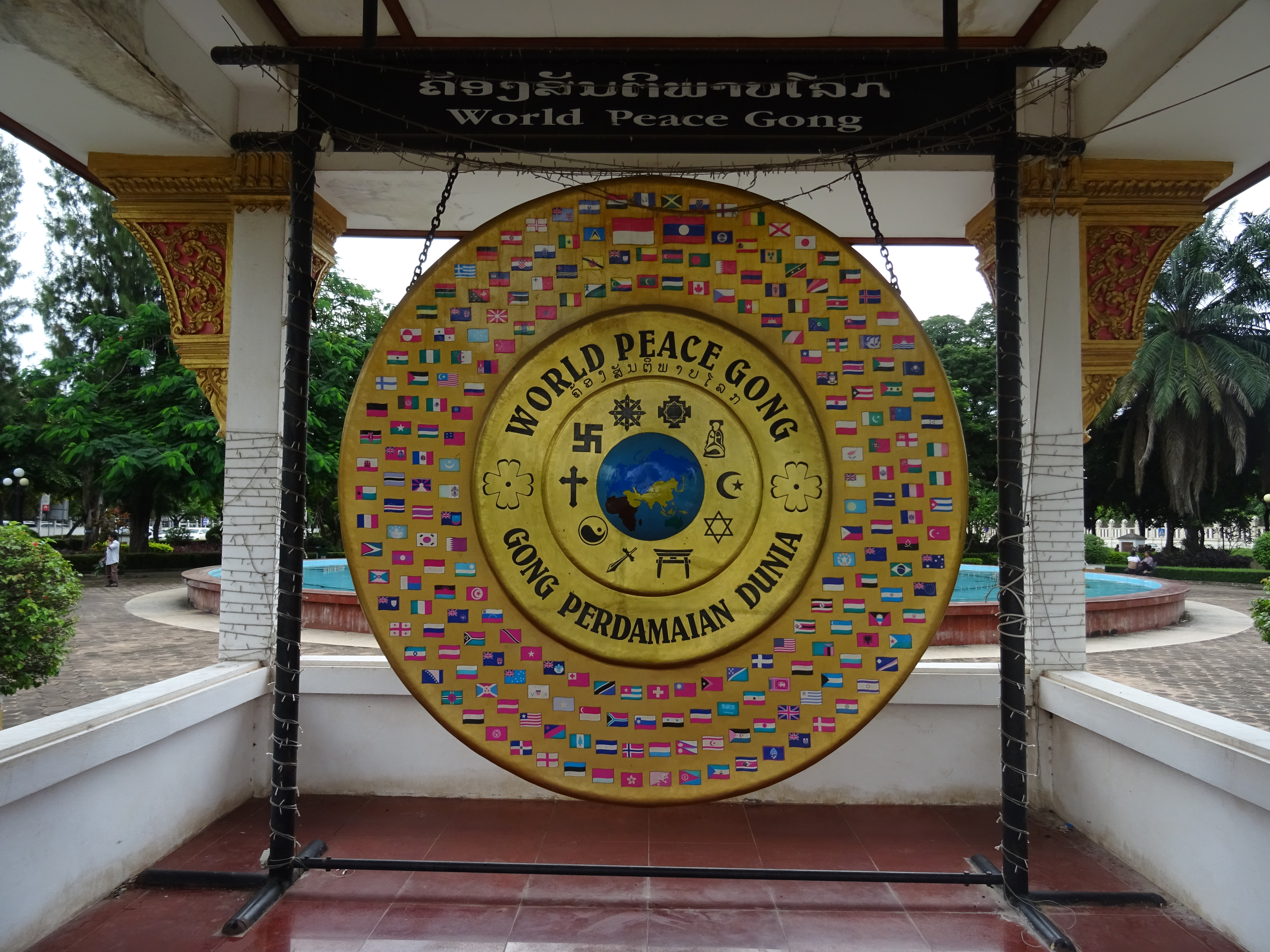
World Peace Gong in Vientiane, Laos

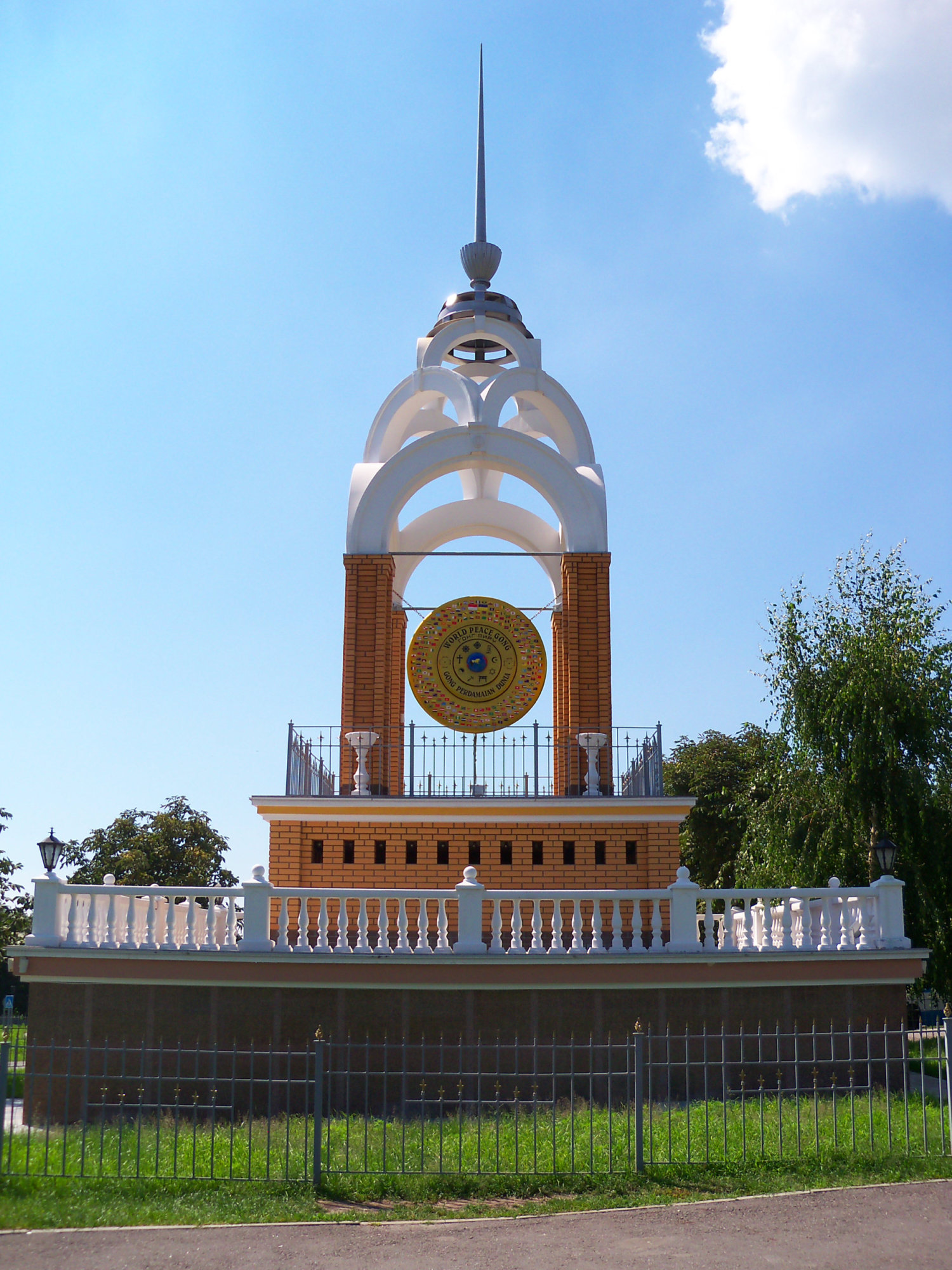
World Peace Gong in Kremenchuk, Ukraine

The World Peace Gong is a symbol of world peace.

== Function ==
The first striking of the World Peace Gong was by the President of the Republic of Indonesia, H.E.Mrs Megawati Sukarnoputri, in Bali on 31 December 2002 at 00:00 Central Standard time.

The Gong was struck for the following events:

- The Grand Opening "Second Global Summit on Peace Through Tourism" 5–8 February 2003 by the United Nations Secretary General in Geneva, Switzerland
- The Grand Opening "PATA Conference" 13–17 April 2003, Bali – Indonesia
- The Grand Opening "Borobudur International Festival" 11–17 June 2003, Central Java – Indonesia

== Locations ==
- Bali, Indonesia: The World Peace Gong Park can be found on the island of Bali, Indonesia Desa Budayal Kertalangu Bali. It was the venue for the Miss World Contestants commitment to World Peace, in September 2013,
- Geneva, Switzerland
- New Delhi, India
- Penglai, Shandong, China
- Vientiane, Laos
- Paipa (Colombia)
- Ambon (Indonesia)
- Maputo (Mozambique)
- Kremenchuk (Ukraine)
- Vukovar (Croatia)
- Berat (Albania)
- Gödöllő (Hungary)
- Jepara (Indonesia)
- Kuala Lumpur (Malaysia)
- Ciamis (Indonesia)
