= Ambon, Maluku =

Capital and largest city of Maluku, Indonesia

Ambon
- City
- City of Ambon; Kota Ambon
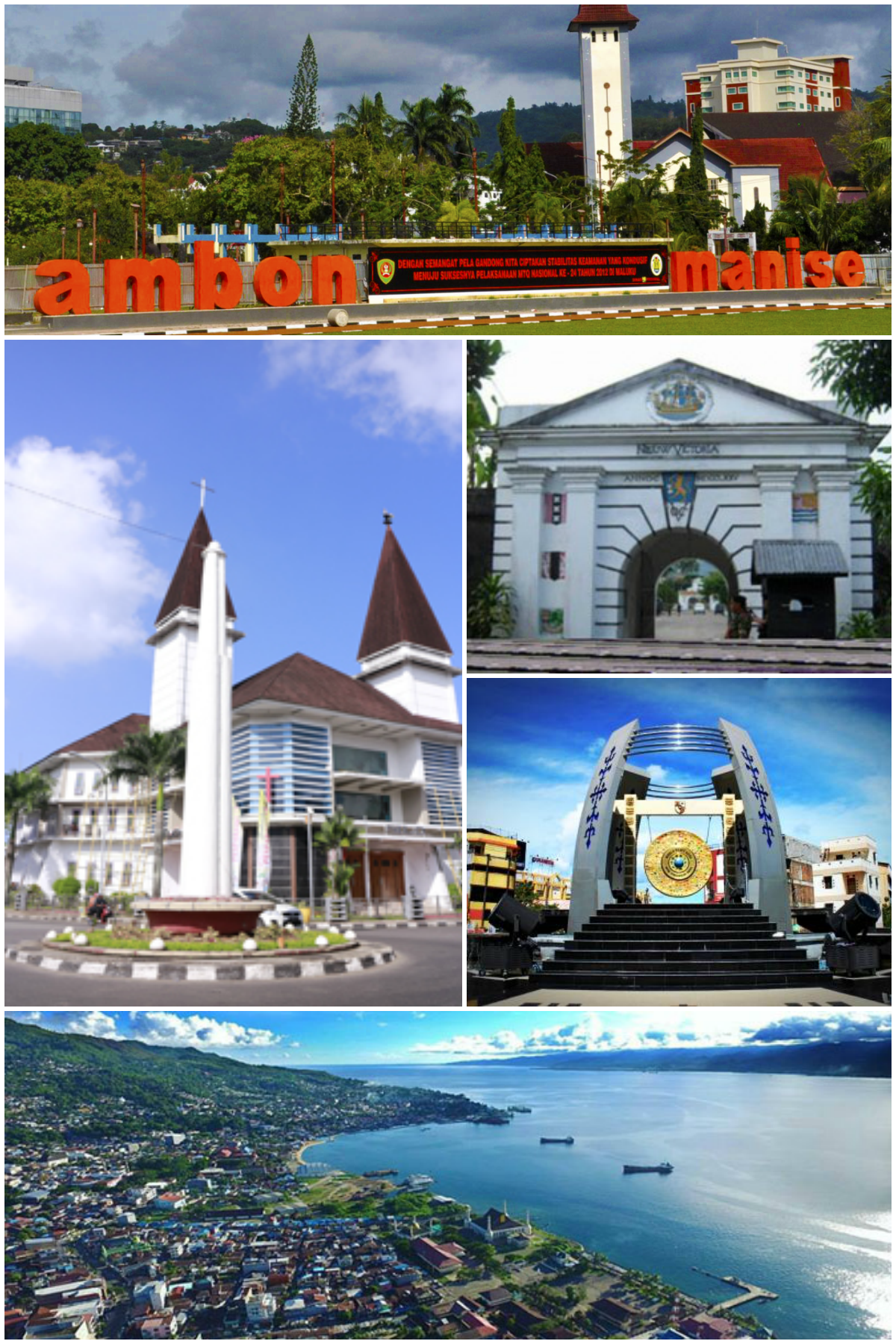
- Clockwise from top: Merdeka Square, Fort Victoria (Ambon), World Peace Gong, Ambon Bay, and Trikora Monument as well as Silo Church.

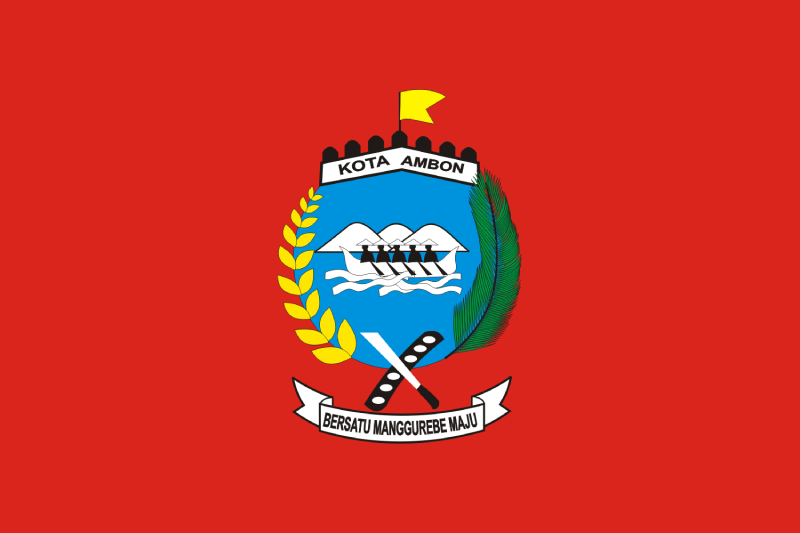
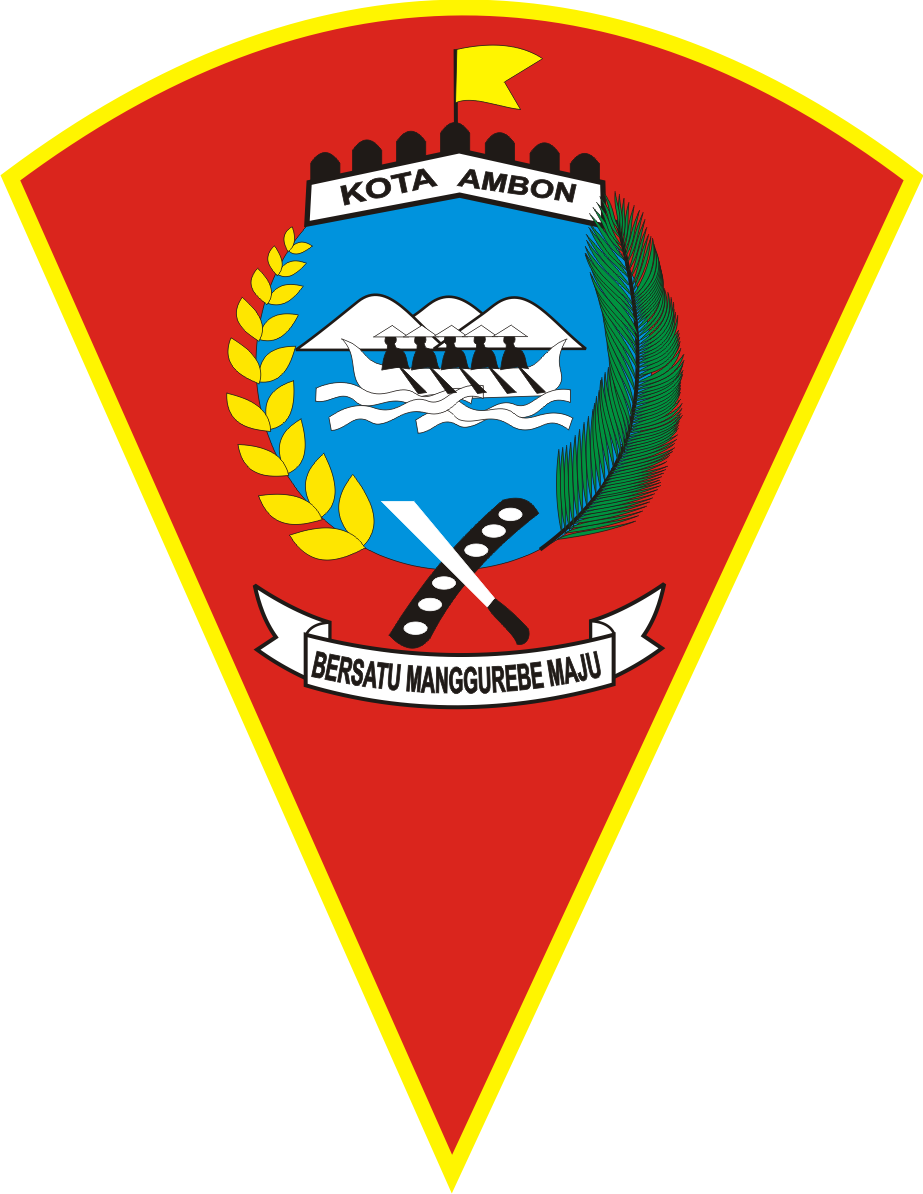
- Flag Coat of arms
- Motto(s): Bersatu Manggurebe Maju (Ambonese) "Unite and Compete to Progress"
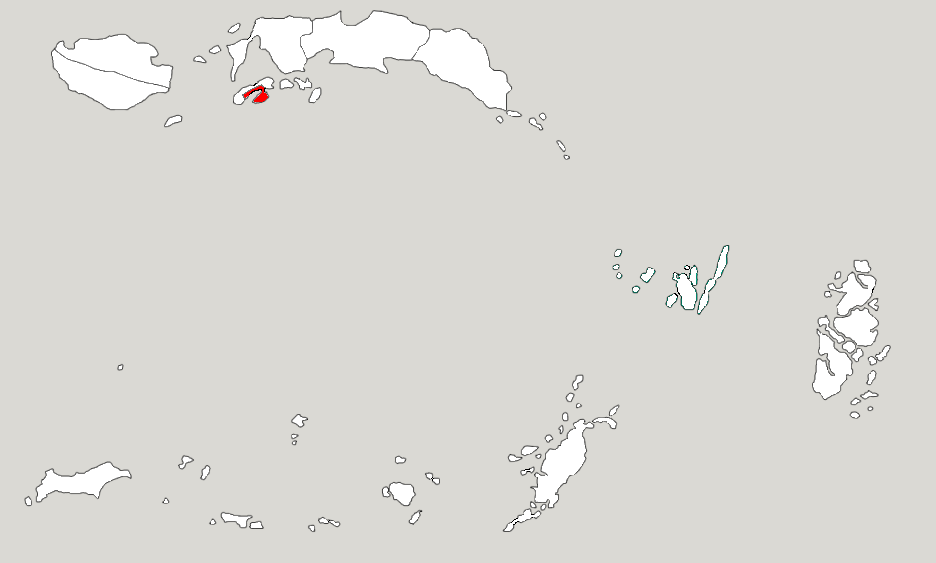
- Location within Maluku
- Interactive map of Ambon
- Location in Maluku and Indonesia Ambon (Indonesia)
- Coordinates: 3°41′48″S 128°10′42″E
- Country: Indonesia
- Province: Maluku
- Incorporated: 7 September 1575

Government
  - Mayor: Bodewin Wattimena (indp.)
  - Vice Mayor: Elly Toisutta
  - Legislature: Ambon City Regional House of Representatives

Area
  - Total: 359.45 km^{2} (138.78 sq mi)
- Elevation: 3 m (9.8 ft)

Population (mid 2024 estimate)
  - Total: 357,289
  - Density: 993.99/km^{2} (2,574.4/sq mi)
- Area code: (+62) 911
- Website: ambon.go.id

Ambon (Indonesian pronunciation: [ˈambɔn]; formerly Dutch: Amboina) is the capital and largest city of the Indonesian province of Maluku. This city is also known as Ambon Manise, which means "beautiful" or "pretty" Ambon in the Ambonese language. It covers a land area of 359.45 square kilometres (138.78 sq mi), and had a population of 331,254 at the 2010 Census and 347,288 at the 2020 Census; the official estimate as of mid 2024 was 357,289. The city is divided into five administrative districts (kecamatan) – namely Nusaniwe, Sirimau, Teluk Ambon (Ambon Bay), Baguala (officially Teluk Ambon Baguala) and Leitimur Selatan (South Leitimur). Known as Indonesia's music city, Ambon became the first city in Southeast Asia to be recognised as the UNESCO City of Music in 2019.

== History ==
Affiliation history of Ambon City

Portugal (1513–1605)
VOC (1605–1796)
Great Britain (1796—1800)
United Kingdom (1800–1803)
Dutch East Indies (1803–1811)
United Kingdom (1811–1816)
Dutch East Indies (1816–1942)
Japan (1942–1945)
Dutch East Indies (1945–1949)
Indonesia (1949–present) (Note: De facto, while de jure it has been part of Indonesia since 19 August 1945, as part of Maluku Province according to the decision of the Preparatory Committee for Indonesian Independence.)

=== Origin of the name ===
The origin of the term "Ambon" is not easily determined. According to local accounts, the term is derived from the word embun (mist/dew). The mountain peaks on Ambon Island are frequently covered by thick mist. The term Laha was also once used to name the Fort of Nossa Senhora da Anunciada, which became the precursor of the settlement. In the local language, laha is translated as "harbor."

Although the term "Ambon" now refers to Ambon City, Ambon Island, or the Ambonese people, throughout history (especially in the 20th century), it referred to the inhabitants of Central Maluku. The phrase "Ambonese people" (Ambonezen) itself referred to the residents of Central Maluku, even though it was originally only used for the inhabitants of Ambon City who possessed a mestizo culture.

=== Fort Victoria ===
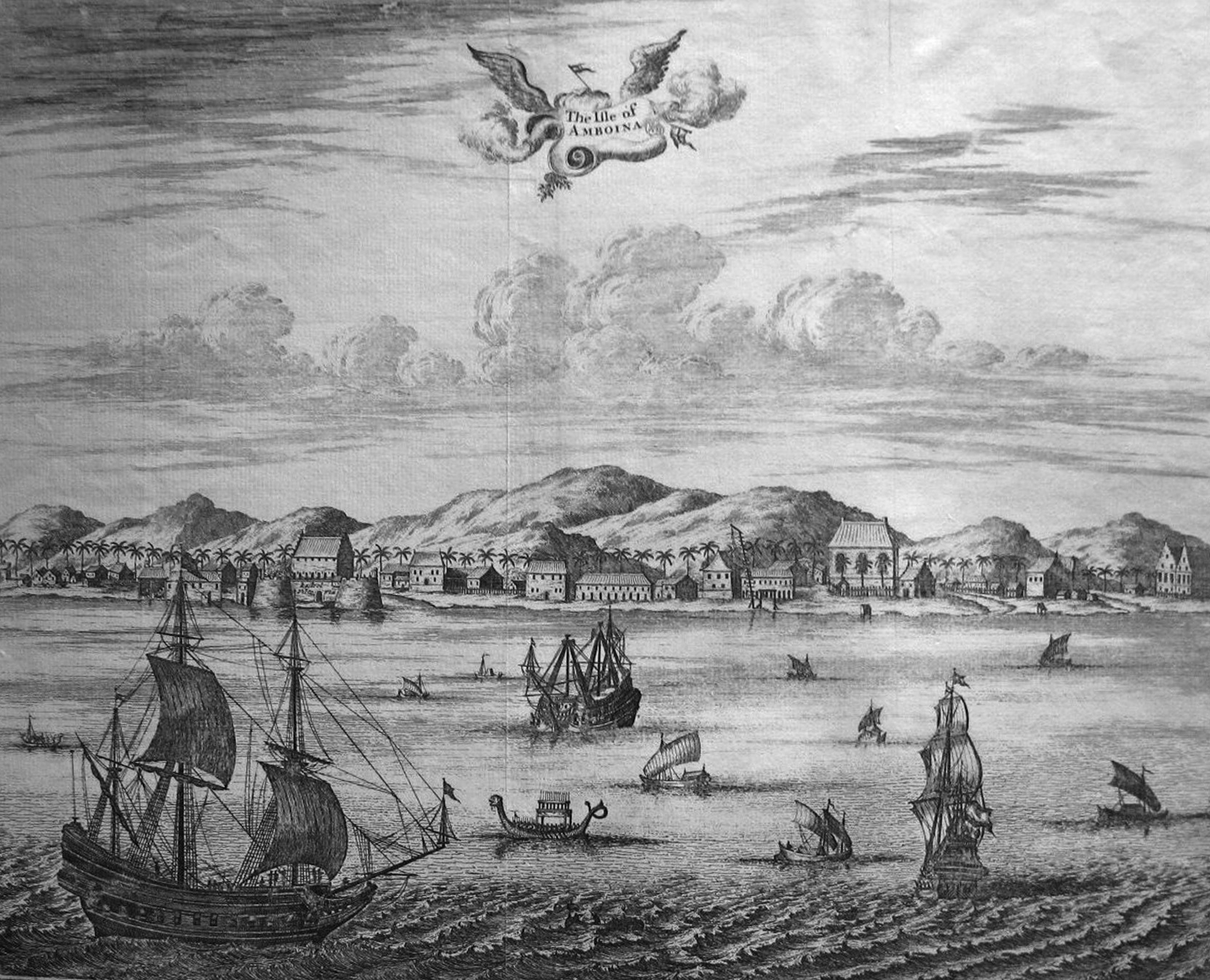
Amboina in the 17th century under Portugal.

Coat of arms of Ambon during colonial era, granted in 1930. The motto (in Dutch): DOOR DE EEUWEN TROUW ("Loyalty through the ages")

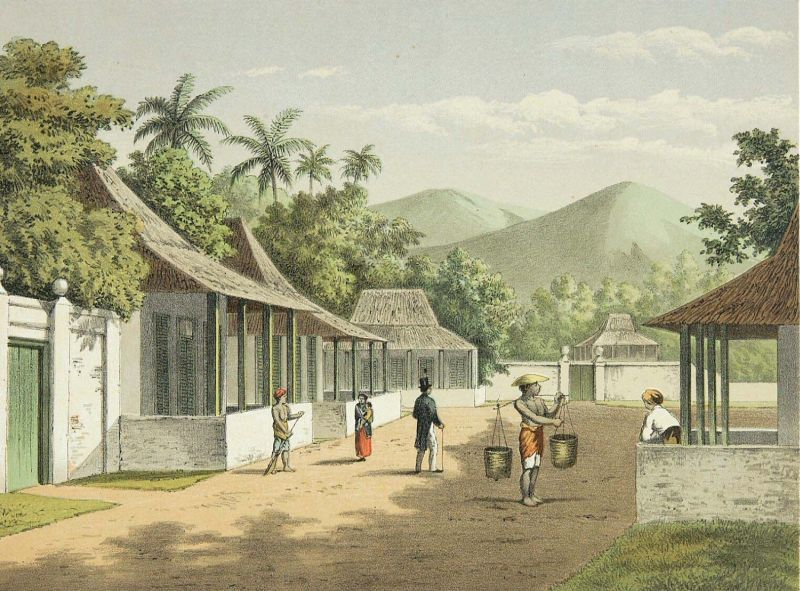
Lithograph of a street view in Ambon (1880s)

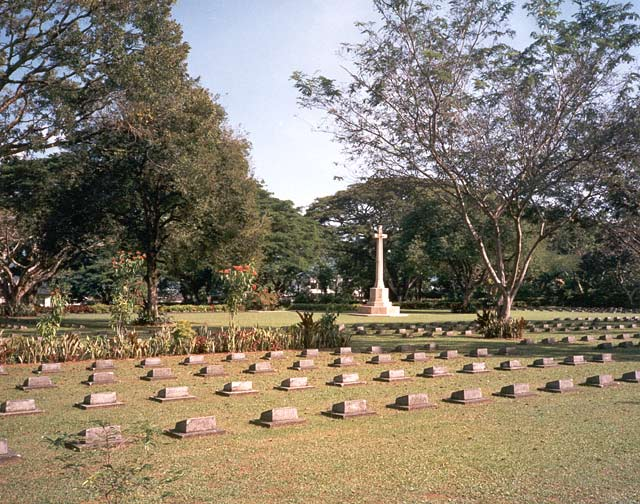
Ambon War Cemetery which holds the remains of 1,777 Allied soldiers

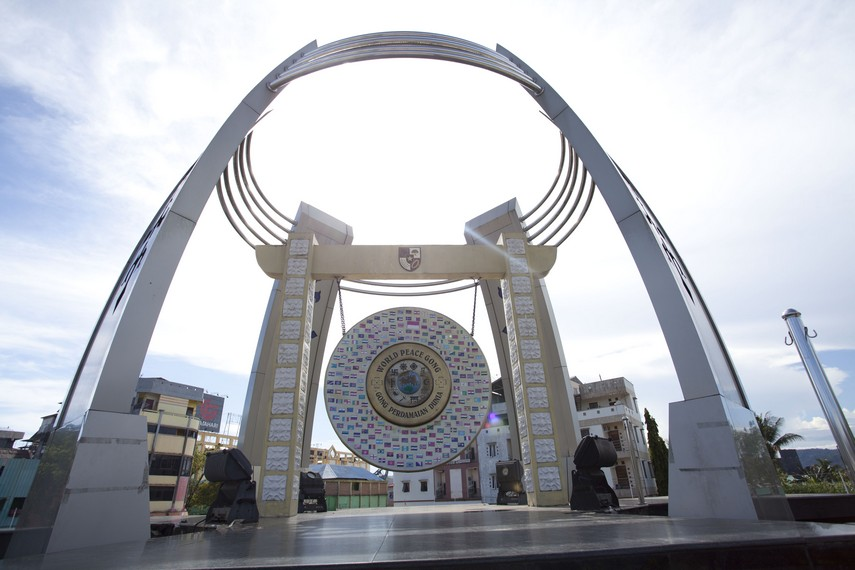
The 35th World Peace Gong

Ambon City began to develop following the arrival of the Portuguese in 1513. Later, around 1575, Portuguese authorities mobilized the local population to build the Kota Laha Fort (also known as the Ferangi Fort), which was originally named Nossa Senhora da Anunciada, located on the Honipopu Plain. During its construction, the workers established village-like organizations such as Soya, which became the foundation of Ambon City. This was because, in its subsequent development, these groups evolved into an organized territorial genealogical society.

=== Dutch period ===
After the Dutch successfully seized the Maluku Islands and specifically Ambon from Portuguese control, the Nossa Senhora de Anunciada fort was captured in 1605 and turned into the center of colonial administration under the name Victoria. Following a severe earthquake that caused heavy damage, the fort was renovated and renamed Nieuw Victoria, though it remained better known among locals as Fort Victoria. This fort is historically significant as the site where the national hero Pattimura was executed by hanging on 16 December 1817.

Ambon Island was conquered by the Dutch East India Company (VOC) on 23 February 1605, with military assistance from Ternate, Luhu, Hitu and Gowa. During the early VOC era, several governors held power, including the authoritarian Adrian Martensz Block, who utilized forced labor to expand Fort Victoria, and Herman van Speult, who oppressed the people through spice trade monopolies.

On 17 February 1796, the VOC surrendered to British Admiral Pieter Ramier, making Ambon part of British territory until 1803. Afterward, control was handed back to the Dutch government (rather than the VOC, which had gone bankrupt in 1799). During the Dutch East Indies era, Ambon underwent modernization. Fort Victoria became the capital of the Government of Amboina, part of the Government der Molukken established in 1817. On 7 September 1921, the people of Ambon were granted equal rights to the colonial government, marking a political victory for the local struggle and allowing them to play a role in governance.

=== Japanese occupation ===
Japanese troops landed in Ambon on 1 February 1942. They defeated the Dutch and their allies in the Battle of Ambon to seize the city, which served as a strategic naval and air base. During this occupation, citizens suffered from poverty and famine due to the war. Remnants of this era can still be found today, such as the Ambon War Cemetery for Allied soldiers and Japanese torpedoes discovered at the bottom of Ambon Bay.

=== Indonesian independence ===
The anniversary of Ambon City was officially set as 7 September 1575. This date was determined during a 1972 seminar involving Pattimura University. The year 1575 commemorates the start of the construction of Fort Kota Laha, while the date 7 September honors the day in 1921 when Ambon citizens achieved equal political rights. The city's anniversary was first celebrated on 7 September 1973.

== Geography and climate ==
=== Topography ===
Most of the land area can be classified as hilly to steeply sloping, while 17% of the land area can be classified as more flat or shallow-sloped.

=== Climate ===
Ambon experiences a tropical rainforest climate (Af) according to the Köppen climate classification as there is no real dry season. The driest month is November with total precipitation of 114 mm (4.5 in), while the wettest month is June with total precipitation of 638 mm (25.1 in). As it is located near the equator, the temperature throughout the year is constant. The hottest month is December, with an average temperature of 27.2 °C (81 °F), while the coolest month is July, with an average temperature 25 °C (77 °F).

Climate data for Ambon, Maluku, Indonesia (extremes 1912–1936)
Month	Jan	Feb	Mar	Apr	May	Jun	Jul	Aug	Sep	Oct	Nov	Dec	Year
Mean daily maximum °C (°F)	31.3 (88.3)	31.4 (88.5)	31.1 (88.0)	30.7 (87.3)	29.8 (85.6)	28.5 (83.3)	27.5 (81.5)	27.8 (82.0)	29.1 (84.4)	30.3 (86.5)	31.1 (88.0)	31.5 (88.7)	30.0 (86.0)
Daily mean °C (°F)	27.0 (80.6)	27.0 (80.6)	26.9 (80.4)	26.7 (80.1)	26.4 (79.5)	25.6 (78.1)	25.0 (77.0)	25.1 (77.2)	25.7 (78.3)	26.5 (79.7)	27.0 (80.6)	27.2 (81.0)	26.3 (79.3)
Mean daily minimum °C (°F)	24.1 (75.4)	24.1 (75.4)	23.8 (74.8)	23.9 (75.0)	24.0 (75.2)	23.6 (74.5)	23.2 (73.8)	23.1 (73.6)	23.3 (73.9)	23.8 (74.8)	24.1 (75.4)	24.2 (75.6)	23.8 (74.8)
Average rainfall mm (inches)	127 (5.0)	119 (4.7)	135 (5.3)	279 (11.0)	516 (20.3)	638 (25.1)	602 (23.7)	401 (15.8)	241 (9.5)	155 (6.1)	114 (4.5)	132 (5.2)	3,459 (136.2)
Average rainy days	12	13	12	12	19	21	22	21	16	10	10	13	181
Mean monthly sunshine hours	192	186	211	177	158	120	115	112	150	192	219	202	2,034
Source 1: Deutscher Wetterdienst
Source 2: Danish Meteorological Institute

== Government ==
Ambon City was established under Law Number 60 of 1958, enacted on 17 July 1958. It is part of the Maluku Province and holds the status of a city in Indonesia. Similar to other Indonesian cities, its administration is divided into three levels: city, district (kecamatan), and sub-district (kelurahan) or village (desa). As part of the Maluku Islands, some villages in the city are also known by the traditional term negeri.

The city administration is led by a Mayor who is accountable to the Ambon City Regional House of Representatives (DPRD), in accordance with Government Regulation Number 108 of 2000. Both the Mayor and Vice Mayor are based at the Ambon City Hall. The administration is also supported by the DPRD, whose members are elected by the people. Administratively, Ambon is divided into 5 districts, which are further subdivided into 50 sub-districts and villages. The largest district is Sirimau, with a population of 178,611, while the smallest is South Leitimur, with 11,862 residents (as of 2016).

=== Mayor ===
The Mayor serves as the highest leader within the Ambon City government. The Mayor of Ambon is titled Upu Latu Lette Kota Nusa Yapono, where Nusa Yapono refers to the traditional name given to the city by the community. Currently, the city is led by Mayor Bodewin Wattimena and Vice Mayor Elly Toisutta, who won the 2024 Ambon Mayoral Election.

No	Mayor	Term Start	Term End	Period	Notes	Vice Mayor
15	Bodewin Wattimena	22 May 2017	Incumbent	17 (2017)	(Note: Richard's second term as Mayor, and Syarif's second term as Vice Mayor)	Elly Toisutta

== Administrative districts ==
The city is divided into five districts (kecamatan), tabulated below with their areas and their 2010 Census and 2020 Census populations, together with the official estimates as at mid 2024. The table also includes the locations of the district administrative centres, the number of administrative villages and subdistricts (kelurahan) in each district (totaling 20 urban kelurahan, 20 negari and 10 rural desa), and its post codes.

Kode Wilayah	Name of District (kecamatan)	Area in km^{2}	Pop'n Census 2010	Pop'n Census 2020	Pop'n Estimate mid 2024	Admin centre	No. of villages	Post code
81.71.01	Nusaniwe	88.35	89,866	90,250	91,574	Amahusu	13 ^{(a)}	97114 - 97118
81.71.02	Sirimau	86.81	140,064	146,426	148,742	Karang Panjang	14 ^{(b)}	97121 - 97129
81.71.03	Teluk Ambon Baguala	40.11	53,472	57,591	61,271	Passo	7 ^{(c)}	97231 - 97233
81.71.04	Teluk Ambon (Ambon Bay)	93.68	38,451	43,363	45,495	Wayame	8 ^{(d)}	97233 - 97237
81.71.05	Leitimur Selatan (South Leitimur)	50.50	9,401	9,658	10,207	Leahari	8 ^{(e)}	97129 & 97237

Notes: (a) comprising 8 kelurahan and 5 negeri. (b) comprising 10 kelurahan, 3 negeri and one desa.
(c) comprising 1 kelurahan, 2 negeri and 4 desa. (d) comprising 1 kelurahan, 2 negeri and 5 desa. (e) all negeri.

Like other regions in the (Maluku Islands), areas in Ambon are still considered to have the status of states, led by kings and queens.

District	States
Nusaniwe	Urimessing, Benteng, Wainitu, Kudamati, Waihaong, Manggadua, Nusanive, Amahusu, Latuhalat, Seilale
Sirimau	Waihoka, Amantelu, Rijali, Karangpanjang, Batumeja, Batugajah, Ahusen, Honipopu, Uritetu, Pandankasturi, Galala, Hative, Batumerah, Soya
Teluk Ambon Baguala	Waiheru, Nania, Negrilama, Passo, Lateri, Latta, Halong
Teluk Ambon (Ambon Bay)	Laha, Tawiri, Greater Hative, Wayame, Rumatiga, Tihu, Poka, Hunuth
South Leitimor	Hatalai, Naku, Kilang, Ema, Hukurila, Hutumuri, Rutong, Leahari

== Religion ==
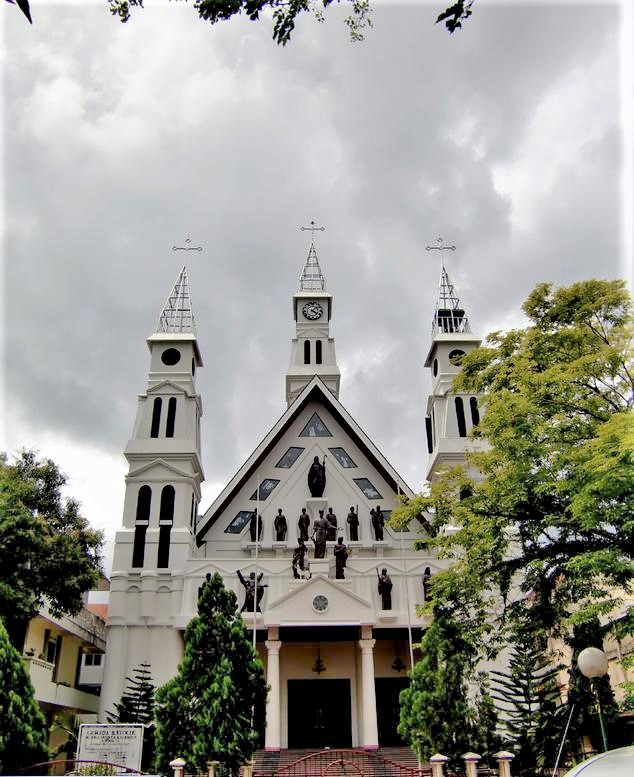
The Cathedral of Ambon

According to the Regional Office of the Ministry of Religious Affairs for Maluku Province, as of 2022, the largest religious group in Ambon City is Christian at 59.51%, followed by Islam at 40.47%, Hinduism at 0.08%, Buddhism at 0.34%, and Confucianism and others at less than 0.01%. Ambon is a Protestant-majority city.

In 2021, there were 333 churches in the city. The largest Protestant church building is GPM Maranatha, while the largest Catholic church is the Saint Francis Xavier Cathedral. Additionally, GPM Silo serves as one of the city's primary Protestant churches. The majority of the city's Protestant community are members of the Protestant Church of Maluku (GPM). Ambon also has its own Roman Catholic diocese, the Diocese of Amboina. The districts with a Christian majority are Nusaniwe, Baguala, and South Leitimur, where Protestantism is the dominant religion.

The city also has a large Muslim population, accounting for 40.47% of residents based on 2022 data. In 2021, there were 168 mosques; one of the largest is the Al-Fatah Grand Mosque, while the oldest is the Ambon Jami Mosque, built in 1860. Ambon City is also the largest contributor of Hajj pilgrims in Maluku, with 245 pilgrims in 2014. The districts where Islam is the dominant religion are Sirimau and Ambon Bay.

Ambon City also has other minority religious populations in very small numbers, namely Hinduism, Buddhism, and Confucianism. Although their numbers are small, these three religions receive government attention. In 2018, President Joko Widodo inaugurated the Hindu Center and Buddha Center in Ambon City. This was done to fulfill the Maluku Governor's wish for Maluku to become a laboratory for religious harmony in Indonesia. A well-known temple (pura) in the city is Pura Stana Giri Ciwa, while the famous Buddhist temple (wihara) is Wihara Swarna Giri Tirta. The city also has a very small number of Confucian followers, recorded as 7 individuals in the 2010 Indonesian Population Census.

== Economy ==
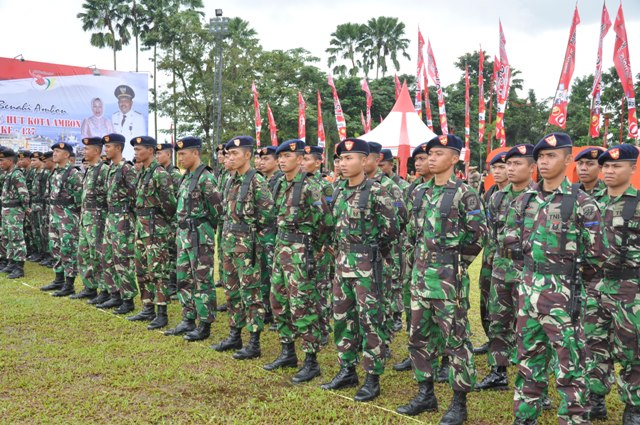
A major part of Ambon City's economy is derived from government administration, defense, and compulsory social security.

Economic growth rate of Ambon City in 2014 was 5.96%. Gross Domestic Regional Product in 2014 both at current market price and at constant market price was increasing gradually. The increase, if compared to 2013 GDRP at current market price equal to 12.76 percent and 5.96 percent for GDRP at constant market price. The GDRP at current market price in Ambon 2014 was equal to Rp.9.9 trillion, whereas for GDRP at constant 2010 market price, it was equal to Rp.7.77 trillion.

In 2014, the gross domestic product per capita of Ambon based on current prices grew by 8.3 percent, while for the constant price in Ambon City grew by 1.7 percent. GDP per capita of Ambon City in 2014 is 25.16 Million (U $1,836.43). The poverty rate in the city of Ambon is 4.42% which is the smallest percentage of poverty in the province of Maluku.

All twenty one economic sectors in 2014 saw positive growth for GDRP of Ambon. For GDRP at current market price, the highest contribution was provided by the electricity and gas Sector with 34.2 percent, while the lowest was human health and Social Work activities with 6.61 percent.

== Education ==
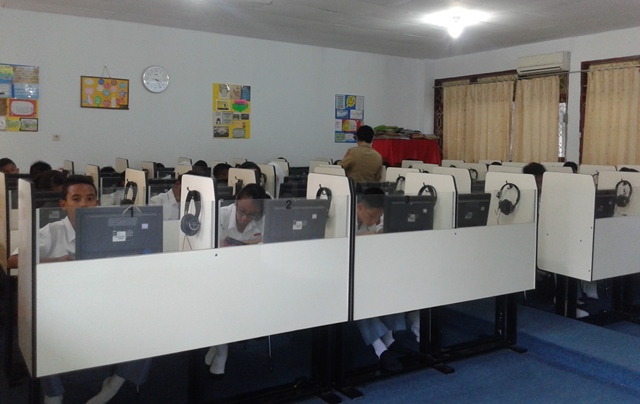
Student learning at SMAN 1 Ambon, one of the public high schools in the city of Ambon.

Education in Ambon City was recorded to have begun with the establishment of MULO in 1947, a Secondary School in 1946, and the Algemeene Middelbare School in 1946. In 1951, these schools were replaced by 104 junior high schools (44 public, 47 private, 8 aided, and 5 subsidized), senior high schools, and vocational high schools.The average length of schooling for Ambon's residents is 11.64 years, equaling Singapore and France, with a school expectancy of 15.9 years, which approached Switzerland's figures in 2016. Thus, in these two aspects, the city has matched other developed nations.

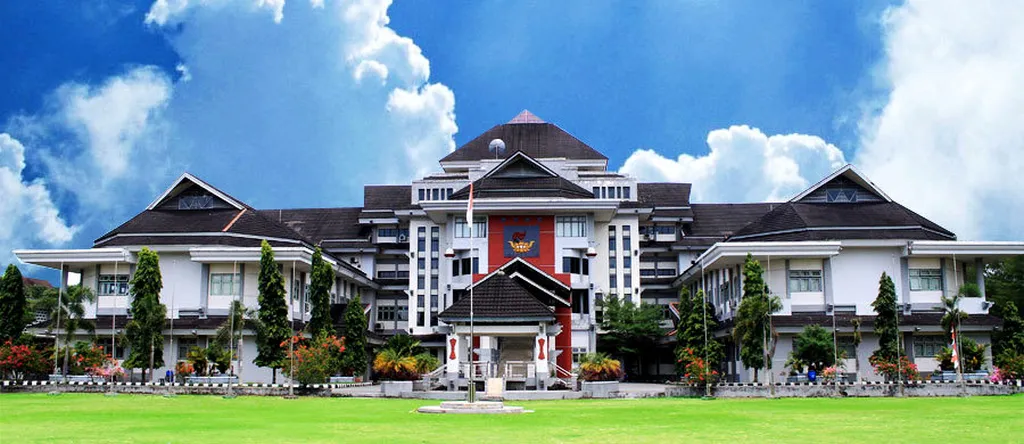
University of Pattimura

Ambon is home to several prominent higher education institutions located in the city, such as Pattimura University (Unpatti) and Ambon State Polytechnic, both situated in Ambon Bay. Although the city's higher education institutions are not among the best in Indonesia, the two best universities mentioned are still categorized in Cluster 3, with Ambon State Polytechnic ranked 186th and Pattimura University ranked 282nd according to Kemenristekdikti.

Efforts to improve education have also been carried out through various programs, including scholarships. The city government has provided study scholarships to Japan for students—distributed across Maebashi, Fukuoka, and other cities in collaboration with the Kyoto government—and to India for civil servants. However, there was a case of a master's degree scholarship scam that victimized a Unpatti student, though it did not originate from the government.

== Places of interest ==
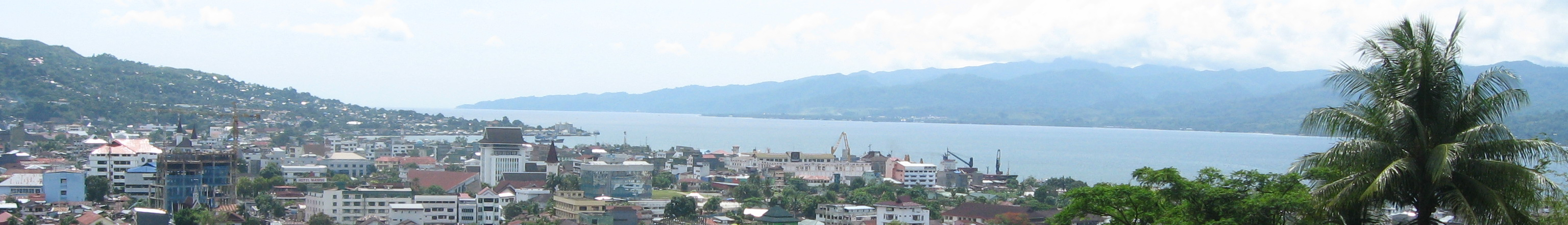
Panoramic view of ambon

=== Natural tourism ===
Ambon has many natural tourist attractions, though administratively, most of the highly famous sites are located in the Central Maluku Regency but are accessed through Ambon City. Among the beaches on Ambon Island, the most famous is Natsepa Beach, located in Suli Village, Central Maluku, which is well-known for its rujak natsepa. Additionally, there is Liang Beach, situated in Liang, Sala Hutu, Central Maluku.

For diving activities, there is Nusa Pombo, an island located between Ambon Island and Haruku Island. On the other hand, famous tourist spots within the city's administrative area are fewer and not as renowned as those in the regency, yet they are no less beautiful. Among the most famous is Pintu Kota Beach. Pintu Kota Beach is famous for its uniqueness, featuring a large hole that pierces through a coral cliff, passing through both sides. There is also Namasua Beach located in Naku, which remains relatively unknown. Besides beaches, there is Anihang Waterfall in Naku, which was once mentioned by Mayor Richard.

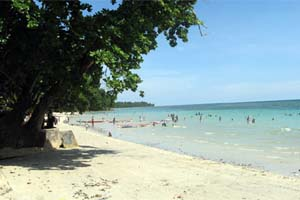
Pantai Natsepa

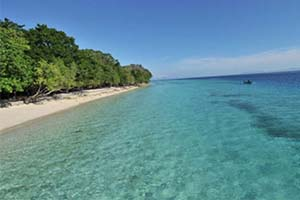
Pantai Liang

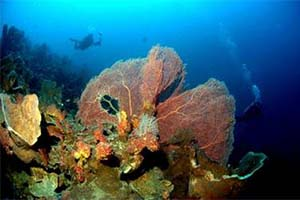
Bawah laut Nusa Pombo

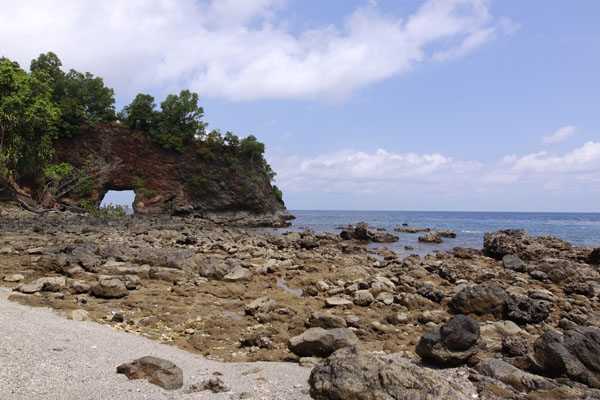
Pantai Pintu Kota

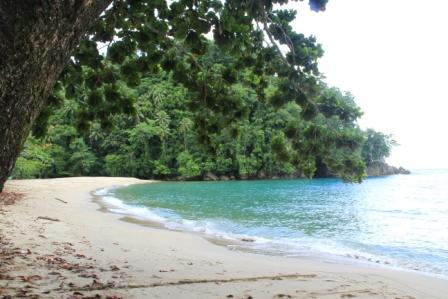
Pantai Namasua

=== Historical tourism ===
In Ambon City, there is a museum called Museum Siwalima. Inside the Museum Siwalima, there are collections of historical objects.

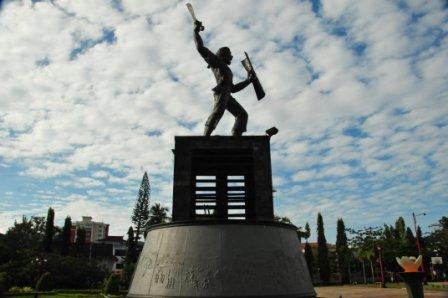
Pattimura Statue

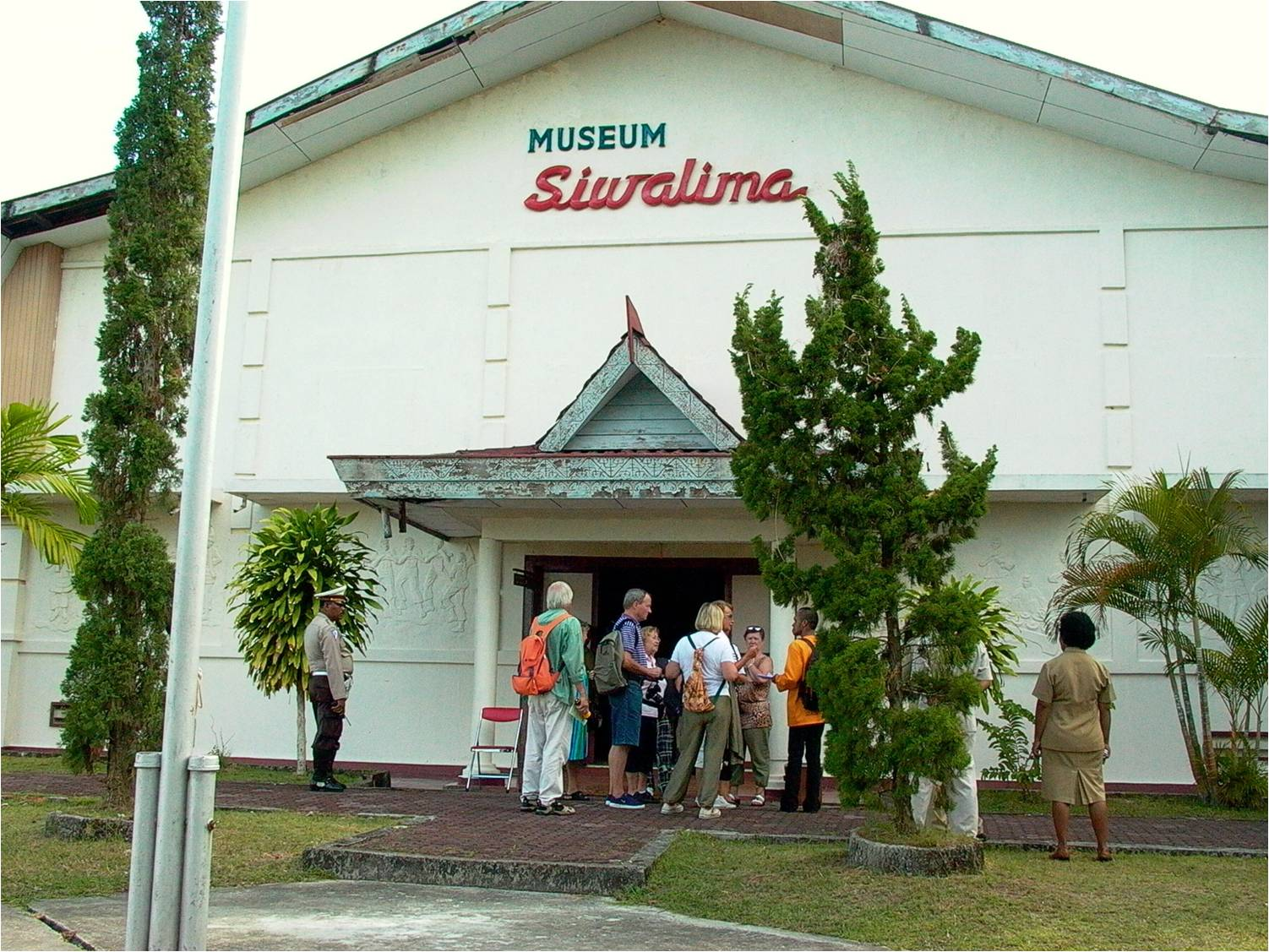
Siwalima Museum

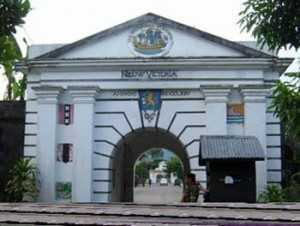
Fort Victoria (Ambon)

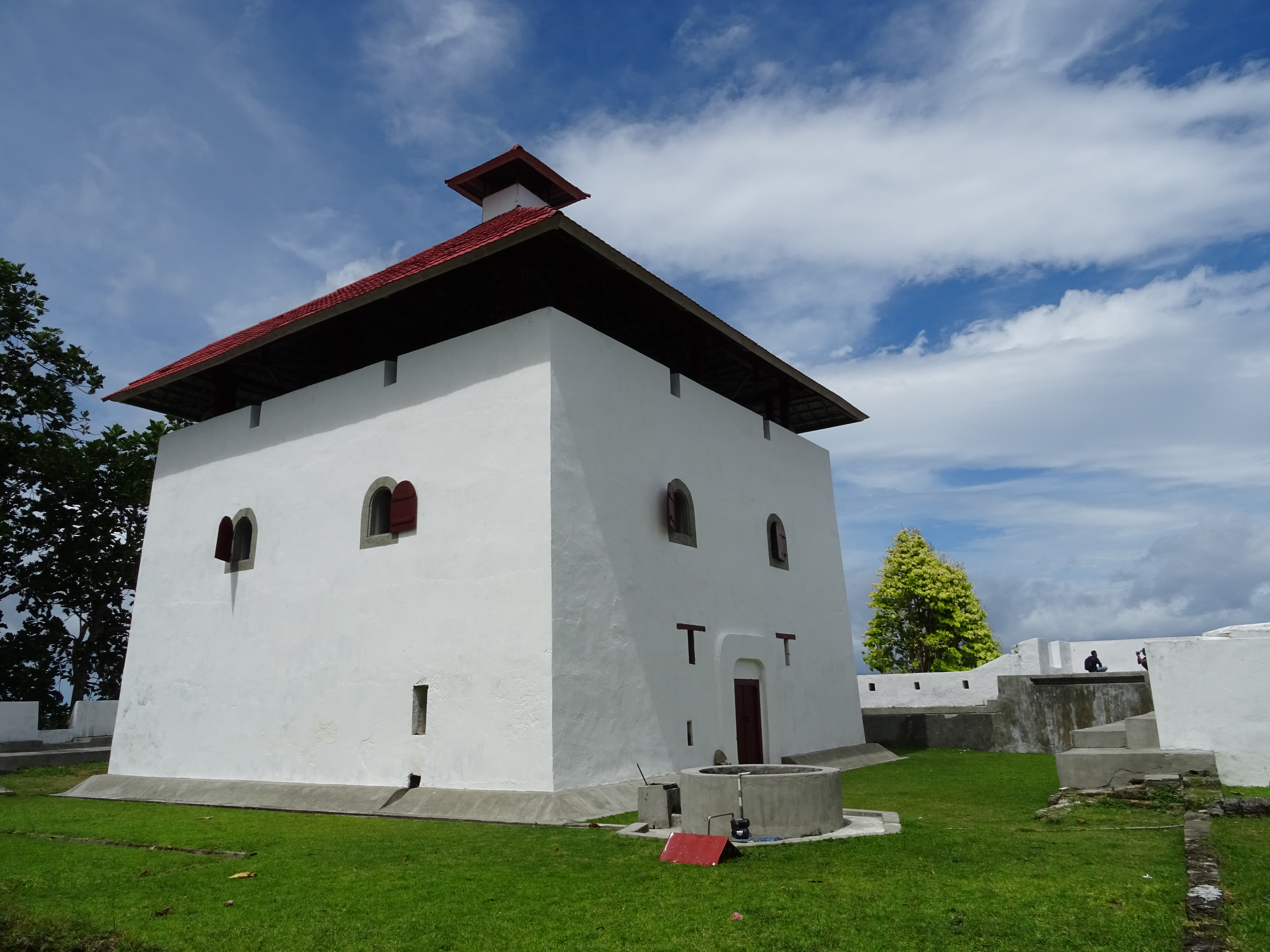
Fort Amsterdam, Ambon

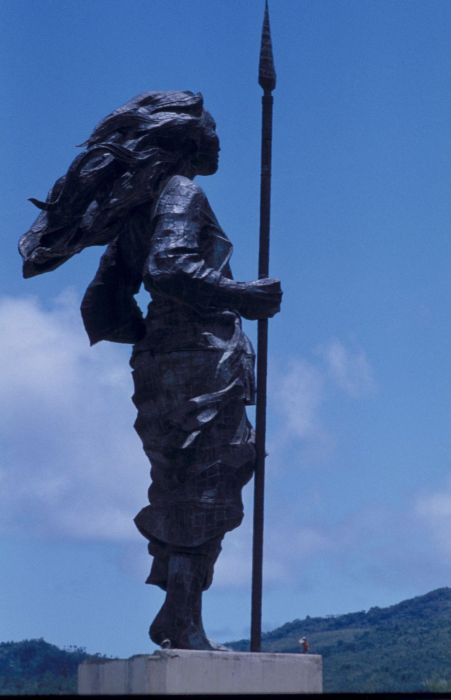
Martha Christina Tiahahu Statue

== Transportation ==
Ambon is served by Pattimura International Airport.

== Twin towns – sister cities ==
Ambon is twinned with:

- Darwin, Australia
- Vlissingen, Netherlands

== Gallery ==
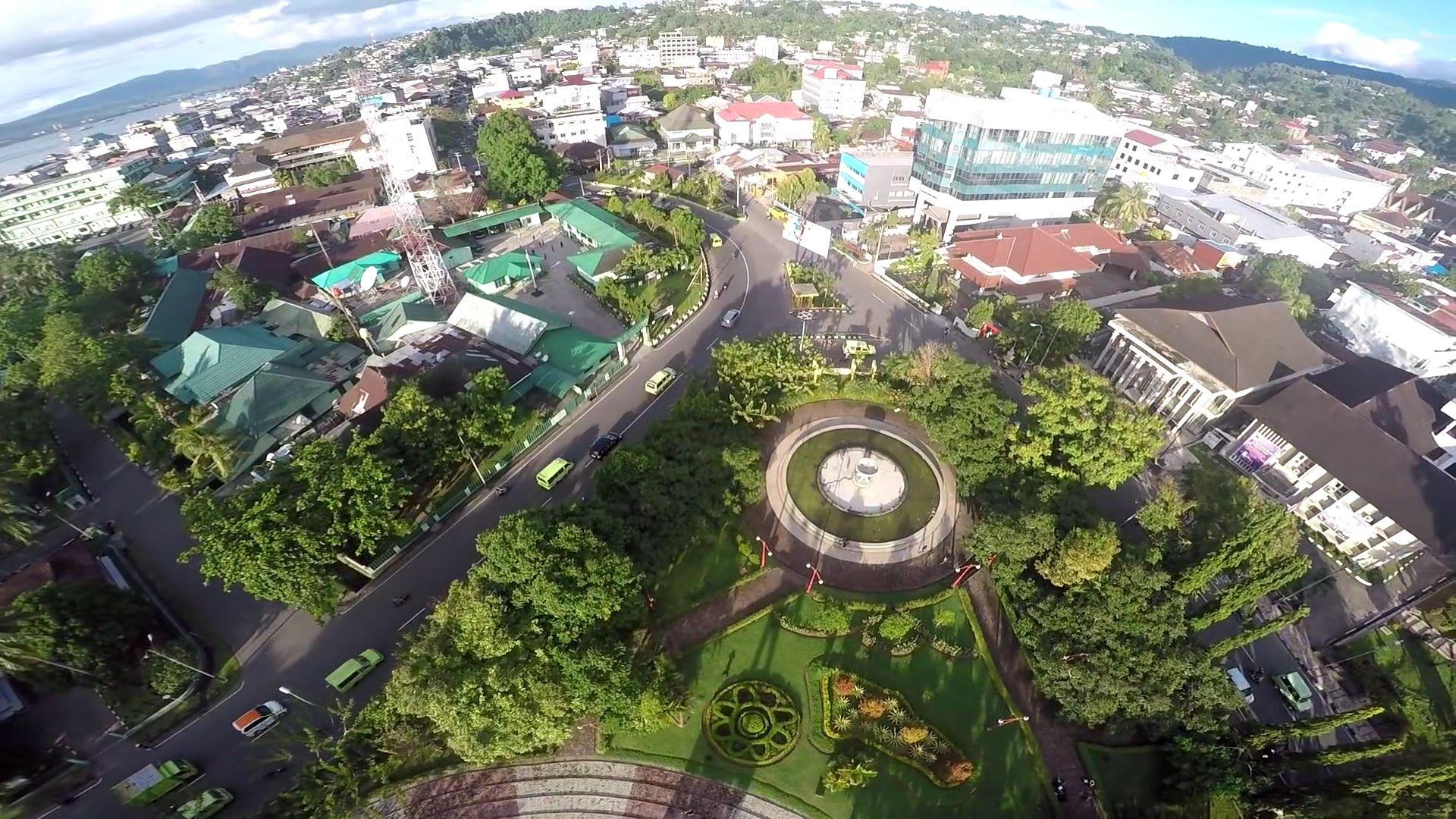

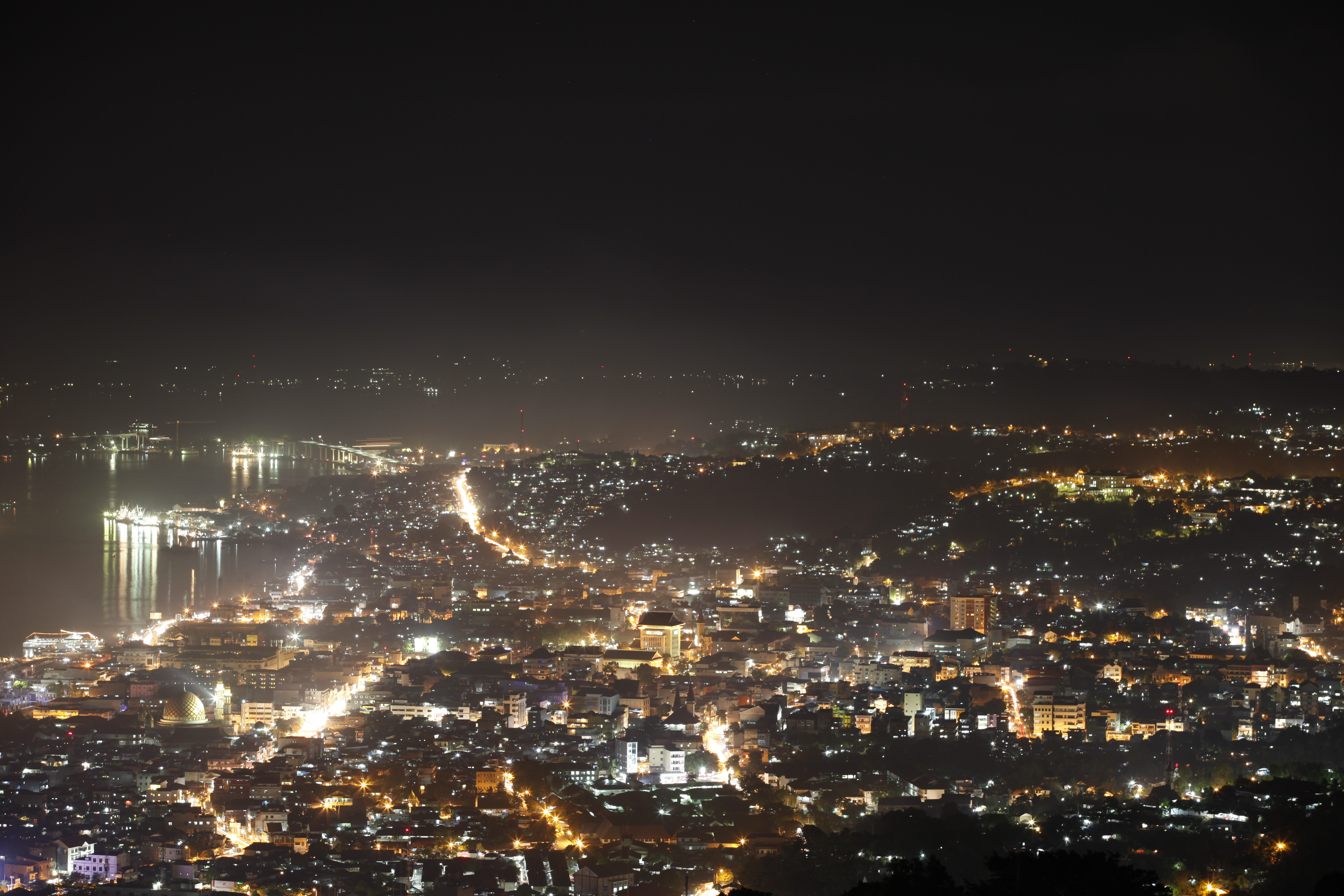

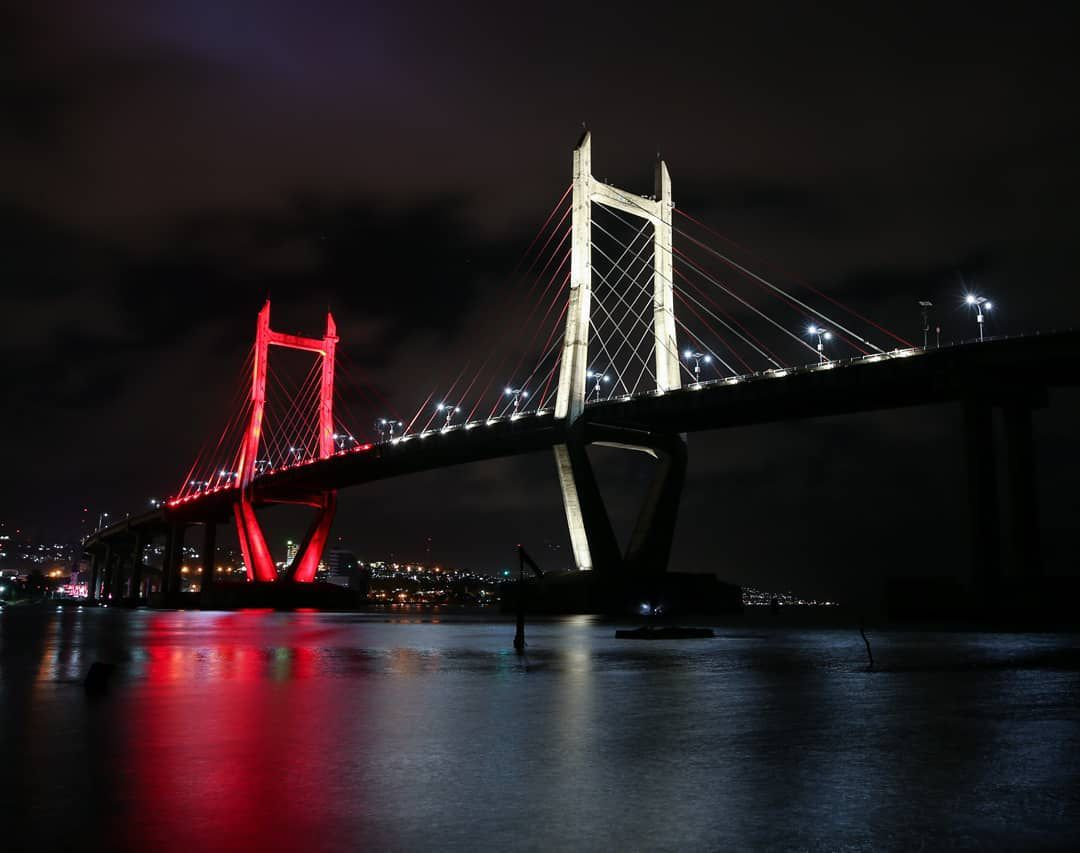

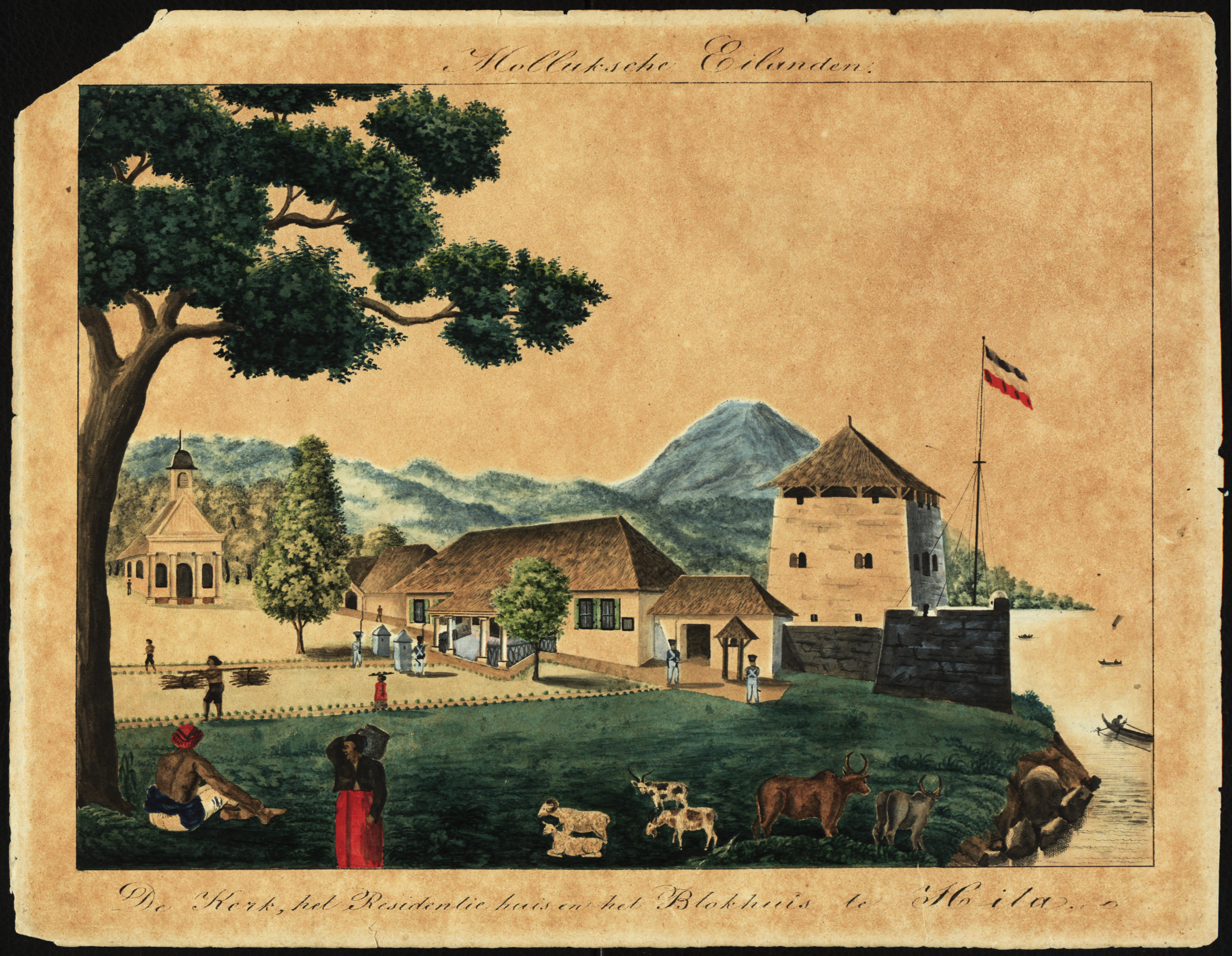

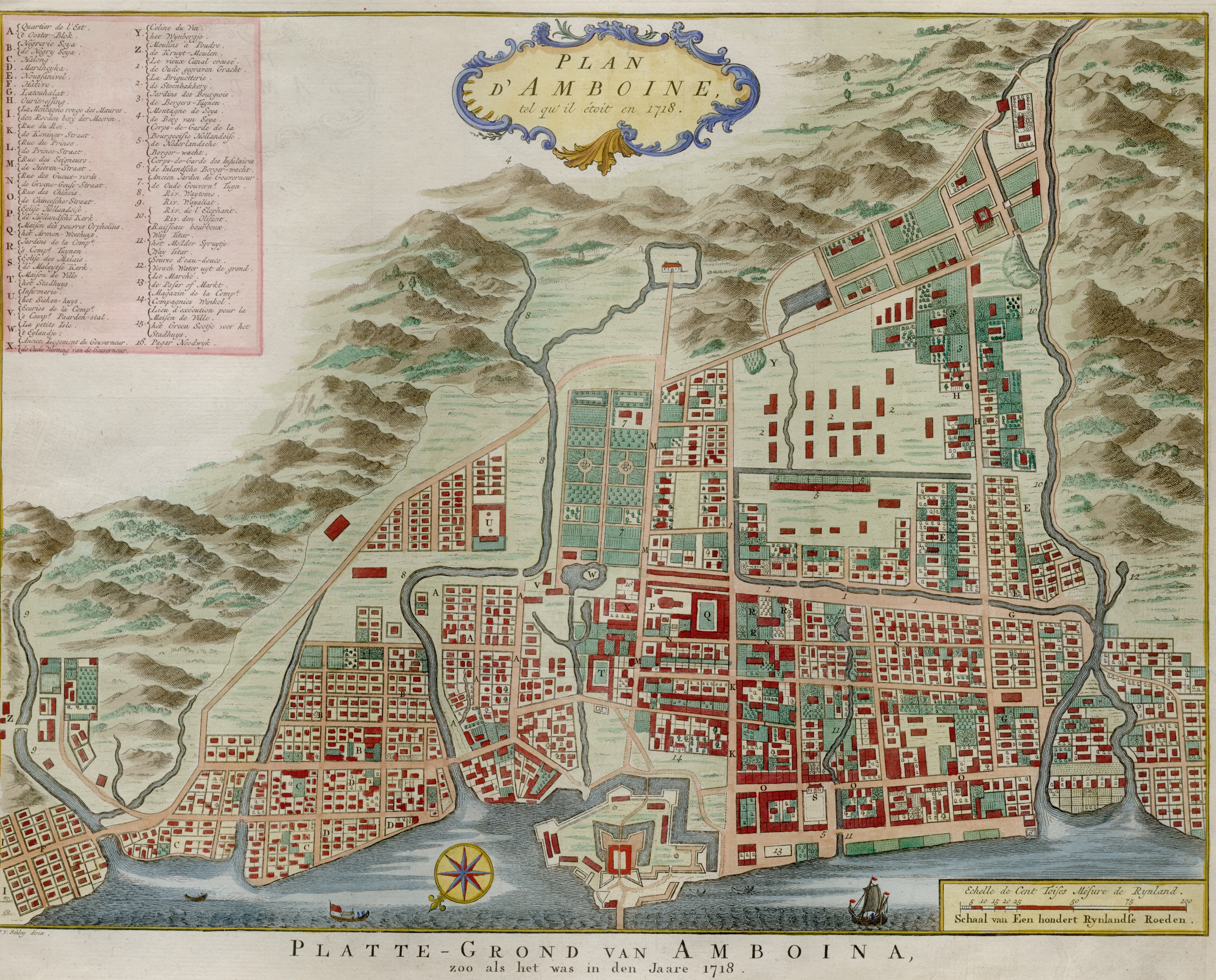

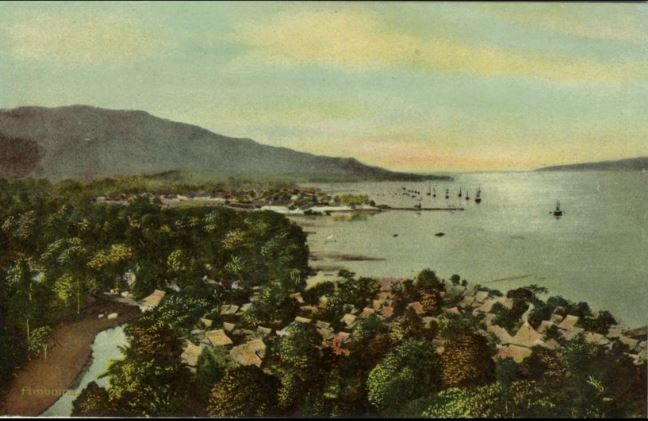

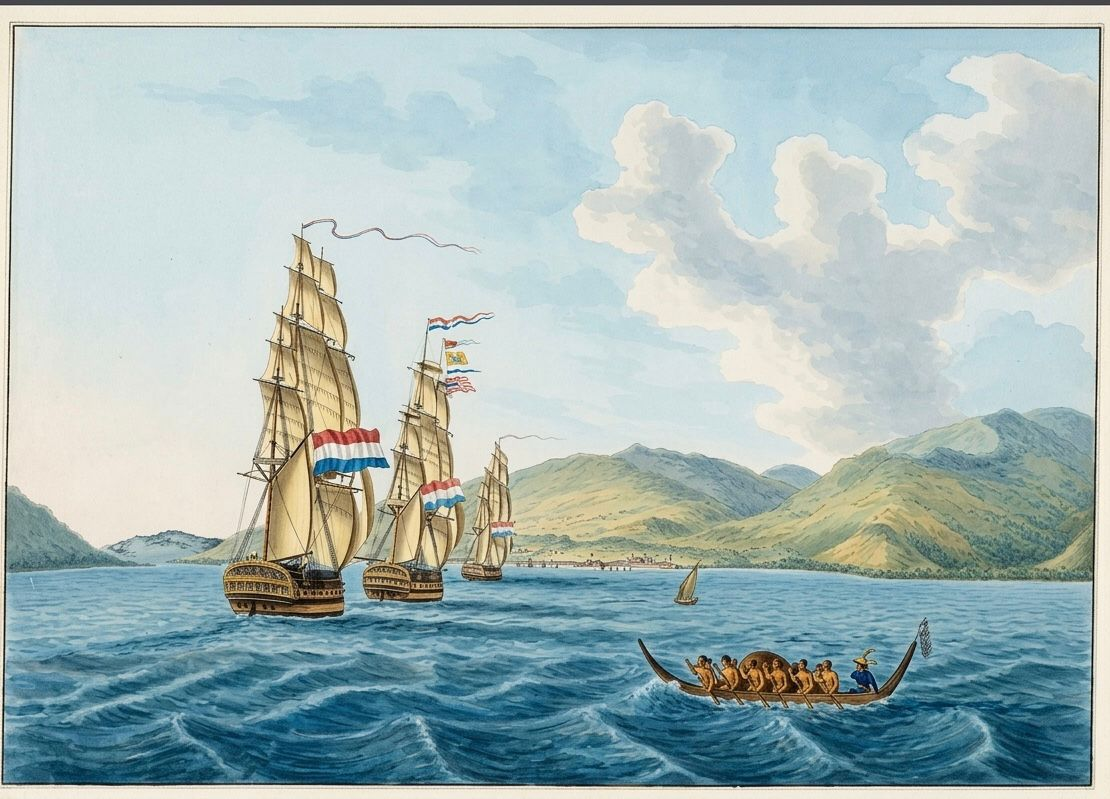

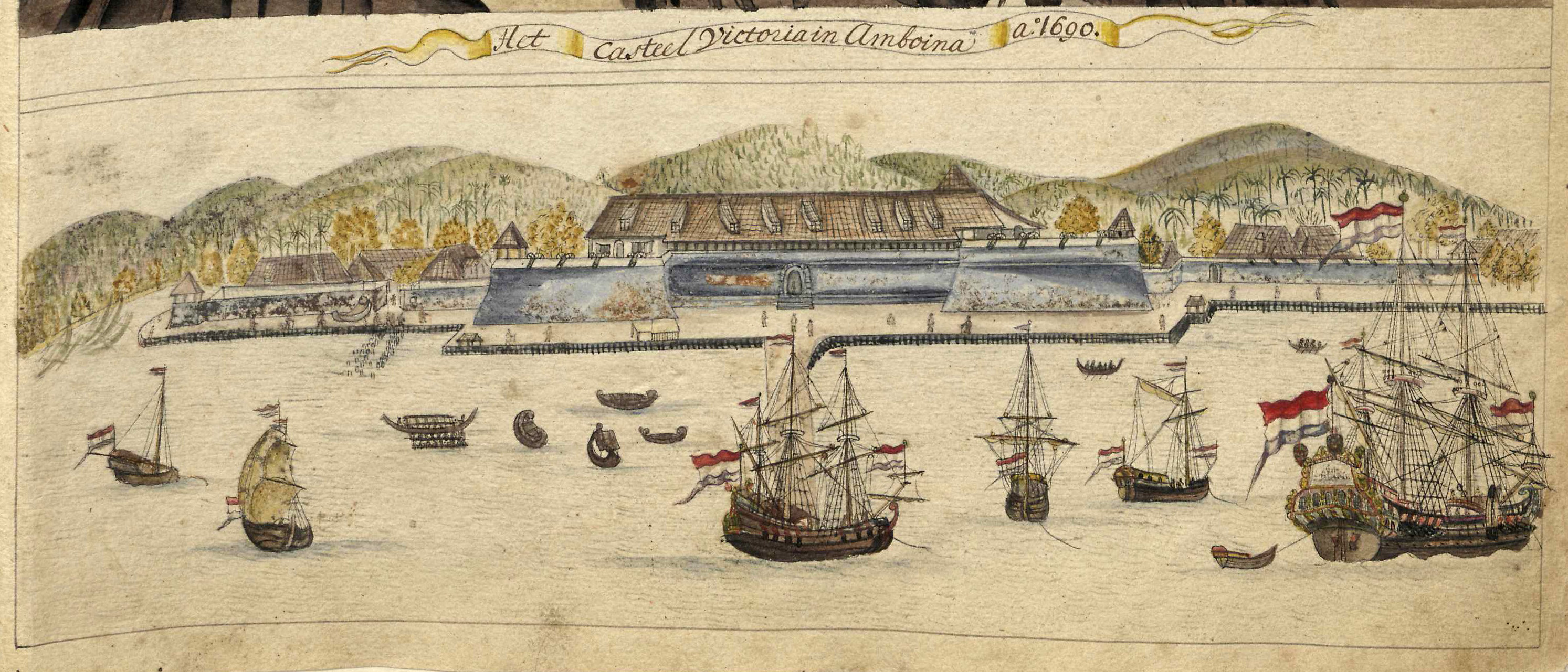

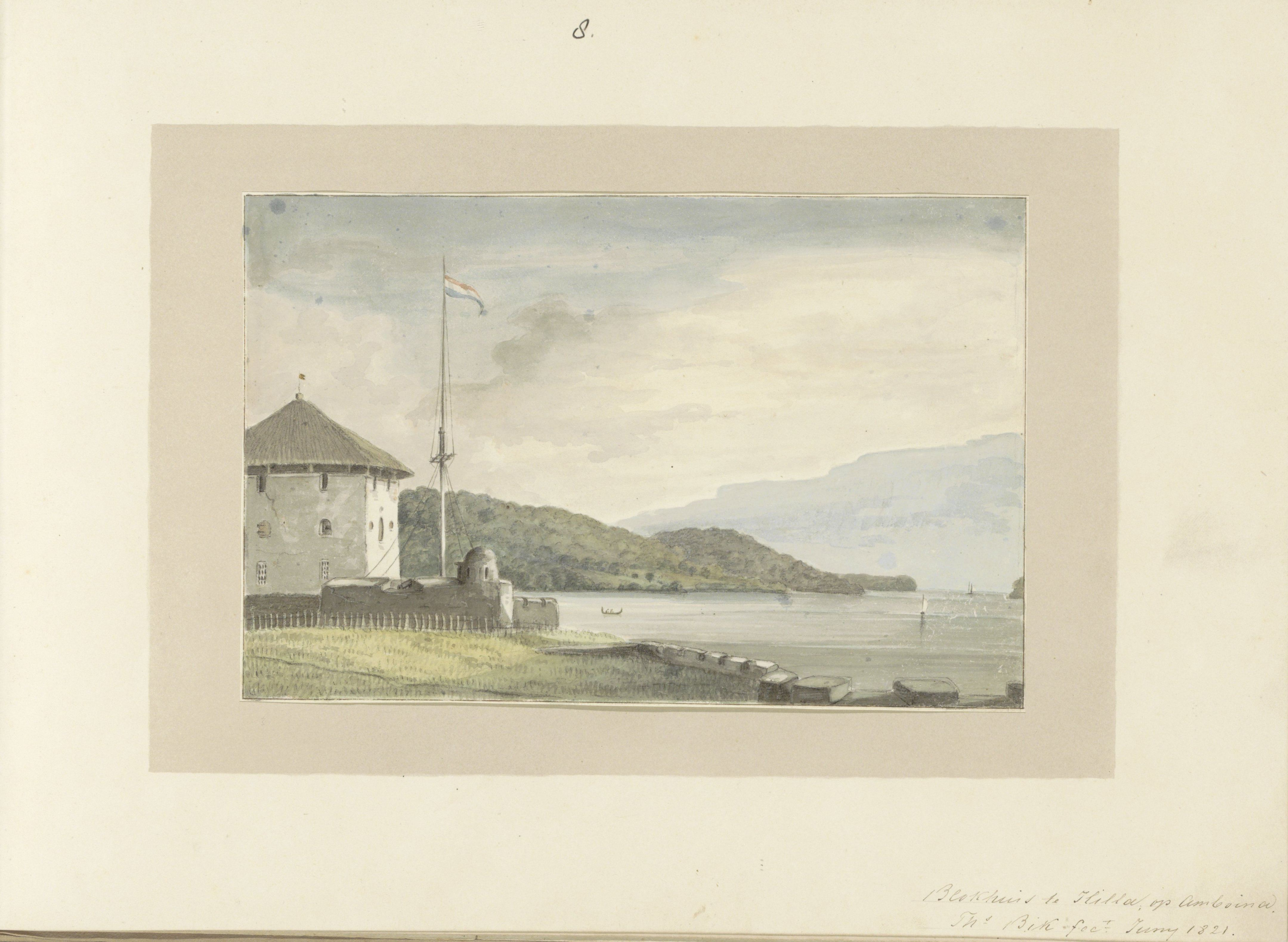

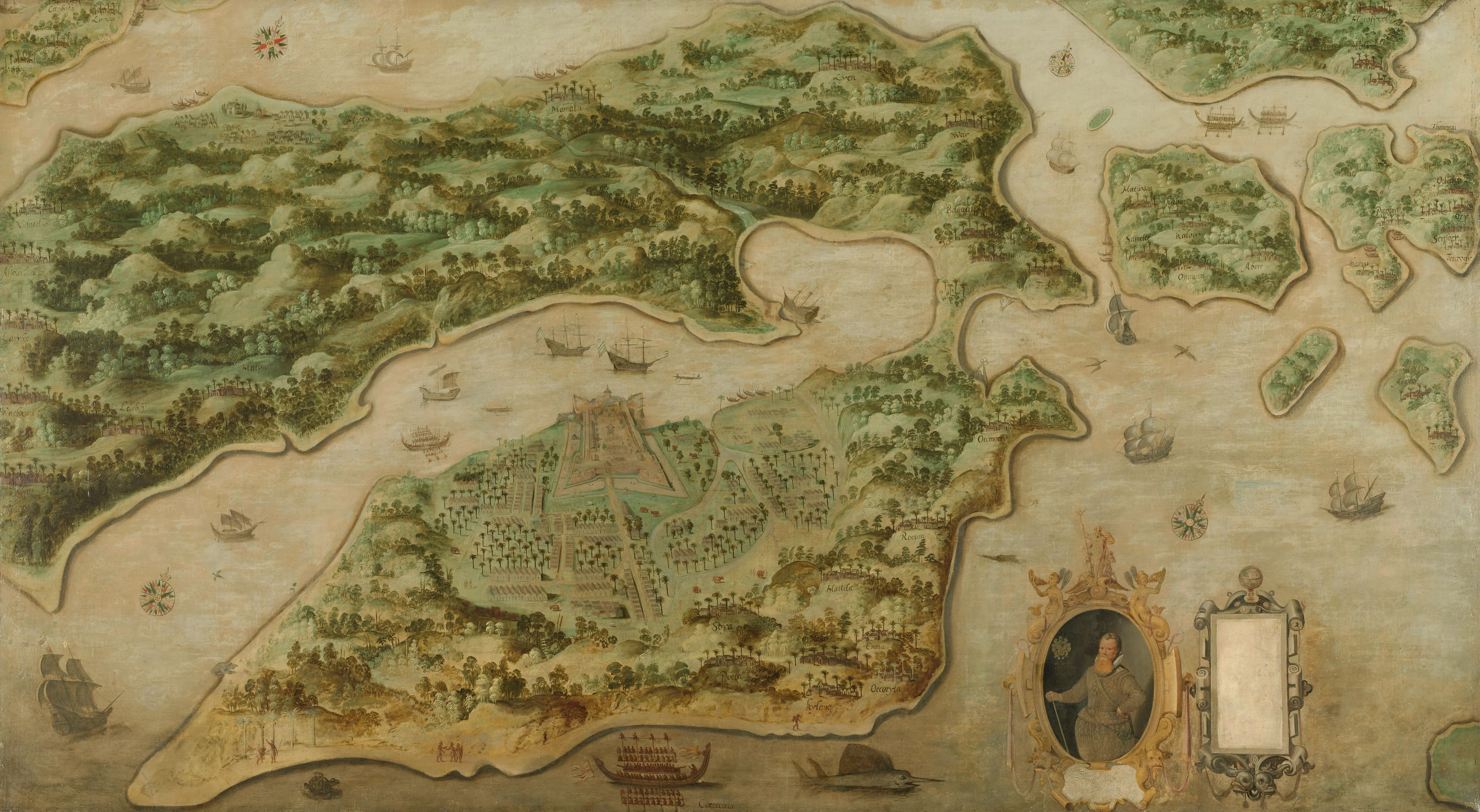

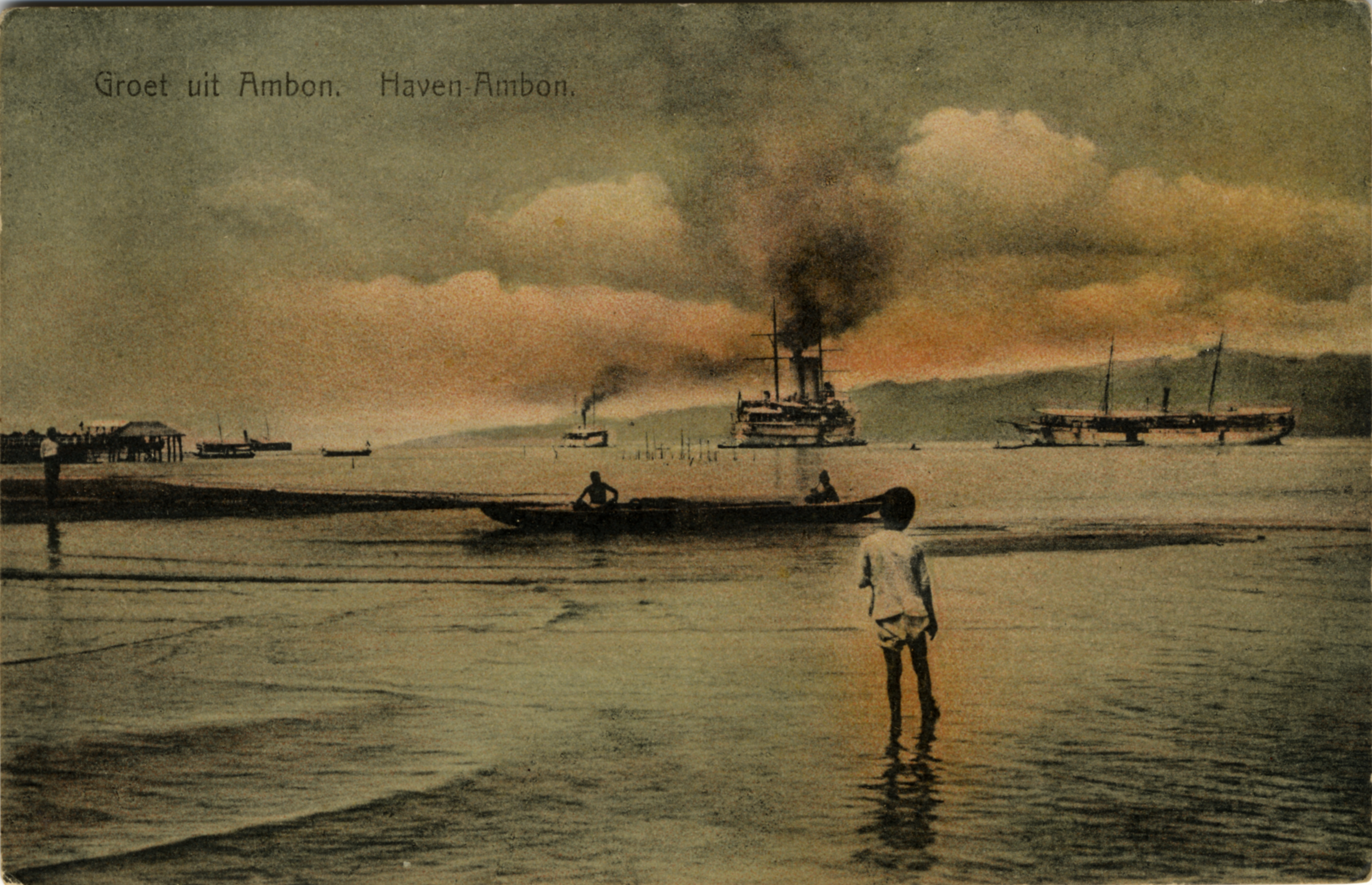

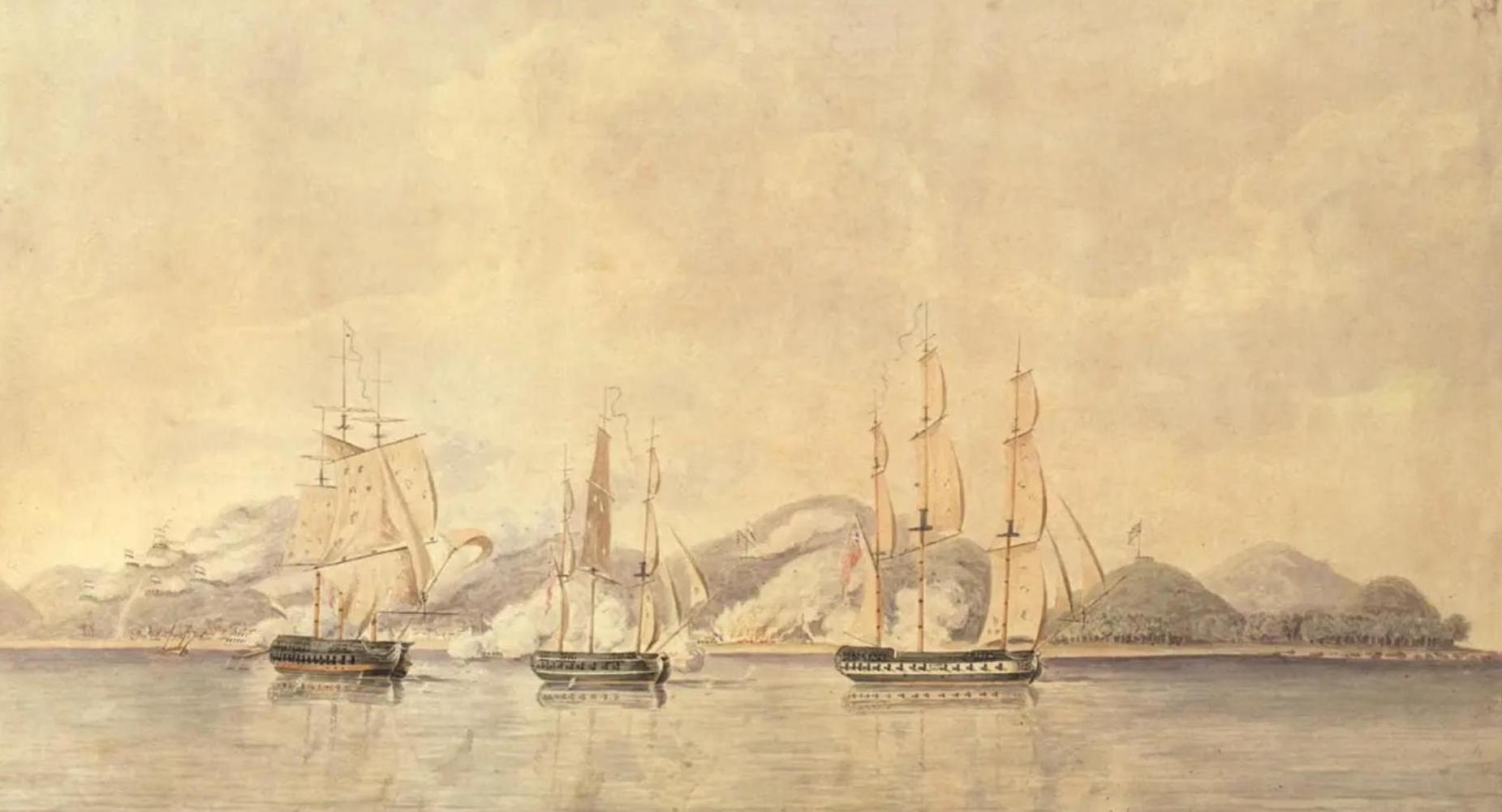

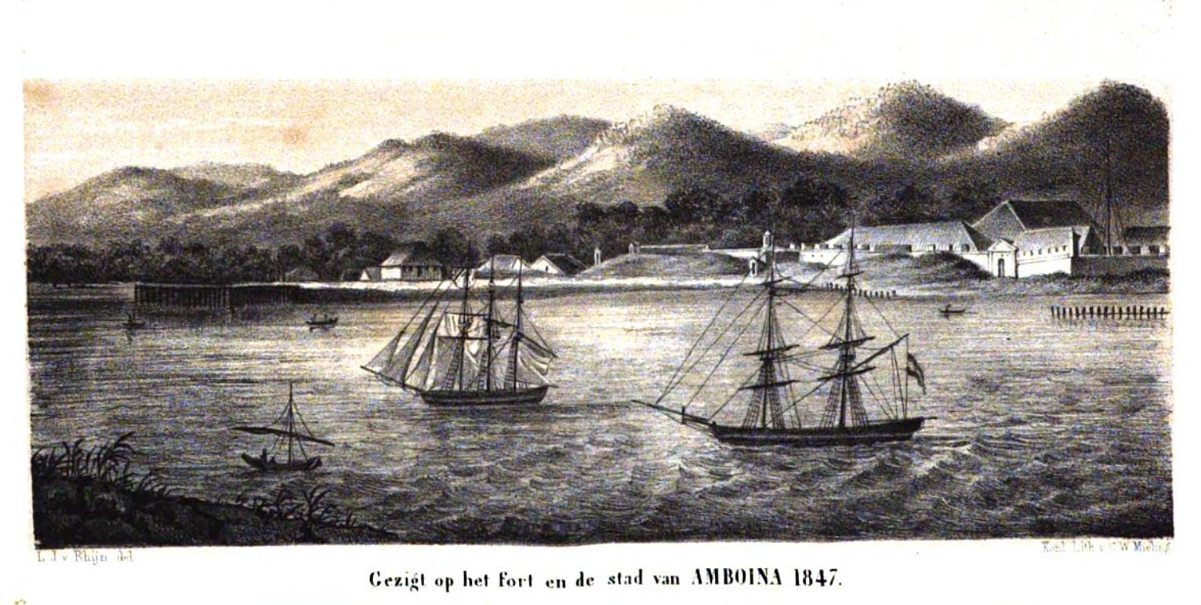

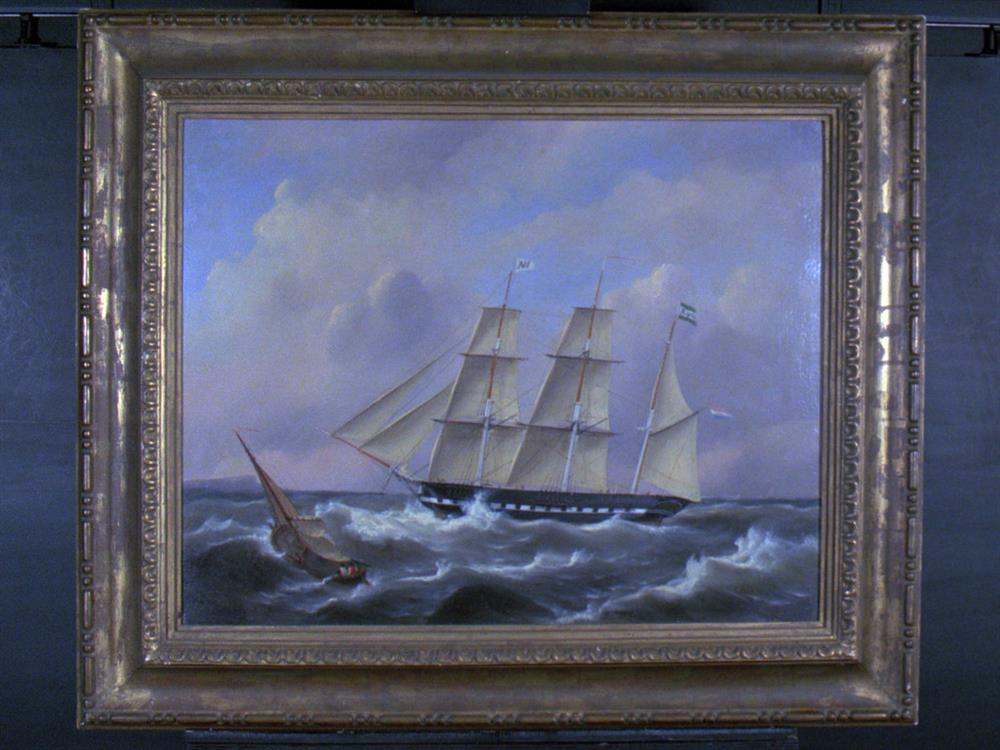

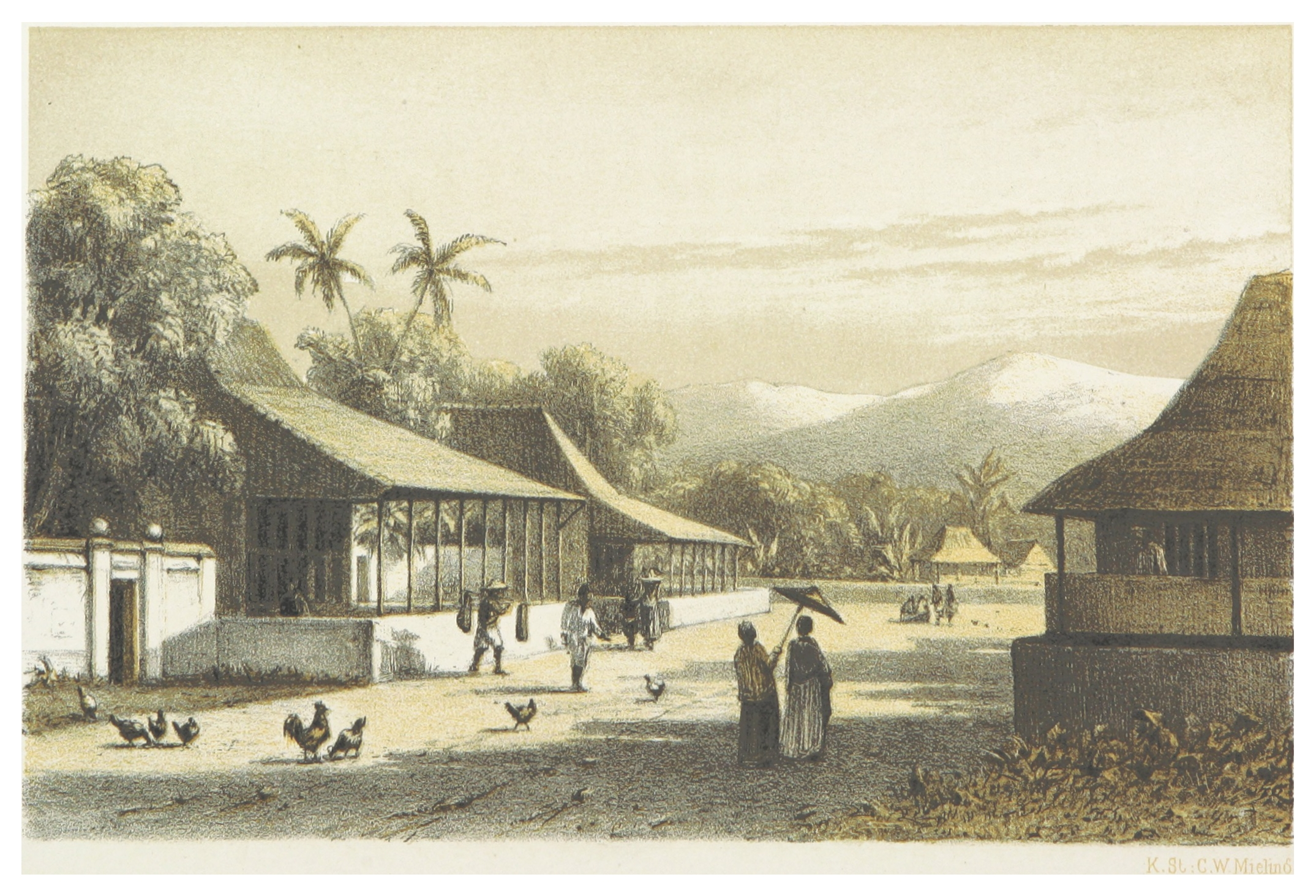

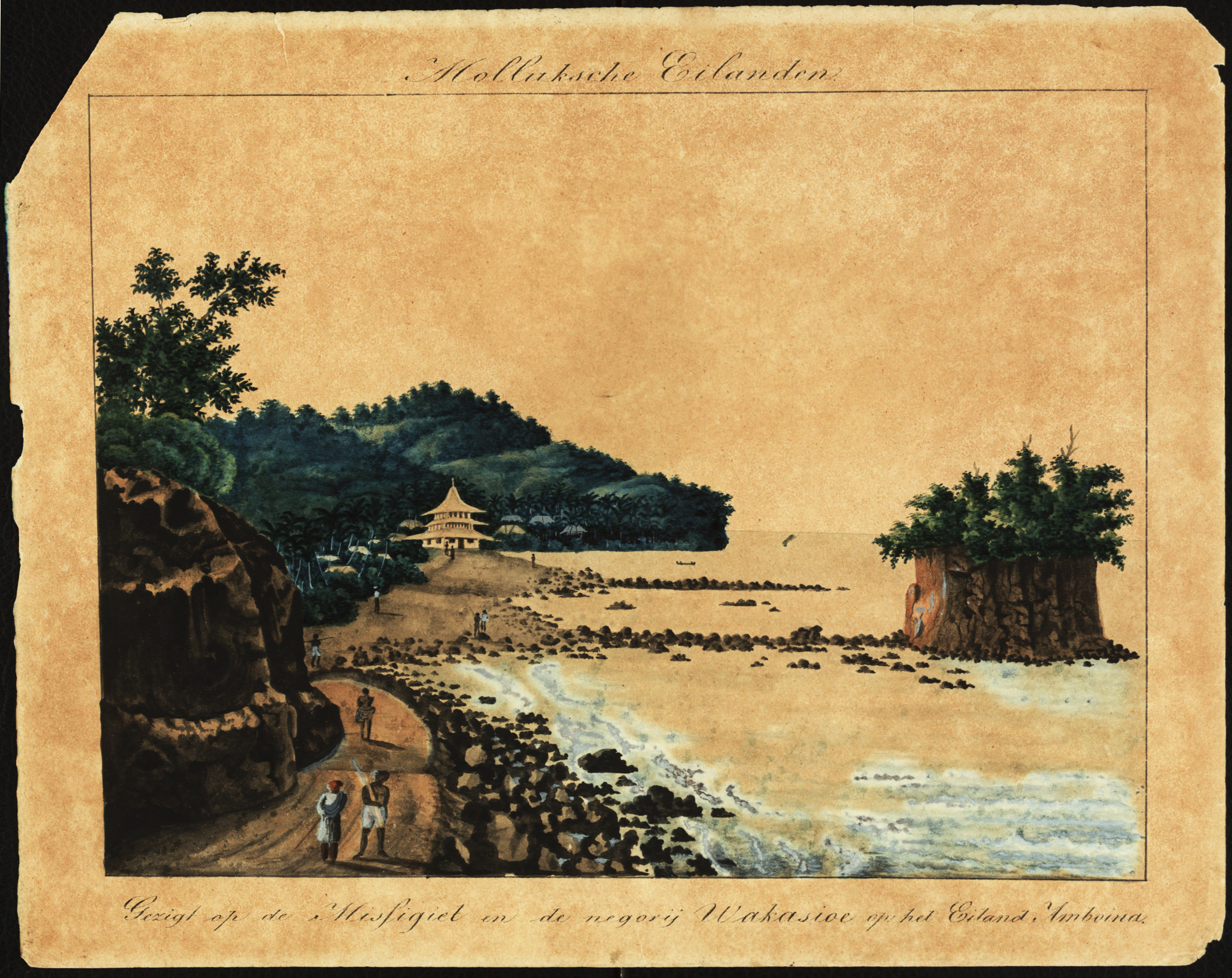

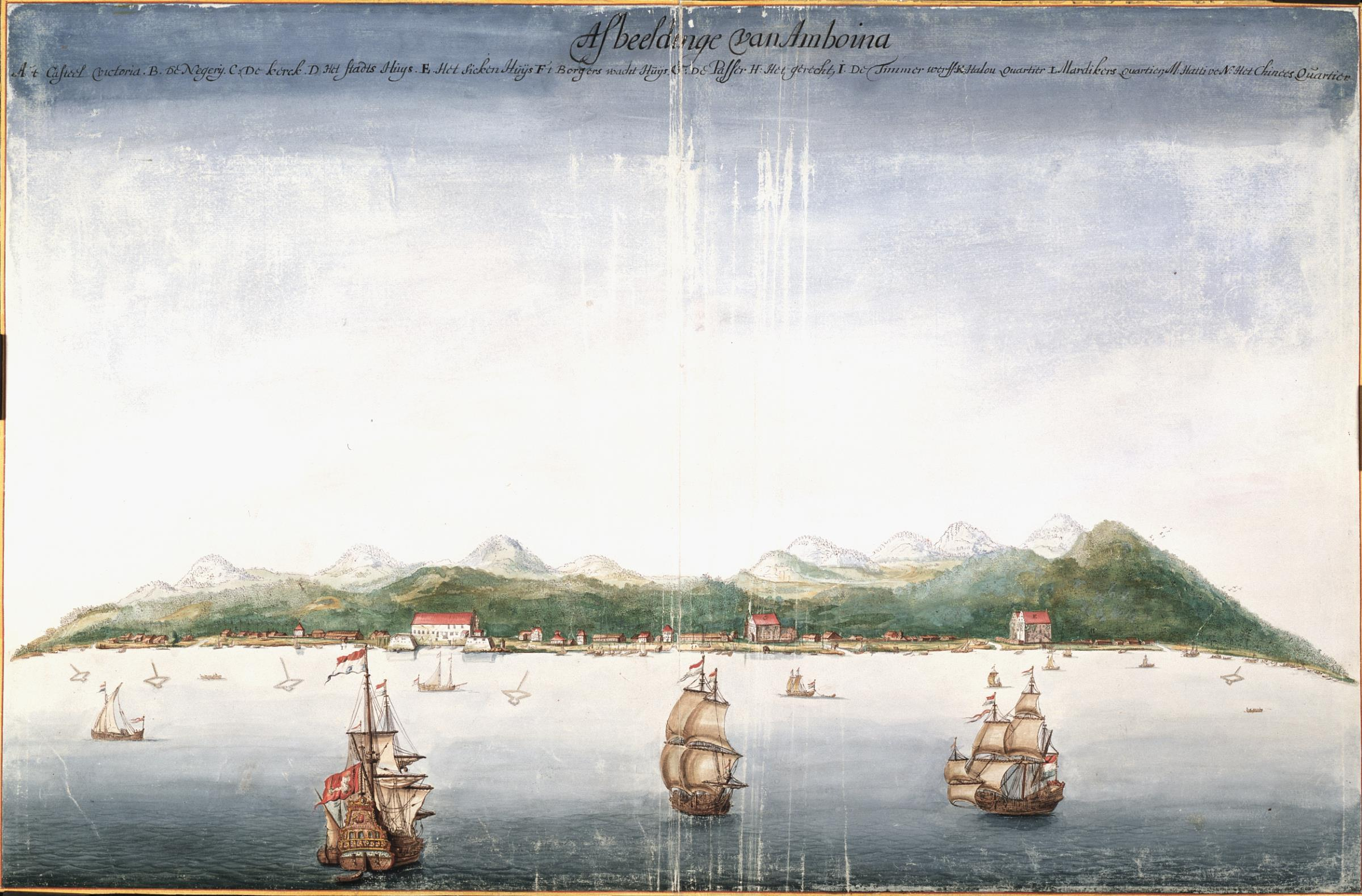

== Sources ==
- Conboy, Kenneth; Morrison, James (1999). Feet to the Fire CIA Covert Operations in Indonesia, 1957–1958. Annapolis: Naval Institute Press. ISBN 1-55750-193-9.
- Kahin, Audrey R; Kahin, George McT (1997) [1995]. Subversion as Foreign Policy The Secret Eisenhower and Dulles Debacle in Indonesia. Seattle and London: University of Washington Press. ISBN 0-295-97618-7.
- Klemen, L (2000). "The Carnage at Laha, February 1942". Forgotten Campaign: The Dutch East Indies Campaign 1941–1942. Archived from the original on 17 February 2022.
- Koninklijke Nederlands Indonesisch Leger (1948). "Verdediging Van Het Eiland Ambon in Het Jaar 1942" (PDF). Militaire Spectator. 284.
- Wigmore, Lionel (1957). The Japanese Thrust. Australia in the War of 1939–1945. Series 1 – Army. Vol. 4. Canberra: Australian War Memorial. OCLC 3134219.
